= Sinicization of Tibet =

Forced assimilation by China

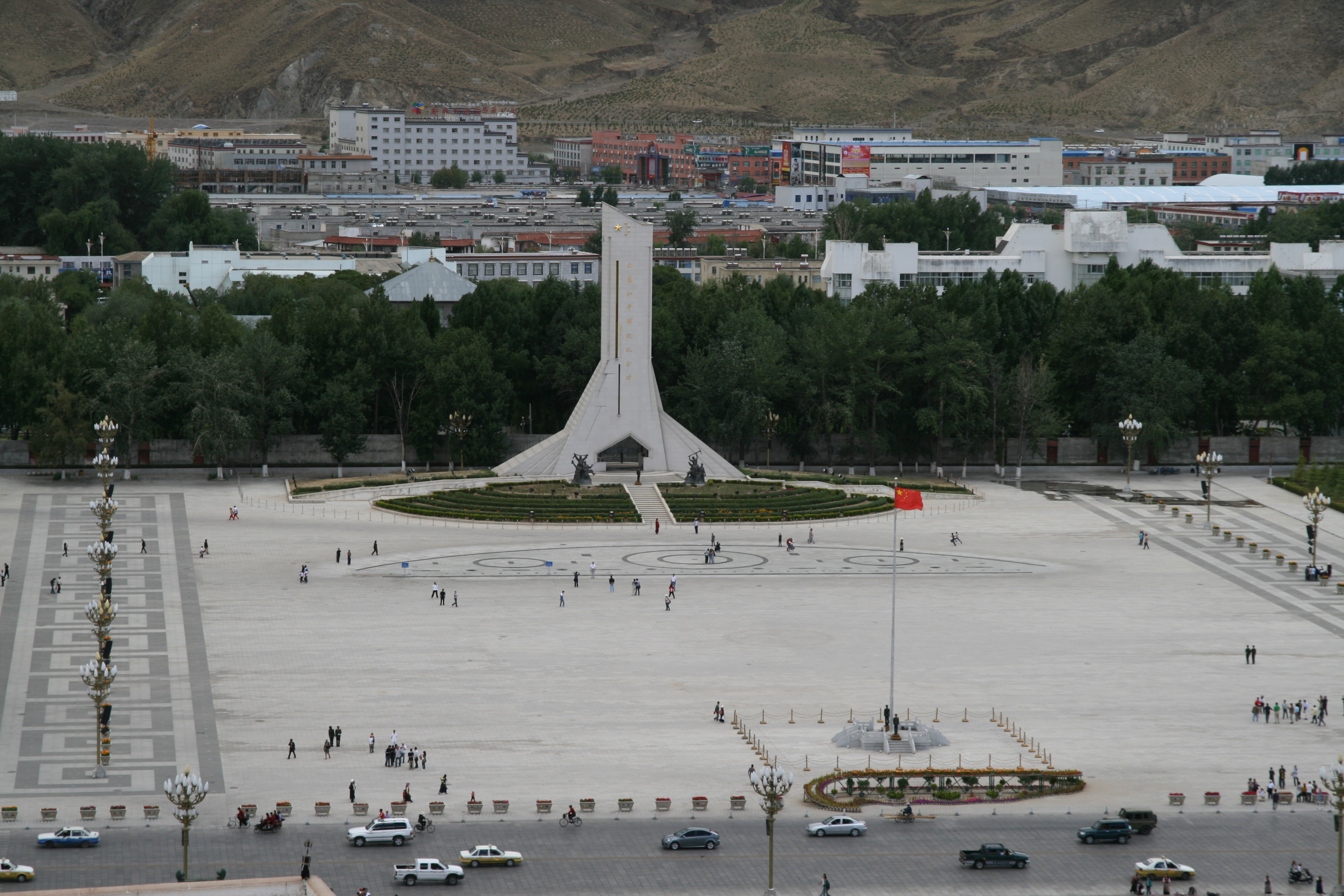
Monument to the Peaceful Liberation of Tibet, Potala Square, Lhasa in 2009 celebrating the People's Liberation Army entering Tibet, built just outside the protective zone and buffer zone of the World Heritage Site.

The sinicization of Tibet includes the programs and laws of the Chinese government to force cultural assimilation in Tibetan areas of China, including the Tibet Autonomous Region and the surrounding Tibetan-designated autonomous areas. The efforts are undertaken by China in order to remake Tibetan culture into mainstream Chinese culture.

The changes, which have been evident since the annexation of Tibet by the People's Republic of China in 1950–51, have been facilitated by a range of economic, social, cultural, religious and political changes that have been implemented in Tibet by the Chinese government. Critics cite the government-sponsored migration of large numbers of Han Chinese into the Tibet Autonomous Region, deemed Chinese settlements, as a major component of sinicization. Some academics have described it as a form of Han settler colonialism.

According to the Central Tibetan Administration (CTA), the government of Tibet in exile, China's policy has allegedly resulted in the disappearance of elements of Tibetan culture; this policy has been called a "cultural genocide". The government in exile says that the policies intend to make Tibet an integral part of China and control desire for Tibetan self-determination. The 14th Dalai Lama and the Central Tibet Administration have characterized sinicization programs as genocide or cultural cleansing in the context of Tibet.

The Chinese government claims that its policies have benefited Tibet, and it also claims that the cultural and social changes which have occurred in Tibet are consequences of modernization. According to the Chinese government, Tibet's economy has expanded; improved services and infrastructure have improved the quality of life of Tibetans, and the Tibetan language and culture have been protected.

== History ==
=== Qing dynasty and the Republic of China ===
Tibet has a complicated relationship with its neighbors, including China, especially during the Qing dynasty. After the Qing was overthrown in 1912 and before 1950, the area that corresponds to the modern-day Tibet Autonomous Region (TAR) was claimed by the Republic of China but operated as a de facto independent state unrecognized by other countries. It printed its own currency and postage and engaged in some forms of international relations but did not exchange ambassadors with other nations. The government in Lhasa controlled central Tibet (Ü-Tsang) and later western Kham. Amdo and other parts of Kham were either autonomous, allied with or ruled by the Chinese, or repeatedly changed hands. During the early 20th century, Chinese Muslim general Ma Bufang governed Qinghai and implemented policies of sinicization and Islamification in Tibetan areas, according to accusations made by Tibetans. Forced conversion and heavy taxes were reported under his rule.

=== People's Republic of China ===
After CCP Chairman Mao Zedong won the Chinese Civil War in 1949, his goal was the unification of the "five nationalities" as the People's Republic of China (PRC) under the rule of the Chinese Communist Party. The Tibetan government in Lhasa sent Ngabo (known as Ngabo in English sources) to Chamdo in Kham, a strategic town near the border, with orders to hold his position while reinforcements came from Lhasa to fight against the Chinese. On 16 October 1950, news that the People's Liberation Army was advancing towards Chamdo and had taken the town of Riwoche (which could block the route to Lhasa) arrived. Ngabo and his men retreated to a monastery, where the People's Liberation Army surrounded and captured them. After the Battle of Chamdo, Ngabo wrote to Lhasa suggesting a peaceful surrender instead of war. According to the Chinese negotiator, "It is up to you to choose whether Tibet would be liberated peacefully or by force. It is only a matter of sending a telegram to the PLA group to recommence their march to Lhasa." Ngabo accepted Mao's Seventeen-Point Agreement, which stipulated that in return for Tibet becoming part of the People's Republic of China, it would be granted autonomy. Lacking support from the rest of the world, the Dalai Lama sent a telegram to Mao accepting the agreement in August 1951.

Although the annexation of Tibet by the PRC is referred to as the "Peaceful Liberation of Tibet" in Chinese government historiography, the 14th Dalai Lama and Tibetan exile groups view it as colonization or invasion. After the 1959 Tibetan Uprising, the Dalai Lama repudiated the agreement saying he had approved it under duress. The Chinese government points to improvements in health and the economy as justifications for their assertion of power in what it calls a historically-Chinese region. According to the Dalai Lama, China has encouraged Han Chinese immigration into the region.

Before the signing of the Seventeen Point Agreement on 23 May 1951, Tibet's economy was dominated by subsistence agriculture, but the stationing of 35,000 Chinese troops during the 1950s strained the region's food supplies. When the Dalai Lama visited Mao Zedong in Beijing in 1954, Mao told him that he would move 40,000 Chinese farmers to Tibet.

As a part of the Great Leap Forward in the 1960s, Chinese authorities coerced Tibetan farmers to cultivate maize instead of barley (the region's traditional crop). The harvest failed, and thousands of Tibetans starved.

==== Cultural Revolution ====
The Cultural Revolution was initiated by Mao and carried out by his supporters within the Chinese Communist Party, notably the Gang of Four, from 1966 to 1976 in order to preserve Maoism as China's leading ideology. It was an intra-CCP struggle to eliminate political opposition to Mao.

The Cultural Revolution affected all of China, and Tibet suffered as a result. Red Guards attacked civilians, who were accused of being traitors to communism. More than six thousand monasteries were looted and destroyed. Monks and nuns were forced to leave their monasteries and "live a normal life", and those who resisted were imprisoned. Prisoners were forced to perform hard labor, tortured and executed. Although the Potala Palace was threatened, Premier Zhou Enlai intervened and restrained the Tibetan Red Guards.

==== Recent developments ====
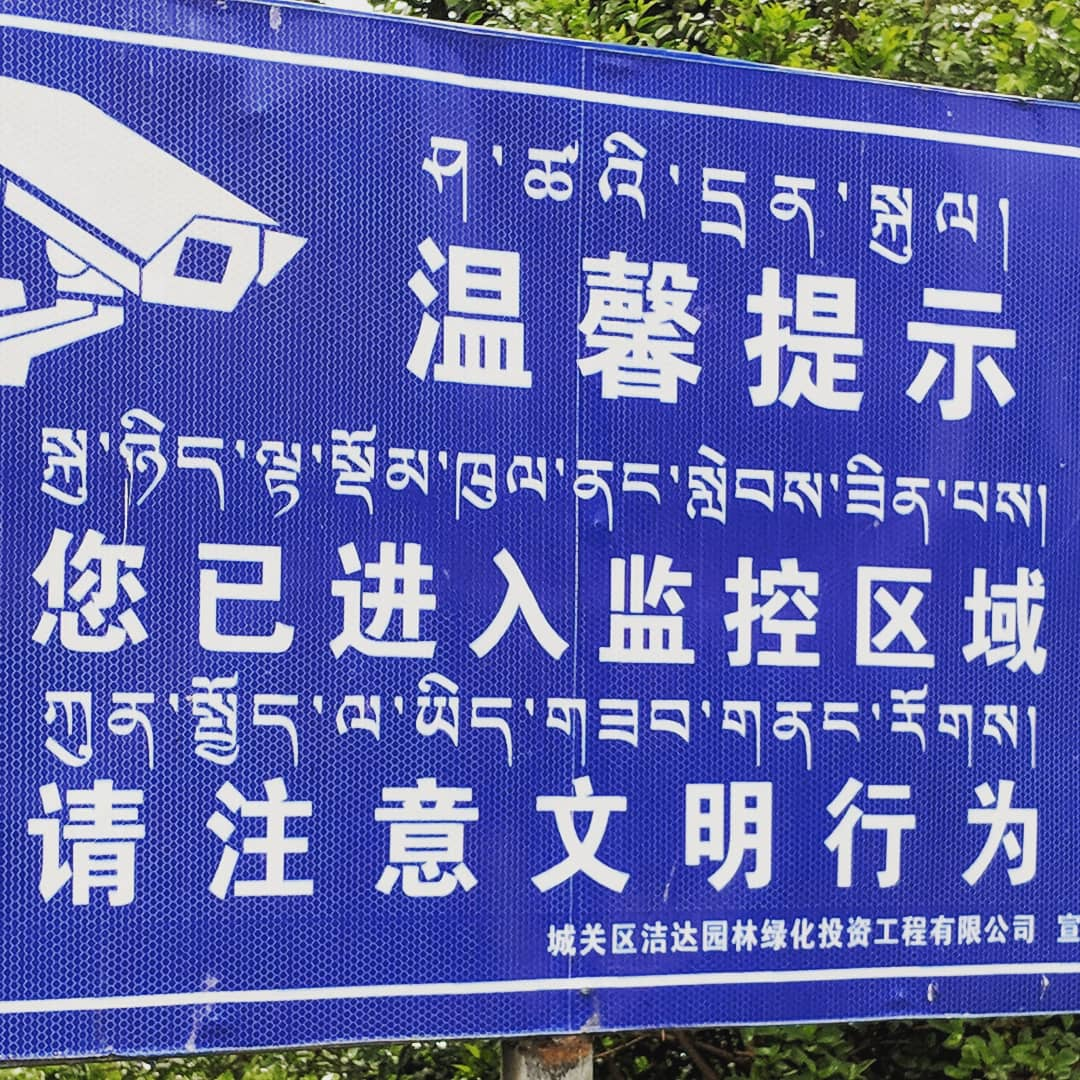
A sign (in Tibetan and Chinese) indicating surveillance cameras near the Monument to the Peaceful Liberation of Tibet, Lhasa, Tibet, 2018

In 1984, the CTA claimed that 1,207,387 Tibetans had died "of unnatural causes" under Chinese rule since 1950. Chinese officials denied carrying out political executions in Tibet.

China's National Strategic Project to Develop the West, introduced during the 1980s after the Cultural Revolution, encourages the migration of Chinese people from other regions of China into Tibet with bonuses and favorable living conditions. People volunteer to be sent there as teachers, doctors and administrators to assist Tibet's development. Citing an unqualified labor force and less-developed infrastructure, the Chinese government has encouraged migrants to stimulate competition and change Tibet from a traditional to a market economy with the reform and opening up initiated by Deng Xiaoping.

Tibetans are the majority ethnic group in the Tibet Autonomous Region, making up about 93 percent of the population in 2008. The 2008 attacks by Tibetans on Han- and Hui-owned property were reportedly due to the large Han Hui influx into Tibet.

According to George Fitzherbert, "To engage with China's arguments concerning Tibet is to be subjected to the kind of intellectual entrapment, familiar in the Palestinian conflict, whereby the dispute is corralled into questions which the plaintiff had never sought to dispute. Tibetans complain of being robbed of their dignity in their homeland by having their genuinely loved leader incessantly denounced, and of being swamped by Chinese immigration to the point of becoming a minority in their own country. But China insistently condemns such complaints as separatism, an offence in China under the crime of 'undermining national unity', and pulls the debate back to one about Tibet's historical status. Foreigners raise questions about human rights and the environment, but China again denounces this as a foreign intervention in the internal affairs of a sovereign nation, and pulls the debate back to Tibet's historical status."

The Chinese government has attempted to develop Tibet as part of its China Western Development policy and has invested 310 billion yuan (about 45.6 billion U.S. dollars) in Tibet since 2001. In 2009 it invested over $7 billion into the region, 31 percent more than the previous year. The Qinghai-Tibet Railway was completed in 2006 at a cost of $3.68 billion, leading to increased tourism from the rest of China. The Shanghai government contributed $8.6 million to the construction of the Tibet Shanghai Experimental School, where 1,500 Tibetan students receive a primarily-Chinese education. Some young Tibetans feel that they are Tibetan and Chinese, and are fluent in Tibetan and Mandarin Chinese.

In August 2020, CCP General Secretary Xi Jinping gave a speech in which he stated that it is "necessary to actively guide Tibetan Buddhism to adapt to the socialist society and promote the Sinicization of Tibetan Buddhism."

In August 2021, the Associated Press reported that Wang Yang stated in front of the Potala Palace that efforts are needed to ensure that Tibetans share the "cultural symbols and images of the Chinese nation." In August 2026, the CCP committee secretary of Tibet Wang Junzheng asked Gyaltson Norbu to support "efforts" to integrate Tibet more closely into China, promote the sinicization of Tibetan Buddhism, and encourage Tibetans to support the CCP.

===== 2026 Law on Promoting Ethnic Unity and Progress =====
The Law on Promoting Ethnic Unity and Progress is the People's Republic of China's (PRC) guiding legislation concerning ethnic minorities. The law was introduced by the National People's Congress (NPC)'s Ethnic Affairs Committee and submitted to the NPC on 8 September 2025. It was signed into law on 12 March 2026 and enacted on 1 July 2026. The law codifies CCP general secretary Xi Jinping's policies regarding the sinicization of ethnic minorities. The law has been widely criticized by scholars, the United Nations High Commissioner for Human Rights, multiple governments, former United Nations special rapporteurs, and human rights activists outside of China. The law's promotion of extraterritorial enforcement has been likened to transnational repression.

== Religion ==
The Chinese Communist Party and government claims it will control how the 15th Dalai Lama will be chosen, contrary to centuries of tradition. Chinese government officials repeatedly warn "that he must reincarnate, and on their terms".

When the Dalai Lama confirmed a Tibetan boy in 1995 as the reincarnation of the Panchen Lama, the second-ranking leader of the Gelugpa sect, the Chinese government took away the boy and his parents and installed its own child lama. The Dalai Lama's choice, Gedhun Choekyi Nyima's whereabouts are still unknown. The Chinese government claimed he has a "stable" job and a "normal" life. In 2020 US Secretary of State Mike Pompeo said in a statement that "Tibetan Buddhists, like members of all faith communities, must be able to select, educate and venerate their religious leaders according to their traditions and without government interference [...] We call on the PRC government to immediately make public the Panchen Lama's whereabouts and to uphold its own constitution and international commitments to promote religious freedom for all persons." The head of the Kagyu sect, the Karmapa Ogyen Trinley Dorje, was also groomed by Chinese leaders, but at age 14 he fled to India in 1999.

Within Tibet, schools issue warnings to parents that students should not be attending classes at monasteries, a long-standing tradition, or engage in any religious activity. Punishments for doing so are severe, including loss of government welfare and subsidies.

The practice of removing prayer flags, symbols of Tibetan culture and religious belief, has increased since 2010 as the persecution of religion escalates. In June 2020 Chinese authorities started a "behavioral reform" program, begun in the Tibet Autonomous Region's Qinghai's Golog (in Chinese, Guoluo) and Tengchen (Dingqing) county in Chamdo, ordering the destruction of prayer flags. The 2019 Tibetan Centre for Human Rights and Democracy annual report found that Chinese police forces and surveillance teams moved into monasteries and villages to monitor Tibetan residents for signs of opposition to China's rule, "facial-recognition software and careful monitoring of digital spaces [were] deployed to suppress political protests against the increased clampdowns on civil and political rights."

According to the United States Commission on International Religious Freedom, during the summer of 2019, the Chinese authorities demolished thousands of residences at the Yachen Gar Tibetan Buddhist center in Sichuan Province, displacing as many as 6,000 monks and nuns. In April 2019, China authorities closed the Larung Gar Buddhist Academy to new enrollment. Authorities also intensified a crackdown on possessing or displaying photos of the Dalai Lama, continued to monitor religious festivals, and, in some areas, banned students from attending festivals during their school holidays. In protest of repressive government policies, at least 156 Tibetans have self-immolated since February 2009.

== Education, employment, and language ==
The Chinese Constitution guarantees autonomy in ethnic regions and says local governments should use the languages in common use. Beginning in the early 2000s, there had been a process of Tibetanization of Tibetan education in Qinghai's Tibetan regions. Through grassroots initiatives by Tibetan educators, Tibetan had been somewhat available as the main language of instruction in primary, secondary and tertiary education in Qinghai. In Tibetan areas, official affairs are conducted primarily in Chinese. It is common to see banners promoting the use of Chinese. Monasteries and schools often held classes on the written language for ordinary people, and monks gave lessons while traveling, but officials ordered monasteries and schools to end the classes.

Chinese government policy requires only Tibetan government job candidates to disavow any allegiance to the Dalai Lama and support government ethnic policies, as announced in October 2019 on the TAR government's online education platform.

Tibetan entrepreneur and education advocate Tashi Wangchuk was detained for two years and then indicted in 2017 by court officials after speaking to The New York Times for a documentary video and two articles on Tibetan education and culture.

According to American political scientist Barry Sautman in September 2024, many schools in Tibet still have around five hours of instruction in Tibetan a week in addition to Mandarin, and the growth of a bilingual professional class among Tibetans has lessened the historical animosity between them and Han Chinese.

=== Schools ===
In 1987, the Tibet Autonomous Region published more explicit regulations calling for Tibetan to be the main language in schools, government offices and shops. Those regulations were eliminated in 2002 and state language policies and practices "jeopardize the continuing viability" of Tibetan civilization. Under the general secretaryship of Xi Jinping, Tibetan-language instruction of children has increasingly ceased and Tibetan children are sent to Mandarin-only boarding schools.

The CCP issued orders in December 2018 forbidding informal classes taught by Tibetan monks or other unapproved groups, and ordered schools to stop teaching all subjects in Tibetan, except the Tibetan language in first grade classes, in May 2019 in Golog, in Chinese, Guoluo, Tibet Autonomous Region. Private Tibetan schools have been forced to close.

In April 2020, classroom instruction was switched from Tibetan to Mandarin Chinese in Ngaba, Sichuan.

Neidi, which are state-run boarding schools, have been in operation since 1985 and continue to increase enrollment. Tibetan children are removed from their families and Tibetan religious and cultural influences, and placed in Tibetan-only boarding schools across China, well outside the Tibet Autonomous Region. Parents refusing boarding schools have reportedly been threatened with fines. The Tibet Action Institute, in their May 2025 report, "When They Came to Take Our Children", alleges that four-year-old children are being sent to these boarding schools, where they are beaten for praying and wearing Buddhist religious symbols, and taught only in Mandarin.

== Resettlement of nomadic herders ==
The Chinese government launched an initiative that demanded the nomads to relocate to urban housing in newly constructed villages in 2003. At the end of 2015, in "what amounts to one of the most ambitious attempts made at social engineering, the Chinese government is in the final stages of a 15-year-old campaign to settle the millions of pastoralists who once roamed China's vast borderlands," the Chinese government claimed it will have moved the remaining 1.2 million nomad herders into towns that provide access to schools, electricity and modern health care. This policy, based on the government view that grazing harms grasslands, has been questioned by ecologists in China and abroad claiming the scientific foundations of nomad resettlement are questionable. Anthropological studies of government-built relocation centers have documented chronic unemployment, alcoholism and the fraying of millenniums-old traditions. Human rights advocates say the many protests by herders are met with harsh crackdowns by security forces.

In a 2011 report, the United Nations Special Rapporteur on the Right to Food, criticized China's nomad resettlement policies as overly coercive and said they led to "increased poverty, environmental degradation and social breakdown".

In 2017 Tibetan nomads previously forced from traditional grazing lands in a state-directed resettlement scheme in Qinghai were told to go back due to a new policy announced in 2016, so authorities could use their current homes for development as tourist centers and government employees housing. "After two years of living in the new towns, residents are now being forced to move back to their original grasslands without their animals, which are the main source of livelihood in Tibetan nomadic communities".

== Growth of Lhasa's population ==
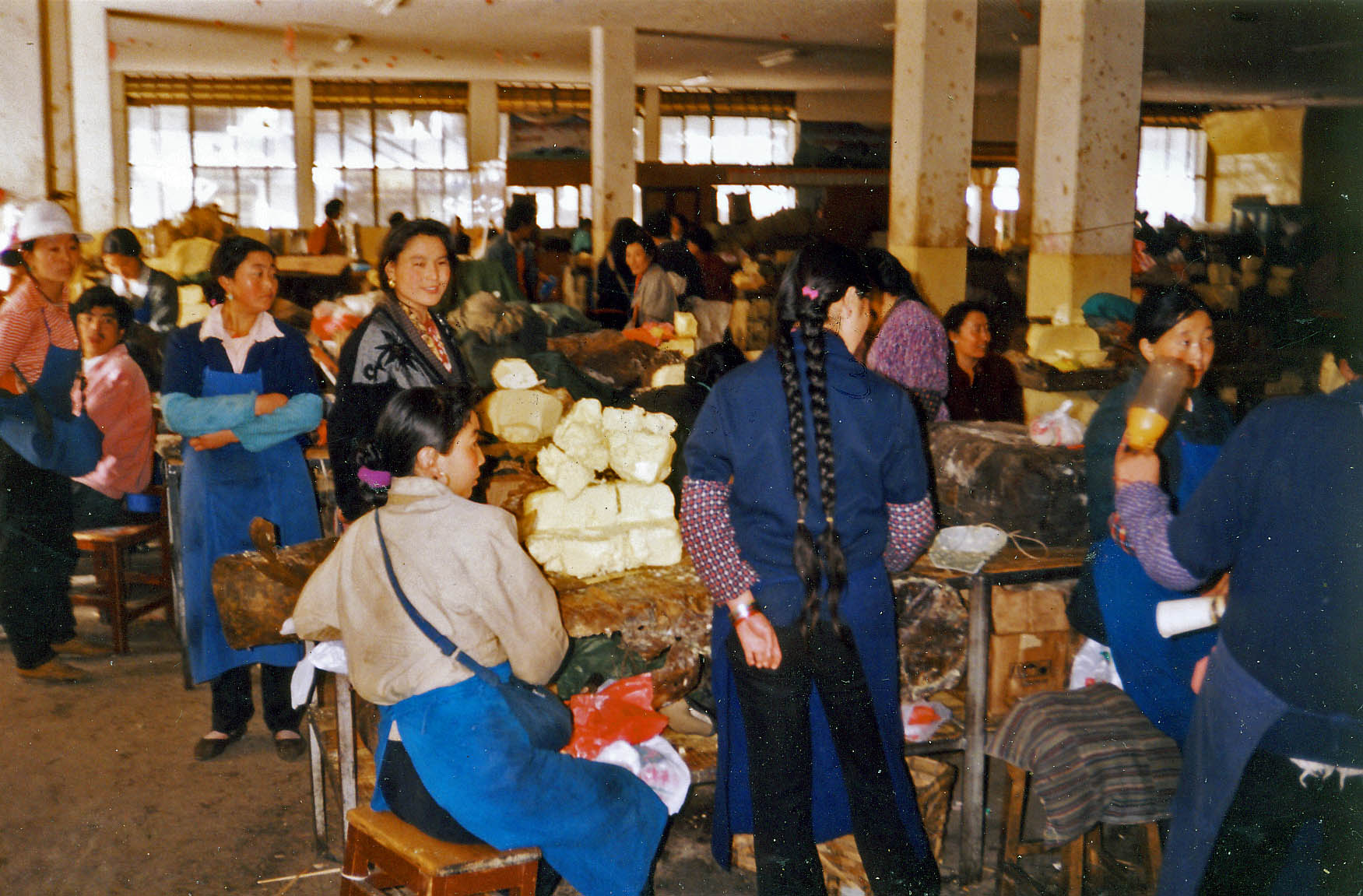
Market in Lhasa, 1993

Government-sponsored Chinese settlements in Tibet have changed the demographics of Tibet's population, especially the demographics of Lhasa's population. In 1949, there were between 300 and 400 Han-Chinese residents in Lhasa. In 1950, the city covered less than three square kilometers and it had around 30,000 inhabitants; the Potala Palace and the village of Zhöl which is located below it were both considered separate from the city. In 1953, according to the first population census, Lhasa had about 30,000 residents (including 4,000 beggars, but not including 15,000 monks).

In 1992, Lhasa's permanent population was estimated to number a little under 140,000, including 96,431 Tibetans, 40,387 Han-Chinese, and 2,998 Chinese Muslims and others. Added to that figure were 60,000–80,000 temporary residents, primarily Tibetan pilgrims and traders.

== Debate about the intention of the PRC ==
In 1989, the high-profile French criminal lawyer Robert Badinter was interviewed during an episode of Apostrophes (a well-known French television program which is devoted to human rights) with the Dalai Lama. Referring to the disappearance of Tibetan culture, Badinter used the phrase "cultural genocide". In 1993, the Dalai Lama used the same phrase to describe the destruction of Tibetan culture. During the 2008 Tibetan unrest, he accused the Chinese of committing cultural genocide during their crackdown.

In 2008, Robert Barnett, director of the Program for Tibetan Studies at Columbia University, stated that it was time for accusations of cultural genocide to be dropped: "I think we have to get over any suggestion that the Chinese are ill-intentioned or are trying to wipe out Tibet." Barnett voiced his doubts in a review in the New York Review of Books: "Why, if Tibetan culture within Tibet is being 'fast erased from existence', [do] so many Tibetans within Tibet still appear to have a more vigorous cultural life, with over a hundred literary magazines in Tibetan, than their exile counterparts?"

== See also ==
- Annexation of Tibet by the People's Republic of China
- Chinese settlements in Tibet
- Cultural repression in Tibet
- History of Tibet (1950–present)
- Human rights in Tibet
- Protests and uprisings in Tibet since 1950
- Chen Quanguo
- 70,000 Character Petition
- Labour camps in Tibet
- Tibetan independence movement
- Tibetan sovereignty debate
- Choekyi Gyaltsen, 10th Panchen Lama
- 11th Panchen Lama controversy
- Succession of the 14th Dalai Lama
- Religion in Tibet#Freedom of religion
- Antireligious campaigns of the Chinese Communist Party
- Freedom of religion in China#Buddhism
- Racism in China
- Chinese imperialism
- Chinese nationalism
- Han chauvinism
- Han nationalism
- Secession in China
- Sinocentrism
- Sinosphere
