= 70,000 Character Petition =

1962 book by Lobsang Trinley Chökyi Gyaltsen

A Poisoned Arrow: The Secret Report of the 10th Panchen Lama
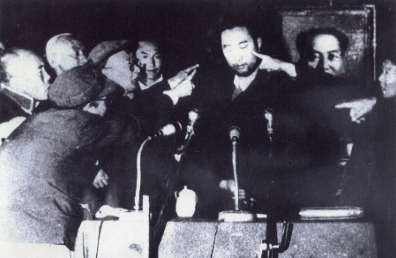
- Panchen Lama in a 1964 "struggle session"
- Author: Choekyi Gyaltsen, 10th Panchen Lama
- Translator: Robert Barnett
- Language: English, Chinese
- Series: TIN background briefing papers, no. 29.
- Subject: Actions of the Chinese government in Tibet
- Genre: Essay
- Published: 1996 (Tibet Information Network)
- Publication place: England
- Pages: 315
- ISBN: 978-0953201112
- OCLC: 39504353
- Dewey Decimal: 951/.505
- LC Class: DS740.5.T5 B75 1997

The 70,000 Character Petition (Chinese: 七万言书; Tibetan: ཡིག་འབྲུ་ཁྲི་བདུན་གྱི་སྙན་ཞུ, Wylie: Yig 'bru khri bdun gyi snyan zhu) is a report, dated 18 May 1962, written by the Tenth Panchen Lama and addressed to the Chinese government, denouncing abusive policies and actions of the People's Republic of China in Tibet. It remains the "most detailed and informed attack on China's policies in Tibet that would ever be written."

For decades, the content of this report remained hidden from all but the very highest levels of the Chinese leadership, until one copy was obtained by the Tibet Information Network (TIN) in 1996. (Note: The report (...) apparently circulated in China's top echelons for decades until a copy was delivered anonymously to the (Tibet Information Network) group.) The report was based in part on research undertaken in Amdo by an assistant, the 6th Tseten Zhabdrung, Jigme Rigpai Lodro, after China's brutal retaliation and reforms which followed a massive anti-communist uprising in 1958.

In January 1998 upon the occasion of the 60th anniversary of the birth of the 10th Panchen Lama, a translation by Tibetologist Robert Barnett entitled A Poisoned Arrow: The Secret Report of the 10th Panchen Lama was published by Tibet Information Network.

The document was initially known as the Report on the sufferings of the masses in Tibet and other Tibetan regions and suggestions for future work to the central authorities through the respected Premier Zhou Enlai but took on the shorter sobriquet because of its length in Chinese characters. When published, its authenticity could not be independently confirmed and Chinese authorities refrained from commenting. Several months later, Ngabo Ngawang Jigme (a retired high-ranking government and military official who was in office in Tibet from the early 1950s to 1993), officially criticized the petition's comments on the famine without challenging its authenticity nor criticizing its publication. (Note: Ngabo's comments on the famine are a criticism of the information in the Panchen Lama's petition, but he does not challenge its authenticity or express any criticism of its publication.)

== Background ==
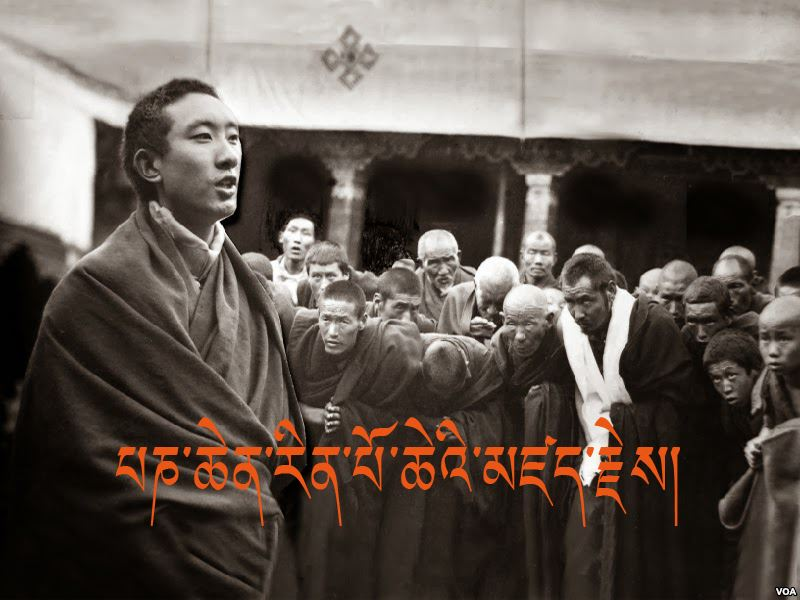
Panchen Lama with monks in Tibet, date unknown

Following the departure into exile of the 14th Dalai Lama Tenzin Gyatso in 1959, the 10th Panchen Lama was offered the presidency of the preparatory committee for the establishments of the Tibet Autonomous Region. In 1960, the Chinese named him vice-chairman of the National People's Congress in order that he act as the spokesperson for Chinese policy in Tibet. In this capacity, the 10th Panchen Lama travelled extensively throughout Tibet and nearby provinces with Tibetan populations where he witnessed famine and suffering caused by the policies of Mao's Great Leap Forward. In 1962, he met with Westerners in Lhasa, (Note: The Panchen Lama had a house there and visited frequently.) the capital of the current Tibet Autonomous Region. He affirmed to them his desire to "fulfill his revolutionary duty towards the people" and to "live the life of a good Buddhist." The Panchen Lama returned to Beijing on Mao's orders. During the voyage, throngs of Tibetans begged him to "end all the deprivation and hardships we've suffered." In Beijing, he asked Mao directly to "put an end to the abuses committed against the Tibetan people, to increase their food rations, to provide adequate care for the aged and the infirm, and to respect religious liberty." Mao listened politely but no measures were undertaken.

The Panchen Lama was only 24 when he wrote the petition. His entourage tried to persuade him to soften the tone of his petition, but he refused.

So it was that in 1962 the Panchen Lama wrote the Chinese Prime Minister Zhou Enlai a document known as the 70,000 Character Petition in which he denounced the draconian policies and actions of the Chinese People's Republic in Tibet. He criticized the Great Leap Forward and a multitude of "inept orders" on the part of the Chinese Communist Party (CCP) which had caused chronic food shortages.

The report by the Panchen Rinpoche deals with the Tibetan situation in plain terms, taking his cues from Mao's project: "Even if on paper and in speeches there has been a great leap forward, it's not clear that this has translated to reality."

== Writing the petition ==
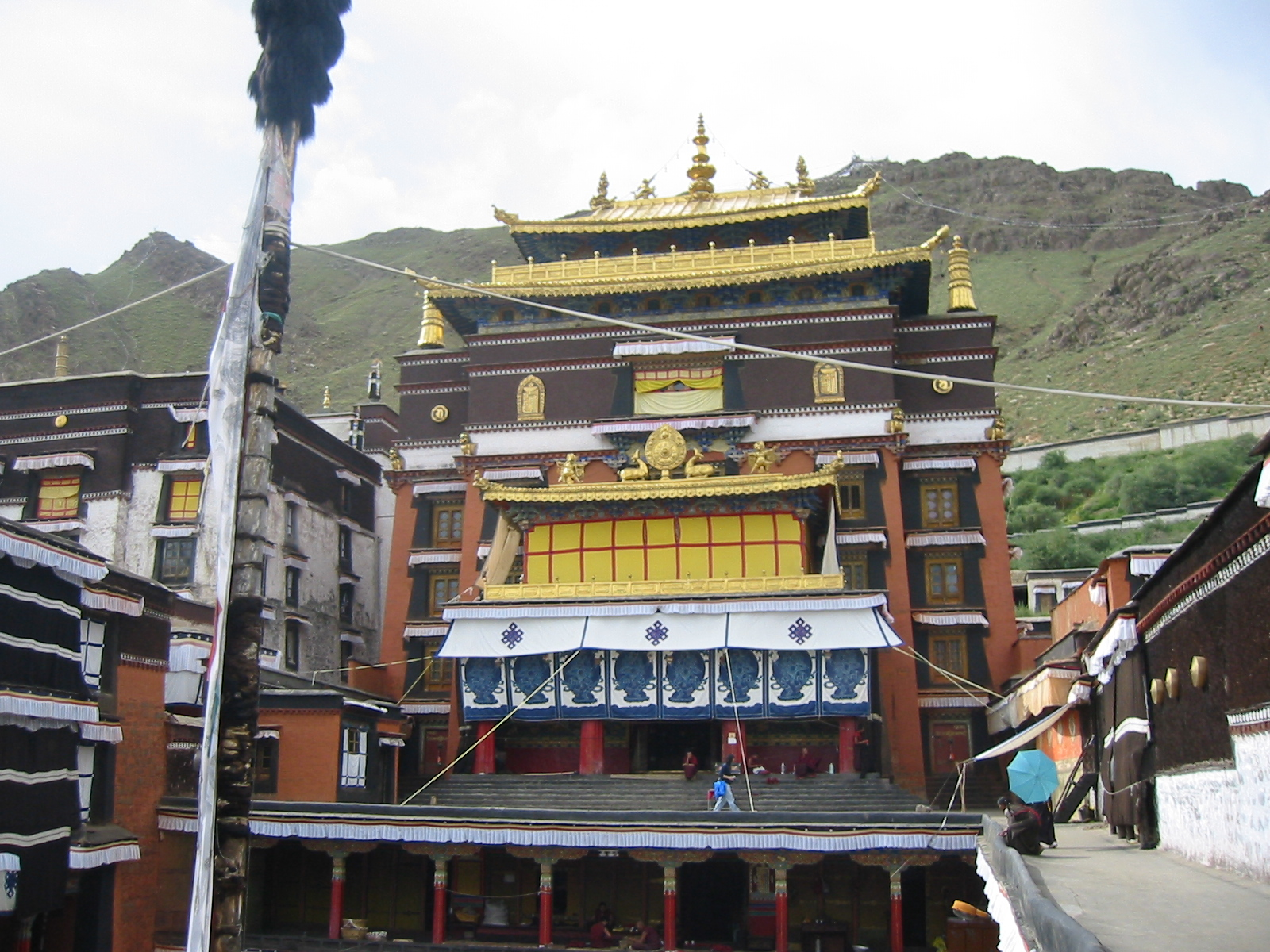
Monastery of Tashilhunpo

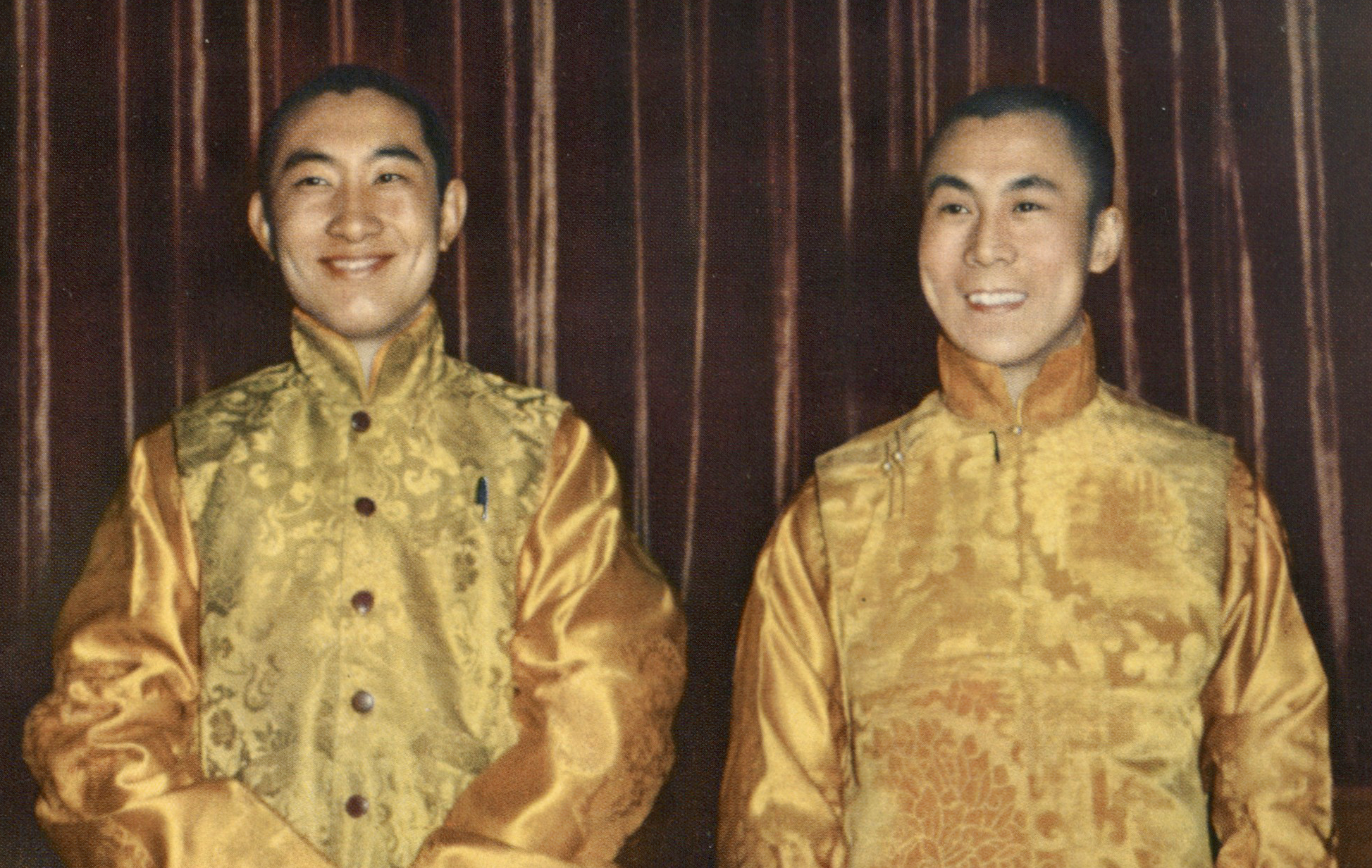
Panchen Lama to the left of the 14th Dalai Lama in the mid-1950s

The Panchen Lama began writing his petition in the monastery of Tashilhunpo in Shigatse, Tibet, continued in his residence in Lhasa, and finished it in Beijing. His stated objective in writing it was "to benefit the Party and the people."

The Panchen Lama wrote the work in Tibetan and chose the title Report on the sufferings of the masses in Tibet and other Tibetan regions and suggestions for future work to the central authorities through the respected Premier Zhou Enlai and runs to 123 pages in Chinese translation but as the Chinese version contained 70,000 characters, the document became known as the 70,000 Character Petition.

The Panchen Lama confided in Chinese Minister of Foreign Affairs Chen Yi, one of Zhou Enlai's inner circle. Chen Yi reassured him in his denunciation of the Tibetan situation, and told him to "Tell everything you know and don't hold back."

In particular, the Panchen Lama showed Ngabo Ngawang Jigme an early draft of his petition. Ngabo advised him to moderate his report and only to deliver it orally to the Central Committee, advice not heeded by the Panchen Lama.

== Petition structure ==
The essay covers three main themes - religion, cruelty, and famine - in eight parts:

1. The struggle to crush rebellions;
2. Democratic reforms;
3. Livestock, agricultural production, and the life of the masses;
4. The work of the United Front;
5. Democratic centralism;
6. The dictatorship of the Proletariat;
7. Religious questions;
8. Work for ethnic nationalities.

In his conclusion, the Panchen Lama denounced the majority leftist tendencies in Tibet.

== Excerpts ==
In his preface for the English translation, Robert Barnett observed that "in no other document does someone of such high rank attack so explicitly and with as much detail the policies and practices of Chairman Mao." Some excerpts:

=== Religion ===
The Panchen Lama explained that anyone who openly practiced their religious faith in Tibet was persecuted and accused of superstition. The Communists forced monks and nuns to have sexual relations. The leadership of monasteries was entrusted to characters with dissolute behavior who "frequented prostitutes and drank excessively" and thus discrediting the monasteries in the eyes of Tibetans.

"After the introduction of reforms, Buddhism suffered a serious setback and is now on the edge of disappearance."

The Panchen Lama considered that the heart of Buddhism was being targeted, and that prayer ceremonies, philosophical discussions, and instruction were no longer possible.

=== Arrests ===
"Numerous prisoners died of afflictions after the introduction of the dictatorship of the proletariat. The population of Tibet found itself in considerably reduced circumstances these last few years. Besides the aged, women, and children, most able-bodied and intelligent men from the Tibetan regions of Qinghai, Gansu, Sichuan and Yunnan provinces were imprisoned."

=== Suppression of demonstrations ===
The Panchen Lama criticized the unjust suppression that the Chinese inflicted on Tibetans in response to the 1959 Tibetan uprising.

"We have no way of knowing how many people were arrested. In each region, there were at least 10,000 arrests. Good and bad, innocent and guilty, all were imprisoned in contradiction with any legal system in the world. In some areas, most of the men were imprisoned, leaving only women, the elderly, and children to work."

"They even ordered the killing members of rebel families... Officials deliberately put people in jail under draconian conditions, so there was a lot of unjustifiable deaths."

=== Famine ===
The Panchen Lama denounced the famine in Tibet, criticizing the Great Leap Forward because a multitude of "inept orders" by the Chinese Communist party caused chronic food shortages.

"First of all, you should ensure that the people will not die of starvation. In many parts of Tibet, the inhabitants died of starvation. Entire families perished and the death rate is extremely high. This is unacceptable, terrible and very grave. Once upon a time Tibet lived through a dark age of barbaric feudalism, but there were never any such shortages of food, especially after the rise of Buddhism. In the Tibetan regions, the masses are living in such poverty that the elderly and children are dying of starvation or are so weak that they are unable to fight off diseases and they die. Never anything like this has ever happened before in the entire history of Tibet. No one could imagine such terrible famines, not even in your worst dreams. In some areas, if someone gets a cold, they inevitably contaminate hundreds of other people and the majority die."

=== Forced abortion ===
The Panchen Lama ended his report with accusations of forced abortions starting in 1955 in Kham and Amdo.

== Reactions ==
The Tenth Panchen Lama met with Prime Minister Zhou Enlai and discussed his report with him on May 18. The initial reaction was positive. Zhou summoned Tibetan authorities to Beijing. They promised him to rectify what they called "a leftist detour." Zhou "had admitted that errors had been committed in Tibet" but did not authorize open opposition to the powers in place. Nevertheless, following his pattern of bending to the Maoist winds, he abandoned the Panchen Lama to his fate once Mao's criticisms were heard.

=== Criticism ===
According to jurist Barry Sautman, professor in social sciences at the Hong Kong University of Science and Technology, the 10th Panchen Lama supposedly visited three counties on the northeastern edge of Tibet before authoring his report: Ping'an, Hualong and Xunhua, and his description of famine concerns only the region he is from, namely Xunhua. These three regions are located in Haidong Prefecture, a zone in the Qinghai province in which 90% of the population is non-Tibetan either in origin or culture. Furthermore, a former leader of the Tibet Autonomous Region disputes whether the Panchen Lama visited any region of Tibet before writing his report. (Note: Quotation from (Sautman 2006): in particular, Barry Sautman, "Demographic Annihilation" and Tibet, p. 242: In this respect it is worth noting that the Panchen Lama, upon whose writings the charges of a massive famine among Tibetans mainly rest, is said to have only visited three counties in "Tibet" prior to writing his report in 1962. These were Ping'an, Hualong, and Xunhua, and his comments on the famine pertain to his home county, Xunhua (Becker, 1996b; Panchen Lama 1962, 112–113). All three counties are in Haidong Prefecture, an area whose population is 90 percent non Tibetan and not in cultural Tibet. A former TAR leader, moreover, disputes that the Panchen Lama visited any Tibetan area during the famine (Becker 1998). Becker, Jasper. 1996b. "China's Northern Nomads Face a Bleak Future." South China Morning Post, (Hong Kong), September 28, 18.)

=== Praise ===
During a commemoration in 1999 of the 1959 Tibetan uprising, the Dalai Lama declared that "the 70,000 Character petition published in 1962 by the former Panchen Lama constitutes an eloquent historical document on the policies carried out by the Chinese in Tibet and on the draconian measures put in place there." In 2001, he added that the Panchen Lama "had specifically denounced the terrible conditions of life inflicted on the Tibetans in the interior of their country."

According to Stéphane Guillaume, the report, which remained secret until 12 February 1998, confirms the report of the International Commission of Jurists of December 1964 concerning the violations of human rights in contravention of United Nations General Assembly resolutions 1353 and 1723.

According to Joshua Michael Schrei, member of the administrative council of the independent association Students for a Free Tibet, the petition is considered by serious historians to be one of the only trustworthy documents of the period.

Historian and journalist Patrick French considers the Petition to give the clearest picture of the period. (Note: Quotation from (French, 2005) "Reading the charts, looking at the numbers and trying to quantify death from data, I felt that the clearest picture of what happened to Tibetans at this time came not from statistics, but from the Panchen Rinpoche's report.")

According to professor Dawa Norbu "no Chinese (with the possible exception of Peng Dehuai) and certainly no leader of a national minority ever dared to defy the Communist policies so fundamentally in the interior of the People's Republic since its creation in 1949, as the Panchen Lama did in 1962 and in 1987.

Laurent Deshayes and Frédéric Lenoir view the analysis given by Hu Yaobang, secretary general from 1980 to 1987 of the CCP during his inspection of the Tibet Autonomous Region as approaching those of the 10th Panchen Lama in his 70,000 Character petition and that of the Tibetan Government in Exile: the Chinese policy towards Tibet seems to resemble colonialism, the Tibetans are under-represented in the regional administration, their standard of living has fallen since the liberation of 1951–59, and their culture is threatened with extinction unless there is an effort to teach the language and the religion.

== Implementation of propositions ==
According to TIN, propositions in the 70,000 Character petition were implemented between 1980 and 1992 by Chinese reformer Hu Yaobang, consistent with the policies of Deng Xiaoping during the 1980s.

Tseten Wangchuk, a Tibetan journalist working in the United States, reported that during a 1980 meeting between the General Secretary of the Chinese Communist Party Hu Yaobang and the Panchen Lama, the latter told Hu "how much he was moved by his reforms, and remarked that had the suggestions of the 70,000 Character petition been put in place when they were proposed, the problems in Tibet would not have endured."

The 70,000 Character petition was founded on the principle that the specific characteristics of Tibet should be taken into account.This premise was central to the policies of Deng Xiaoping in China during the 1980s and allowed the Panchen Lama to introduce numerous liberalizations into Tibet. In early 1992, the CCP removed the concession concerning the "specific characteristics" of Tibet, and current policy monitors religious practices and the monasteries, limits the instruction of Tibetan language, and has since suppressed some of the religious and cultural liberalizations implemented by Hu and requested by the Panchen Lama.

== See also ==
- Sinicization of Tibet
- Birth control in Tibet
- Tibet Famine (1960–1962)
- Hu Yaobang's Tibet inspection tour
- Great Chinese Famine

== Notes and references ==
Notes

== Sources ==
- Bergère, Marie-Claire (1987). La République populaire de Chine de 1949 à nos jours [The People's Republic of China from 1949 To Today] (in French). A. Colin. ISBN 978-2-200-31228-2. OCLC 299413945.
- French, Patrick (2004). Tibet, Tibet: A Personal History of a Lost Land. Harper Perennial. ISBN 978-0-00-717755-4. OCLC 56411606.
- French, Patrick (2005). Tibet, Tibet: une histoire personnelle d'un pays perdu [Tibet, Tibet: A Personal History of a Lost Land]. Collections Litterature (in French). Vol. 6108492. Translated by William Oliver Desmond. Albin Michel. ISBN 978-2-226-15964-9.
- Chos-kyi-dbaṅ-phyug; Tibet Information Network (1997). A poisoned arrow: the secret report of the 10th Panchen Lama; the full text of the Panchen Lama's 70.000 character petition of 1962, together with a selection of supporting historical documents. TIN background briefing papers (in English and Chinese). Vol. 29. Tibet Information Network. ISBN 978-0953201112. OCLC 39504353.
- P. Christiaan Klieger, A Poisoned Arrow: The Secret Report of the 10th Panchen Lama, Tibet Information Network (TIN), The Tibet Journal, Spring Vol. XXIV, No. 1 1999, p. 146.
- Mehra, Parshotam (2004). "Part VIII The Aftermath of the Rebellion Chap. 28. The Panchen Lama's Seventy Thousand Character 'petition'". From Conflict to Conciliation: Tibetan Polity Revisited : a Brief Historical Conspectus of the Dalai Lama-Panchen Lama Standoff, Ca. 1904-1989. Asiatische Forschungen. Vol. Bd. 148. Höllmann, Thomas O. Wiesbaden: Otto Harrassowitz Verlag. p. 152. ISBN 978-3-447-04914-6. OCLC 56966963.
- Sautman, Barry; Dreyer, June Teufel (2006). Contemporary Tibet: Politics, Development, and Society in a Disputed Region. Armonk, New York: M.E. Sharpe. ISBN 978-0-7656-1354-7. OCLC 56590699.
- van Grasdorff, Gilles (1998). Panchen-Lama, otage de Pékin [Panchen Lama, Hostage of Beijing] (in French). Paris: Ramsay. ISBN 2-84114-283-3.
- van Grasdorff, Gilles (1999) [1st pub. Panchen-Lama, otage de Pékin, Ramsay:1998]. Hostage of Beijing: The Abduction of the Panchen Lama. Translated by Géraldine Le Roy. Element. ISBN 978-1-86204-561-3. OCLC 41257320.
- van Grasdorff, Gilles (2006). La nouvelle histoire du Tibet [The New History of Tibet] (in French). le Grand livre du mois. ISBN 978-2-286-02560-1. OCLC 470507828.
- Yeshi, Kim (2009). Tibet: histoire d'une tragédie [Tibet: History Of A Tragedy] (in French). Editions de la Martinière. ISBN 978-2-7324-3700-2. OCLC 797172999.
