= Barry Sautman =

Canadian-American academic and commentator

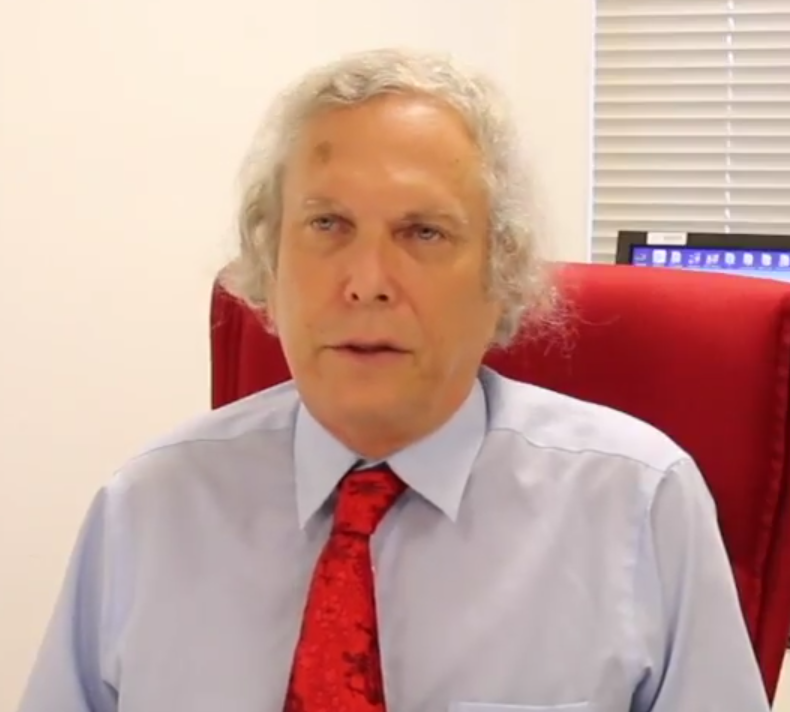
- Born: Barry Victor Sautman; July 11, 1949 (age 77)
- Education: University of California, Los Angeles (M.L.S., J.D.); New York University (L.L.M.); Columbia University (PhD)
- Occupations: professor, lawyer
- Scientific career
- Workplaces: HKUST; Princeton University
- Thesis: Retreat from Revolution. Why Communist Systems Deradicalize (1990)

Barry Victor Sautman (born July 11, 1949) is a professor emeritus with the Division of Social Science at the Hong Kong University of Science and Technology. He holds both Canadian and American nationalities and he speaks both English and Cantonese.

Sautman is a political scientist and lawyer by training who primarily teaches international law. He has conducted research about ethnic politics and nationalism in China, as well as China–Africa relations, and is a frequent commentator on Chinese state media.

== Graduate education ==
- 1979: Master of Library Sciences, University of California, Los Angeles (UCLA)
- 1982: Juris Doctor in Law, University of California, Los Angeles (1981–82 at NYU School of Law)
- 1985: Legum Magister in Law, New York University
- 1990: Doctor of Philosophy in Political Science, Columbia University, New York, PhD thesis title: Retreat from Revolution. Why Communist Systems Deradicalize

== Work experience ==
From 1983 to 1985, he was a law clerk and from 1985 to 1991, an attorney.

From fall 1990 to spring 1991, he was an adjunct assistant professor at California State University, Northridge, teaching courses in US politics.

In 1991–1992, he was a visiting assistant professor in comparative politics at the Johns Hopkins University-Nanjing University Center for Chinese and American Studies, in Nanjing, China. He taught courses in comparative politics; politics, law & society; political development; and US-China relations.

From 1993 to 2000, he was an assistant professor in the Division of Social Science at Hong Kong University of Science & Technology, then from 2000 to 2008, an associate professor at the same university.

In 2002–2003, he was also a visiting fellow in the Department of East Asian Studies at Princeton University.

He taught undergraduate courses in international law; politics, law and society; China-US relations; political development; and comparative politics; and also graduate courses in nationalism, ethnicity, and US hegemony.

== Fields of research ==
His areas of research have been Communist and post-Communist systems; Chinese politics (especially ethnic politics); the political economic and legal aspects of the Tibet and Xinjiang issues; China-Africa links; the supposed strategic rivalry between the US and China in Africa; and international law (especially human rights).

== Reception ==
Sautman, due to his positions on Tibet and rejection of the notion of repression or cultural genocide, has drawn criticism from writers supportive of an independent or free Tibet such as Jamyang Norbu and Elliot Sperling. Jamyang Norbu called Sautman a "running-dog propagandist" in 2008 and accused him of selectively using dubious facts and figures, skillfully applying "academic gobbledygook", and jumping to conclusions without citing evidence. Sautman responded to Norbu's criticism in an article in Phayul.com, stating "Being attacked by Jamyang Norbu is like being criticized by John Bolton."

In 2011, Australian sinologist Colin Mackerras described Sautman as the main contributor to Tibet studies in Hong Kong's universities, stating that:

Sautman tends to be defensive of China, including both its claim to Tibet on historical and legal grounds and its main essential policies towards its ethnic minorities, especially the Tibetans. Because this is not a fashionable position in Western countries nowadays, he has become a controversial figure, and because he is so well informed and his research so thorough, he is often invited to represent pro-Chinese positions in forums dealing with Tibet.

In August 2025, Hong Kong magazine The Points described Sautman as a "scholar who once wrote decently on Tibet, but then in recent years has turned into a pro-PRC parrot" and criticized him for his downplaying China's persecution of the Uyghurs. A former student of Sautman, Huang Weiguo, noted that he had become more pro-PRC in recent years. Another social scientist stated that Sautman "is now acting like a major Chinese propaganda tool" and noted his commentaries on the state-run channel CGTN. In 2026, Cornell University anthropologist Magnus Fiskesjö, who compiled the Uyghur Human Rights Project (UHRP), called Sautman's book published the same year a "genocide-denialist screed".

== Publications ==
=== Journal articles ===
- 1985. The meaning of "Well-Founded Fear of Persecution" in United States Asylum Law and in International Law, Fordham International Law Journal, Vol. 9, Issue 3, pp. 483–539
- Sautman, Barry (1997). "Racial Nationalism and China's External Behavior". World Affairs. 160 (2): 78–95. ISSN 0043-8200. JSTOR 20672513.
- 1997. The Tibet Question: Meeting the Bottom Lines, in Problems of Post-Communism, Vol. 44, Issue 3, pp. 15–24
- 1998. Preferential Policies for Ethnic Minorities in China: The Case of Xinjiang, in Nationalism and Ethnic Politics (Special Issue: Nationalism and Ethnoregional Identities in China), Vol. 4, Issue 1-2, 1998, pp. 86–118
- 1998. Affirmative Action, Ethnic Minorities and China’s Universities, in Pacific Rim Law & Policy Journal, University of Washington, Vol. 7, Issue 1, 1998, pp. 77–86
- 1999. Ethnic Law and Minority Rights in China: Progress and Constraints, in Law & Policy, Vol. 21, Issue 3, pp. 283–314, July 1999
- 2000. Is Xinjiang an Internal Colony?, in Inner Asia, Vol. 2, Issue 2, pp. 239–271
- 2000. Association, Federation and 'Genuine' Autonomy: the Dalai Lama's Proposals and Tibet Independence, in China Information, Vol. 14, pp. 31–91
- Sautman, Barry (2001). "Peking Man and the Politics of Paleoanthropological Nationalism in China". The Journal of Asian Studies. 60 (1): 95–124. doi:10.2307/2659506. JSTOR 2659506. PMID 19086346.
- 2001. Is Tibet China's Colony? The Claim of Demographic Catastrophe, in Columbia Journal of Asian Law, Vol. 15, Issue 1 (Fall), pp. 81–131
- 2001. Tibet: Myths and Realities, in Current History. A Journal of Contemporary World Affairs, September 2001, Vol. 100, Issue 647, pp. 278–283
- 2003. "Cultural Genocide" and Tibet, in Texas International Law Journal, Vol. 38, Issue 2, pp. 173–246
- 2005. China's Vulnerability to Ethnic Minority Separatism in Tibet, in Asian Affairs: an American Review, Vol. 31, Issue 2, pp. 87–118
- 2006. Colonialism, Genocide and Tibet, in Asian Ethnicity, Vol. 7, Issue 3, pp. 243–265
- 2007. (with Yan Hairong), Friends and Interests: China's Distinctive Links with Africa, in African Studies Review, vol. 50, No. 3, pp. 75–114
- 2008. (with Yan Hairong), Fu Manchu in Africa: the Distorted Portrayal of China's Presence in the Continent, in South African Labour Bulletin, November, Vol. 31, Issue 5, pp. 34–38
- 2008. Barry Sautman's response to Jamyang Norbu's opinion piece 'Running-Dog Propagandists', Phayul.com, August 4
- 2008. Protests in Tibet and Separatism. The Olympics and Beyond (Expanded version), in China Left Review, Issue 1
- 2008. (with Kenneth King) Steven Spielberg, China and Darfur, in China Left Review, Issue 1
- 2010. "Vegetarian Between Meals". The Dalai Lama, War and Violence, in Positions: East Asia Cultures Critique, Vol. 18, Issue 1, pp. 89–143
- 2010. Tibet's Putative Statehood and International Law, in Chinese Journal of International Law, Vol. 9, Issue 1, pp. 127–142
- 2011. (with Yan Hairong) Gilded Outside, Shoddy Within : The Human Rights Watch report on Chinese copper mining in Zambia, in The Asia-Pacific Journal : Japan Focus, Vol. 9, Issue 52, No 1, December 26 (translation into French under the title "Néocolonialisme ou racisme : critiques d'une entreprise minière", in Société de stratégie, May 2012)
- 2011. (with Yan Hairong) The ‘Right Dissident’: Liu Xiaobo and the Nobel Peace Prize, in Positions: East Asia Cultures Critique, Vol. 19, Issue 2, pp. 581–613
- 2012. Tibet’s Suicidal Politics, in East Asia Forum, March 21
- 2012. (with Yan Hairong) Chasing Ghosts: Rumors and Representations of the Export of Chinese Prison Labour to Developing Countries, in China Quarterly, No 210 (June), pp. 398–418 ( Abridged Chinese version, 2013 社会观察; full Chinese version in 李安山 & 刘海方, 中国非洲研究评论 2012 (北京: 社科文献出版社, 2013)
- 2013. Ethnic Policies: China vs US and India, The Adelaide Review, September 10

=== Book chapters ===
- 1995. Theories of East Asian Intellectual and Behavioral Superiority and the "Clash of Civilizations", in Racial Identities in East Asia, Barry Sautman Ed., Hong Kong: Division of Social Science, Hong Kong University of Science and Technology, pp. 58–121
- 1997. Myths of Descent, Racial Nationalism and Ethnic Minorities in the People's Republic of China, in Frank Dikötter (ed.), The Construction of Racial Identities in China and Japan: Historical and Contemporary Perspectives, University of Hawaii Press, Honolulu, pp. 75–95, ISBN 962-209-443-0.
- 1999. Year of the Yak: the Tibet Question in Contemporary US-China Relations, in The Outlook for U.S.-China Relations Following the 1997-1998 Summits: Chinese and American Perspectives on Security, Trade, and Cultural Exchange, Edited by Peter H. Koehn, Joseph Y.S. Cheng, Chinese University Press, Hong Kong, 403 p., pp. 181–205
- 1999. Expanding Access to Higher Education for China's National Minorities: Policies of Preferential Admission, in China's National Minority Education Culture, Schooling, and Development, Edited by Gerard A. Postiglione, Falmer Press, New York, pp. 173–210
- 2000. Legal Reforms and Minority Rights in China, in Handbook of Global Legal Policy (Stuart Nagel ed.), CRC Press, 560 p., pp. 71–102
- 2004. Hong Kong as a Semi-Ethnocracy: 'Race,' Migration, and Citizenship in a Globalized Region, in Agnes Ku & Pun Ngai (eds.), Remaking Citizenship in Hong Kong: Community, Nation, and the Global City, Routledge, New York, pp. 115–138
- 2005–2006. (with Baogang He), The Politics of the Dalai Lama's New Initiative for Autonomy, in Pacific Affairs, Vol. 78, Issue 4 (Winter 2005–2006), pp. 601–629 - aussi sous le titre Dalai Lama's New Initiative for Autonomy, in Paula Banerjee and Samir Kumar Das (eds.), Autonomy: Beyond Kant and Hermeneutics, Anthem Press, London, 2007, pp. 235–260.
- 2006. Introduction: Cultural Genocide in International Context and Tibet and the (Mis-) Representation of Cultural Genocide, in Barry Sautman (ed.), Cultural Genocide and Asian State Peripheries, Palgrave Macmillan, New York, 279 p., pp. 1–37 and 165–279, ISBN 9781403975744
- 2006. Introduction: the Tibet Question in Contemporary Perspective (with Yan Hairong) and 'Demographic Annihilation' and Tibet, in Barry Sautman & June Teufel Dreyer (eds.), Contemporary Tibet: Politics, Development and Society in a Disputed Region, ME Sharpe, Armonk, pp. 3–22, pp. 230–257, ISBN 0765613549
- 2012. Ethnicity in China: Politics, Policies and Consequences, in Handbook of Contemporary China, Edited by William S Tay, Alvin Y. So, World Scientific, New Jersey; Hong Kong

=== Editorship ===
- 1995. Racial Identities in East Asia, edited by Barry Sautman, Hong Kong: Division of Social Science, Hong Kong University of Science and Technology (proceedings of the international conference held in Hong-Kong on November 25 and 26, 1994)
- 2006. Cultural Genocide and Asian State Peripheries, edited by Barry Sautman, Palgrave Macmillan, New York, ISBN 9781403975744
- 2006. Contemporary Tibet: Politics, Development and Society in a Disputed Region, edited by Barry Sautman & June Teufel Dreyer, ME Sharpe, Armonk

=== Monographs ===
- 1990. Retreat from Revolution. Why Communist Systems Deradicalize, University Microfilms International, Ann Arbor, Michigan, 1990, 669 p.
- 1995. (with Shiu-hing Lo), The Tibet Question and the Hong Kong Experience, Maryland Occasional Papers/Reprints Series in Contemporary Asian Studies, No. 2 - 1995 (127), 82 p., ISBN 0925153397
- 2002. (with Ellen Kneehans), The Politics of Racial Discrimination in Hong Kong, Maryland Monograph Series in Contemporary Asian Studies, No. 2-2002 (169), 83 p., ISBN 0925153850
- 2006. (with Yan Hairong), East Mountain Tiger, West Mountain Tiger: China, Africa, the West, and 'Colonialism' in Africa, Maryland Monograph Series in Contemporary Asian Studies, No. 3-2006 (186), 77 p., ISBN 1-932330-16-X ISBN 978-1-932330-1-68
- 2009. 'All that Glitters is Not Gold': Tibet as a Pseudo-State , Maryland Series in Contemporary Asian Studies, No 3-2009, 86 p., ISBN 1-932330-28-3 ISBN 978-1-932330-28-1
- 2011. (with Li Ying) Public Diplomacy from Below: the 2008 'Pro-China' Demonstrations in Europe and North America, University of Southern California Annenberg School Center on Public Diplomacy Series, Paper No 11, ISBN 1-932800-97-2 ISBN 978-1-932800-97-5
- 2012. (with Yan Hairong), The Chinese are the Worst?: Human Rights and Labor Practices in Zambian Mining, Maryland Series in Contemporary Asian Studies, 2012, 100 p., ISBN 1-932330-39-9 ISBN 978-1932330-39-7

== Other academic services ==
- Founder of the journal Asian Ethnicity and member of its Board of Editors
- Author of reviews in China Quarterly, China Journal, Pacific Affairs, Asian Ethnicity, East Asia

== Lectures ==
In 2013, Sautman was the speaker at the Adelaide Confucius Institute's annual Public Lecture.

== Reviews of the author's contributions ==
- In China Journal, July 2006, Issue 56, p. 213, review by Mark Stevenson of Contemporary Tibet: Politics, Development, and Society in a Disputed Region
- In China Review International, Spring 2007, Vol. 14, Issue 1, p. 203, review by Ronald Schwartz of Contemporary Tibet: Politics, Development, and Society in a Disputed Region
