= Cultural repression in Tibet =

The cultural suppression in Tibet refers to a range of policies and actions carried out by the People's Republic of China that critics and human rights organizations argue have systematically undermined Tibetan religious, linguistic, ethnic, and cultural identity. These measures have been documented since China's annexation of Tibet in 1951 and have continued to the present day.

The suppression has taken multiple forms, including the destruction of monasteries and religious artefacts beginning in the 1950s, restrictions on Tibetan Buddhist practice, forced sedentarization of nomadic communities, promotion of Han Chinese migration into Tibetan areas, and policies that limit the use of the Tibetan language in education and public life. Tibetan writers, artists, and intellectuals have also faced detention, imprisonment, and censorship.

International bodies, including the United Nations and the International Commission of Jurists, have repeatedly raised concerns about these policies. The Chinese government characterizes its policies in Tibet as developmental and stabilizing, while Tibetan advocacy groups and various governments have called for greater protections for Tibetan culture and human rights.

== Background ==
Tibet was a de facto independent state in East Asia that lasted from the collapse of the Qing dynasty in 1912 until its annexation by the People's Republic of China in 1951.

The British and Russian empires vied for influence in Tibet in the 1910s, attempting unsuccessfully to form an agreement with China regarding the region's status. After the 13th Dalai Lama's death in 1933, the Kuomintang-ruled Nationalist government of the Republic of China opened a mission in Lhasa to restart negotiations but no agreements followed.

By 1949 the Chinese Communist Party had defeated the Nationalist government in the civil war, and in 1951 annexed the Ü-Tsang and a portion of Chamdo regions of Tibet.

In October 1950, the People's Liberation Army entered Chamdo, defeating sporadic resistance from the Tibetan Army. In 1951, representatives of the Tibetan authorities participated in negotiations in Beijing with the Chinese government, resulting in the Seventeen Point Agreement which affirmed China's sovereignty over Tibet. It was ratified in Lhasa a few months later. China described the signing of the agreement as the "peaceful liberation of Tibet".

== Types ==
=== Religious ===
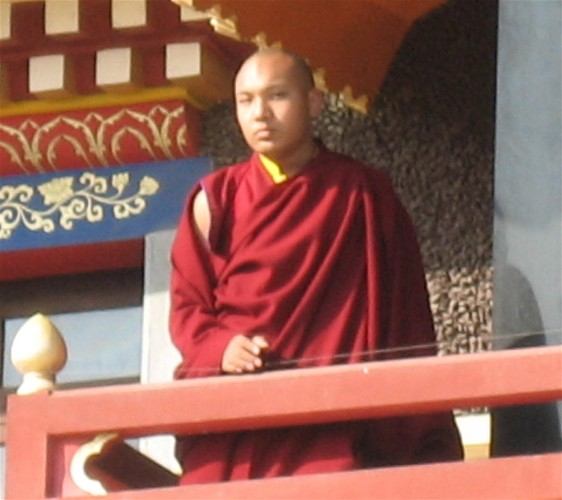
The 17th Karmapa, Ugyen Trinley Dorje

Chinese policies targeting Tibetan religion began in the 1950s with the widespread destruction of temples, monasteries, and religious artefacts. Although some have been rebuilt since the 1980s, much of Tibet's cultural heritage and lineage remain lost and irreplaceable, diminishing Buddhist institutions and scholarship due to the disruption of Dharma transmission across generations and the absence of lineage holders. In an interview with the 17th Karmapa, Ugyen Trinley Dorje, by the International Campaign for Tibet in 2002, he explained:

"I have inherited an historic and religious responsibility, and it is my duty to uphold it. Therefore, as a young monk, I need to receive teachings from older teachers in my lineage in order to fulfill my duty. Specifically, this means that I need to receive the tantric initiation, the oral transmissions of texts, and the explanation of meditation techniques... I tried for many years to secure invitations for my teachers who reside outside of Tibet. This failed and thus my religious education was failing...so I left Tibet."

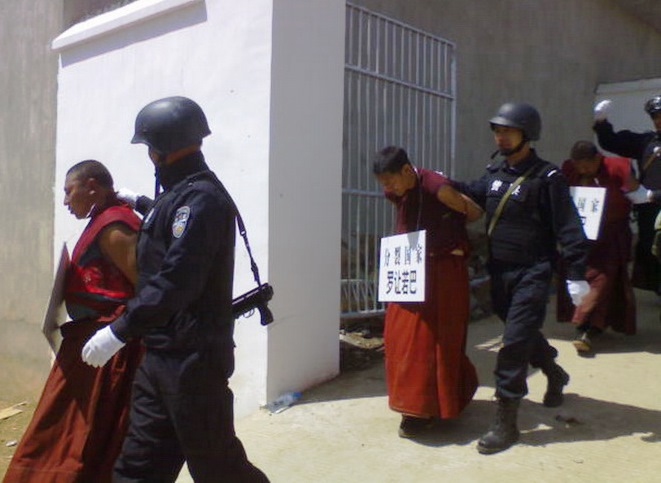
Tibetan monks arrested and imprisoned

The government continues to undermine Tibetan Buddhism through strict regulations, discouraging religious practices, enforcing patriotic education and manipulating internal divisions. Tactics include rhetorical attacks, public humiliation, detention, imprisonment, torture, collective punishment, and even killing of religious leaders and adherents. In 1987, the reforms taking place in both China and Tibet coincided with a wave of protests in Lhasa. That year, demonstrations initially began peacefully but quickly escalated after authorities violently attacked the monks who led them. Larger and more prolonged protests erupted in Lhasa in 1988 and 1989, both of which were met with severe repression. On March 5, 1988, police launched a brutal assault on a group of monks inside the Jokhang Temple, beating several to death and arresting others. Reports of torture in detention included repeated beatings, electric shocks, suspension from ropes, exposure to extreme cold, sleep deprivation, and attacks by dogs, all accompanied by relentless interrogations and political indoctrination. Tibetan Buddhist nuns arrested for protesting endured some of the most extreme brutality.

Security forces have increased the surveillance of Tibetan Buddhism since the 1990s, and resorted to abduction and severe methods in detention.

In October 2025, Chinese authorities conducted a four-day raid in Sangchu (Xiahe) County, Gansu, targeting Labrang Tashi Khyil Monastery and nearby Tibetan villages. The operation involved door-to-door searches and confiscated large quantities of Dalai Lama photographs, deemed illegal by local and central orders. Residents were intimidated into surrendering images. Communications were cut off from October 19, limiting information on the raid's aftermath.

Reports have also documented campaigns requiring the display of portraits of Chinese leaders, including Xi Jinping and Mao Zedong, in monasteries and Tibetan homes, replacing or restricting images of the Dalai Lama and other traditional religious iconography in some areas. In 2025, China enacted the Law on Promoting Ethnic Unity and Progress, which the government said was intended to strengthen national unity and foster a shared Chinese national identity. Critics, including Tibetan advocacy organizations and human rights groups, argued that the law could further restrict the use of minority languages and limit religious and cultural practices in Tibetan areas.

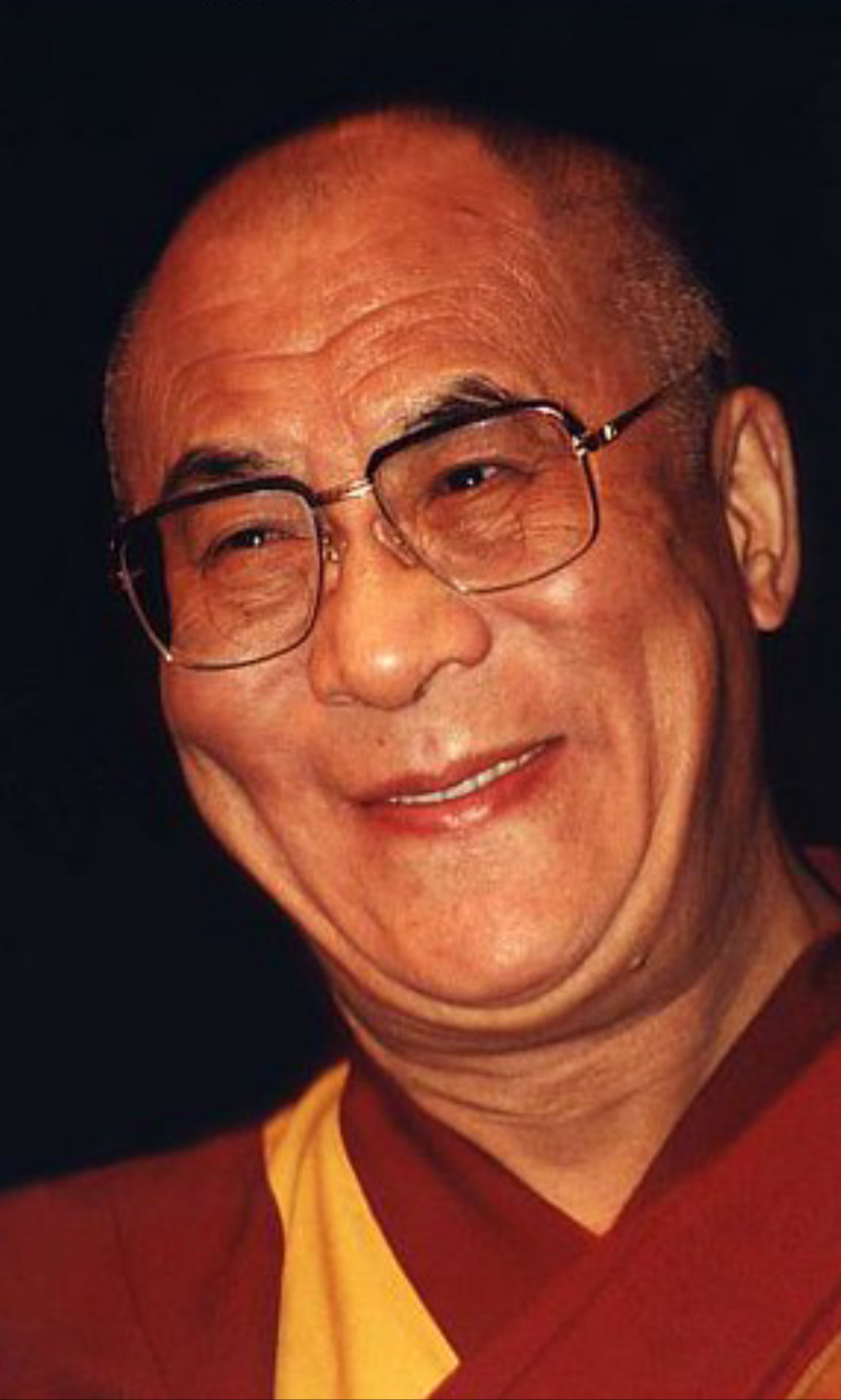
The 14th Dalai Lama

==== Recognition of reincarnated lamas ====
In July 2025, the 14th Dalai Lama announced that only the Gaden Phodrang Trust had the authority to recognize his successor, stating that no government or external institution should interfere in the process. The Trust stated that the search for his reincarnation would be conducted in accordance with Tibetan Buddhist traditions and in consultation with the heads of the Tibetan Buddhist schools. Chinese officials responded that the recognition of the next Dalai Lama must comply with Chinese law and historical conventions, including approval by the central government.

The succession of the Dalai Lama has significance for the Tibetan exile community, which regards the Dalai Lama as its spiritual leader and an enduring symbol of Tibetan identity. The announcement regarding his succession was widely viewed as having implications for the future of Tibetan Buddhism and the preservation of Tibetan religious and cultural traditions, particularly in light of the differing positions of the Dalai Lama and the Chinese government regarding the recognition of his successor.

=== Ethnic ===
Fieldwork interviews suggest that Tibetan enterprises have declined from nearly 80% in 1995 to less than 30% in 2005 due to being replaced by Han Chinese. The government has favoured Chinese by engaging them in the fields of traditional construction, making Tibetans slowly lose the capacity to participate in their own cultural work since they are not fluent in Chinese. The Tibet Museum now features exhibits that are more skewed towards Chinese history, which means cultural diversity and continuity in Tibet are under threat.

=== Linguistic ===
The Chinese party-state has enforced a series of policies that restrict linguistic rights by preventing the development and use of the Tibetan language in commerce, education, and administration within Tibetan areas; imposing Chinese as the primary language and enforcing an educational curriculum that serves state interests while denying Tibetan children opportunities for cultural development and expression. Any recognition of Tibetan culture by the party-state is largely driven by commercial or political interests.

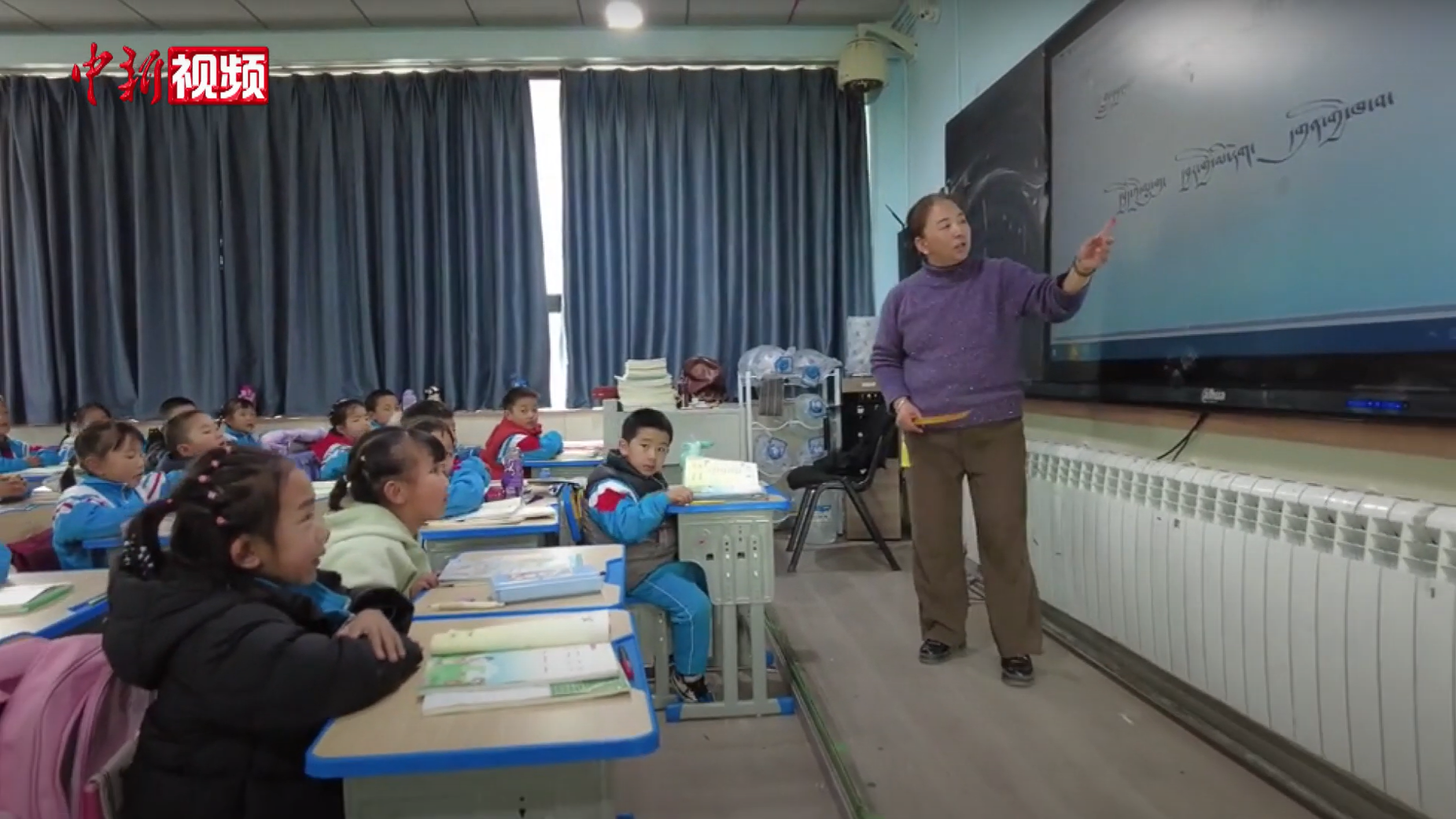
Teacher teaching Tibetan language

The Gongmeng report specifically emphasized the threat to the Tibetan language as a major source of frustration in Tibet:

"The importance of language for transmitting a nationality's culture goes without saying, and there are many in the Tibetan language teaching elite expressing concern about the current status quo. As the ethnic studies scholar Professor Ma Rong has written, 'The formal texts of a people's history, and the recalling for later generations of the people's own epic poems of heroism, a people's astronomy, mathematics, medicine, architecture, literature and agronomy this collection of knowledge and culture is all recorded in that people's written language. It is therefore a catalyst for that people's traditions and culture, entrusting and manifesting the deep emotions that a people's elite groupings and broad masses ha[ve] for their history and culture. A people's language becomes an emblem of that people's culture....."

The International Commission of Jurists wrote in its 1997 report on Tibet:

"Rather than instilling in Tibetan children respect for their own cultural identity, language and values, as required under the Convention [on the Elimination of All Forms of Racial Discrimination], education in Tibet serves to ideologically indoctrinate Tibetan children and to convey a sense of inferiority of their own culture, religion and language in comparison with the dominant Chinese culture and values."

According to a United Nations report released in Geneva on 6 February 2023, approximately one million Tibetan children have been placed in government-run residential schools where instruction follows a Chinese-language curriculum with limited access to Tibetan language, history, and culture. UN human rights experts expressed concern that this policy contributes to the erosion of Tibetan linguistic and cultural identity, including diminished ability among children to communicate in Tibetan with family members.

==== The survival of the Tibetan language ====
The Tibetan language has long been the principal medium of communication, religion, literature, and cultural identity for the Tibetan people. It is the foundation of Tibetan Buddhism and has preserved a rich religious, philosophical, and literary tradition for more than a millennium. However, the Tibetan language has faced increasing challenges under Chinese administration over the past six decades.

Against this backdrop, the 10th Panchen Lama (1938–1989) emerged as one of the leading advocates for the preservation of the Tibetan language, religion, and culture. In 1962, he submitted the 70,000 Character Petition to Mao Zedong, criticising Chinese policies in Tibet and documenting the impact of religious restrictions and political repression following the 1959 Tibetan uprising. As a consequence, he spent approximately fourteen years in prison or under house arrest.

Following his release, during the relatively liberal political climate of the early 1980s, the Panchen Lama travelled extensively across the Tibetan Plateau, observing the condition of Tibetan communities and advocating for the preservation of the Tibetan language. He regarded Tibetan as indispensable to monastic education and the transmission of Buddhist teachings. He also promoted the development of educational and religious institutions, helping to strengthen cooperation among major Tibetan Buddhist traditions and supporting institutions such as Lhasa University, North-West Minorities University, North-South Minority University, the Larung Gar Buddhist Institute, and numerous other colleges and monasteries.

The Panchen Lama's efforts reflected his conviction that the survival of the Tibetan language was inseparable from the preservation of Tibetan Buddhism and the continuity of Tibetan cultural identity. His work remains an important part of his legacy in Tibetan regions of present-day Qinghai and Sichuan.

=== Demographic ===
==== Forced relocation ====
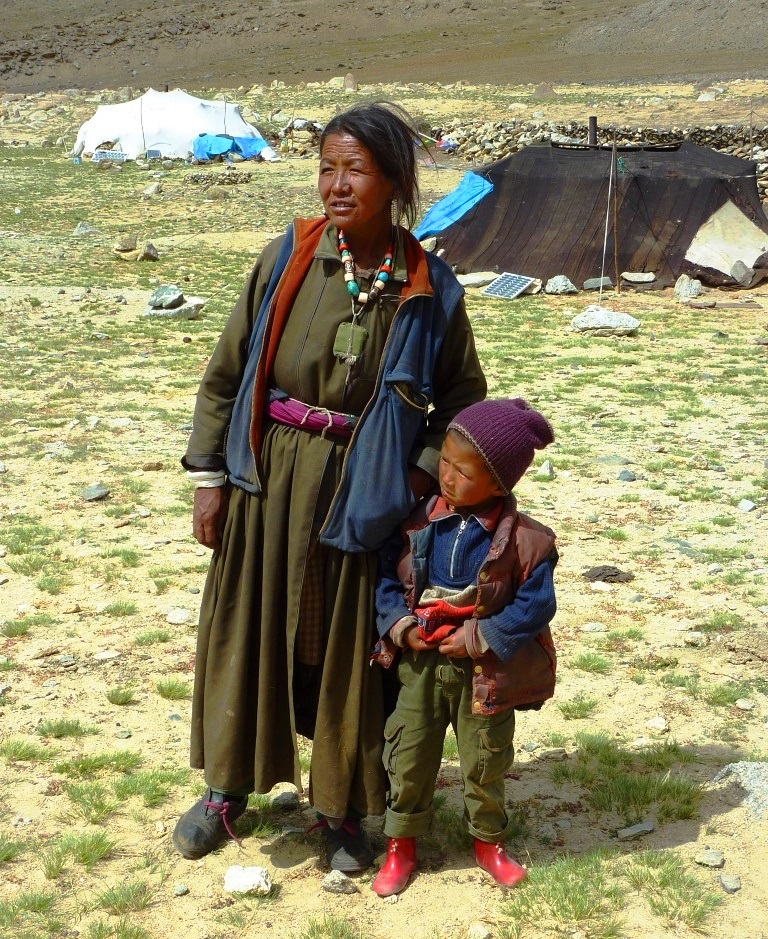
Tibetan nomad mother and son

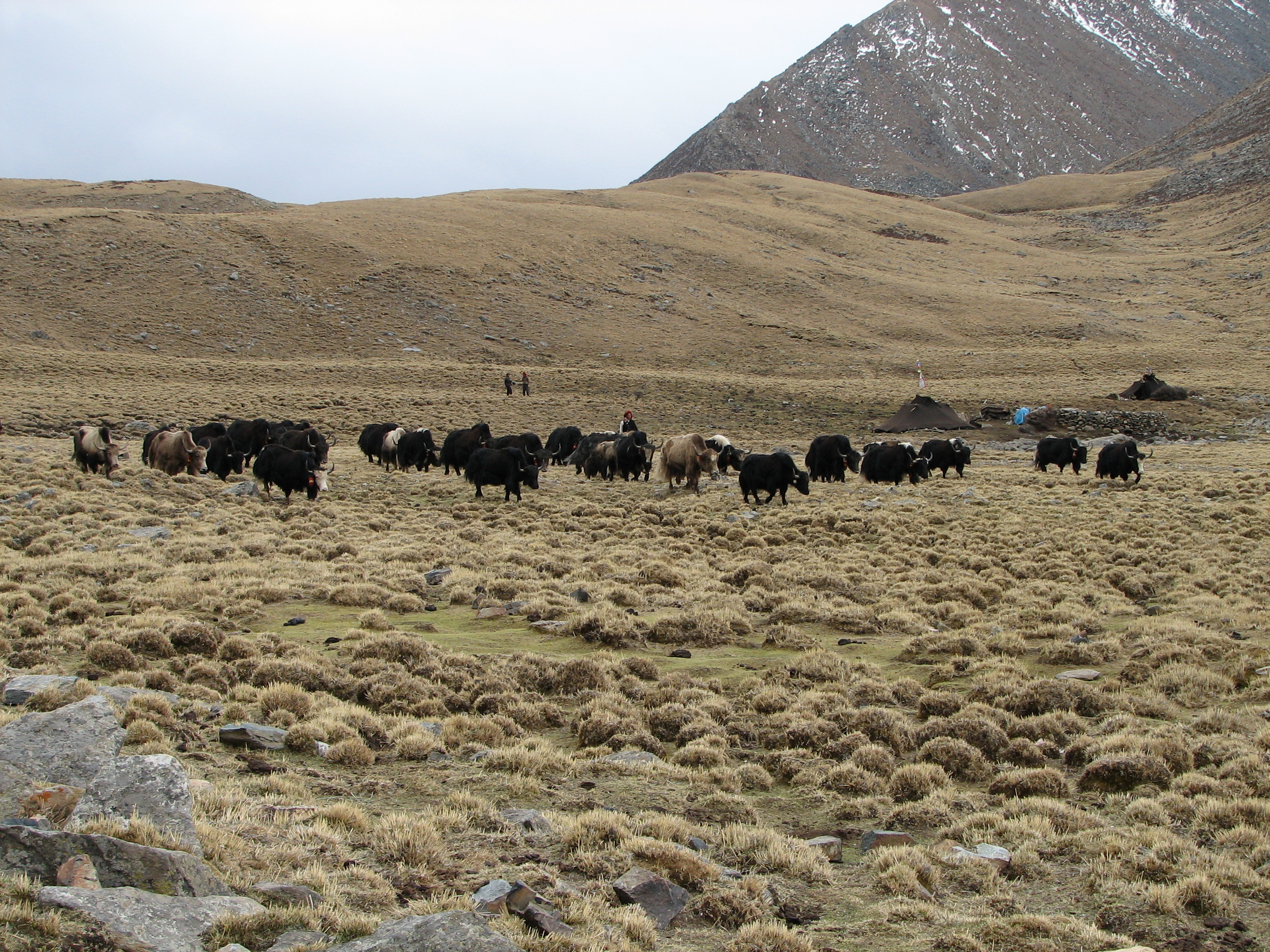
Nomadic Life in the Tibetan Plateau

Chinese policies have targeted Tibetan pastoralists through forced sedentarization, environmental regulations, and economic development strategies that have displaced them from their lands and traditional livelihoods. These measures, combined with mass in-migration of non-Tibetans and reliance on extractive industries, have marginalized Tibetans, making them a cultural and demographic minority in their own region. Additionally, these policies have severely impacted the Tibetan ecosystem, with broader ecological consequences for Asia. While economic benefits have primarily gone to non-Tibetans, Tibetans have suffered significant cultural and environmental losses. The mandated settlement has severed Tibetan nomads' deep connection with their animals and environment, rendering their generational knowledge of animal and grassland management obsolete.

A 2007 Human Rights Watch report on the permanent settlement of nomads in Tibet highlights the impact of this policy on a way of life practiced on the Tibetan Plateau. As one Tibetan in 2004 described the situation:

"They are destroying our Tibetan (herding) communities by not letting us live in our area and thus wiping out our livelihood completely, making it difficult for us to survive in this world, as we have been (herders) for generations. The Chinese are not letting us carry on our occupation and forcing us to live in Chinese-built towns, which will leave us with no livestock and we won't be able to do any other work."

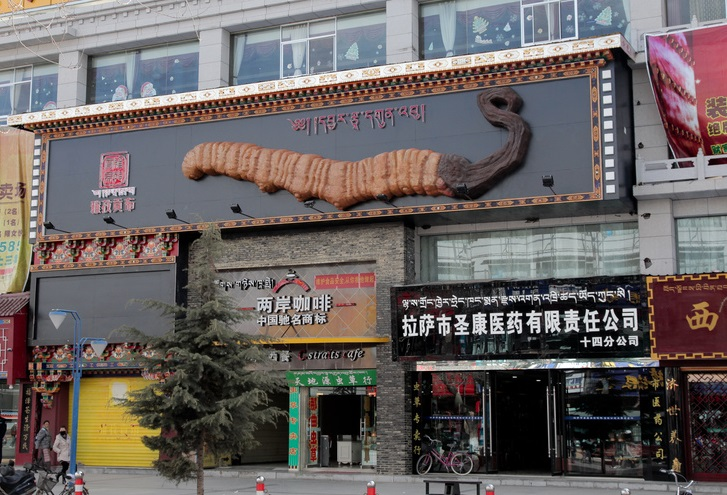
Caterpillar Fungus Store in Central Lhasa

With limited job prospects, many nomads turn to collecting and selling yartsa gunbu (caterpillar fungus), a highly valued ingredient in Chinese traditional medicine that commands a steep market price. There have also been instances of violent, even deadly, clashes over the trade of the fungus, as its scarcity increases and more people depend on it for their livelihood. In one incident in July 2007, reports indicate that eight people were shot and killed, while 50 others were injured in such a conflict.

=== Heritage destruction ===
In 2024, the forced construction of hydropower dams in Derge (Dege) County on the Drichu (upper Yangtze) River sparked peaceful protests by local Tibetans. The dams threaten to flood villages and centuries-old Tibetan Buddhist monasteries, forcing residents to relocate without consultation or consent. Many of these monasteries date back to the 13th century, including Wontoe Monastery and Yena Monastery, which preserve culturally significant relics, artifacts, and murals. These sites hold immense historical and cultural significance and are home to numerous Tibetan monks and nuns, meaning that their destruction would cause irreplaceable and irrevocable damage to both the cultural heritage and the monastic community.

In response, Chinese authorities carried out a crackdown, arresting monks and local residents, intimidating protesters, and restricting communication. The Tibetan Centre for Human Rights and Democracy – North America has called on China to stop the repression, release detainees, and respect the rights of Tibetans affected by these hydropower projects.

The protests were met with harsh measures, including the use of water bullets and electric weapons, resulting in injuries that required hospitalization for many. More than 1,000 Tibetans have reportedly been detained without adequate food or clothing. Authorities also blocked the internet and censored information about the protests on social media platforms as part of the wider crackdown. According to Tencho Gyatso of the International Campaign for Tibet, “China tries to hide its forced relocation of Tibetans, its destruction of their environment, and its attempts to wipe out their culture and religion.”

=== Censorship and anti-intellectualism ===
The government censors Tibetan-language publications that contradict the official narrative, detains and tortures writers, artists, and cultural figures, and commercializes Tibetan culture in a way that diminishes its significance, mainly for the benefit of non-Tibetans. The continued repression of Tibetan intellectuals, artists, and writers, particularly those working in the Tibetan language — is a longstanding practice. In 2004, Tibetan author and poet Woeser faced severe repercussions when her book Notes on Tibet was banned by Chinese authorities. She was dismissed from her editorial position at the Lhasa-based Chinese-language journal Tibetan Literature and ordered to devote her working hours to political re-education. Also her blog was hacked and shut down. Since then, Woeser, who now resides in Beijing, has been subjected to continuous harassment, including brief detentions, house arrests, travel restrictions, employment loss, denial of access to information, heavy surveillance, and censorship. A 2010 report by the International Campaign for Tibet (A Raging Storm: The Crackdown on Tibetan Writers and Artists after Tibet's Spring 2008 Protests) documented over 50 Tibetans who have faced consequences for expressing themselves through literature or the arts. These include:

- Kunchok Tsephel, founder of the Tibetan literary website Chodmey (Butter Lamp), sentenced to 15 years in prison for allegedly disclosing state secrets.
- Dokru Tsultrim, accused of sedition and supporting "Dalai-related motives" in his articles, leading to the banning of his Tibetan-language journal Khawai Tsesok (Lifeline of the Snow).
- Jamyang Kyi, a writer and singer, temporarily detained in April 2008.
- Dolma Kyab, author of Restless Himalayas, believed to be held in Chushul high-security prison near Lhasa.
- Kunga Tsayang, a writer, photographer, and blogger, sentenced to five years in prison in a closed-door trial in 2009.
- Tashi Rabten, author of Written in Blood and editor of Shar Dungri (Eastern Snow Mountain), a collection of essays on the 2008 Tibetan protests, serving a four-year sentence.

Authorities have also cracked down on Tibetans working for international NGOs, which provide training and professional opportunities for educated individuals in developing regions. These organizations face severe restrictions in Tibet, and Tibetan NGO workers endure heavy surveillance, interrogations, threats, and even detention. Nearly all international NGOs that previously operated in the Tibet Autonomous Region (TAR) have been forced to leave, a process that accelerated after the 2008 protests. Those that remain often employ a majority of Han Chinese staff and follow agendas closely aligned with government policies. A similar suppression of international organizations—especially those focused on Tibetans—has occurred in Tibetan areas of Qinghai, Sichuan, Gansu, and Yunnan provinces. Tibetan NGO workers in these regions report increasing difficulties in obtaining travel documents and have been told they must resign from their jobs to receive passports. The restrictions and pressure continue to tighten, severely limiting the ability of Tibetans to engage with the outside world.

== Methods ==
=== Propaganda, delegitimization, and ethnic discrimination ===
The Chinese party-state has systematically promoted propaganda that fosters racial and ethnic discrimination against Tibetans, particularly targeting domestic Chinese audiences. This sustained effort has fuelled societal and official tensions between Tibetans and Chinese. Through state-controlled narratives, Tibetan culture is portrayed as backward and in need of state-led modernization. Tibetans who assert their identity outside of sanctioned parameters are labelled as disloyal, while their most revered spiritual leader, the Dalai Lama, is subjected to deeply disrespectful attacks.

Tibetans face both official punishment and social exclusion, and even positive portrayals in Chinese media tend to be patronizing, depicting them as "grateful" minorities who have been "liberated" from so-called feudal darkness by the Chinese Communist Party. In response to self-immolation protests, Chinese authorities have escalated their rhetoric, branding self-immolators as "terrorists" or mentally ill and even likening the Dalai Lama's policies to those of the Nazis.

The pervasive and largely unchallenged negative stereotypes of Tibetans in Chinese media have shaped widespread public hostility toward them and their cultural aspirations. Since most Chinese citizens receive only selective, distorted information about Tibet's history and its relationship with China, they often lack empathy for Tibetans' struggle to preserve their identity. Rising nationalism in China, actively cultivated by the party-state as a pillar of legitimacy, has further intensified sensitivities to any criticism of China's policies in Tibet.

=== Crackdowns on dissent ===
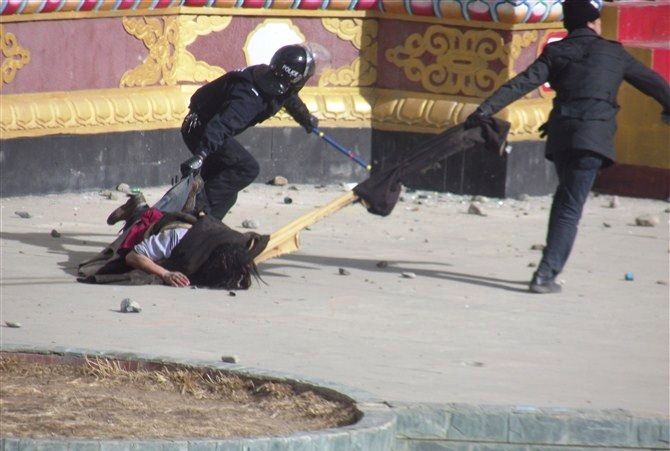
Aggressive violence against Tibetans

In the year following the March 10, 2008, protests in Lhasa and beyond, over 200 demonstrations erupted across the Tibetan plateau. Official Chinese figures indicate that more than 1,200 Tibetans were detained, many of whom suffered severe mistreatment in custody, with some still missing. Dozens of unarmed protesters were shot dead, while others perished in prison due to torture or took their own lives in the aftermath of the crackdown. Since then, the Chinese government has escalated its efforts to control Tibetan Buddhism, treating it as an urgent priority. Because many demonstrations were led by monks and nuns or took place in monasteries, authorities launched intensified patriotic education campaigns, detained and expelled large numbers of monastics, and at times used deadly force to suppress dissent. Chinese state media continues to depict the events solely as "violent riots" in Lhasa, even though these protests were peaceful to begin with. As a result, thousands of security forces were deployed across Tibet, surrounding monasteries with troops and imposing what was effectively martial law in many towns. The Tibetan plateau was almost entirely sealed off, with only controlled foreign media and diplomatic visits permitted. Authorities implemented sweeping measures to remove so-called "troublemakers" from monasteries and launched a systematic campaign against Tibetan Buddhism, described as "reminiscent of the Cultural Revolution."

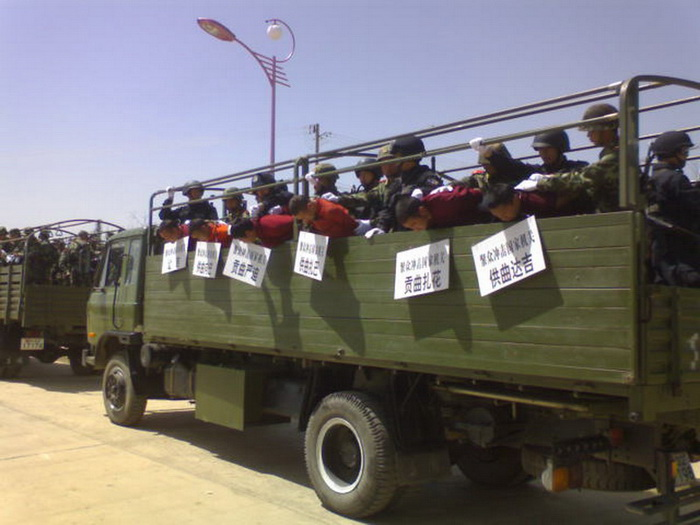
Arrested Monks and Lay Tibetans

Tibetan writer Shogdung, in his book The Division of Heaven and Earth, condemned the Chinese authorities for "hunting [Tibetans] down like innocent wild animals, like pigs, yaks, and sheep slaughtered in a slaughterhouse and scattered like a heap of peas," turning Tibet into "a 21st-century place of terror."

=== Surveillance ===
Since the late 1990s, the Chinese Communist Party has reportedly formalized its surveillance of Tibetan Buddhism. According to a 2025 report, the Tibet Autonomous Region had approximately 1,700 officially registered monasteries and around 46,000 monks and nuns for the effort.

=== Abduction and severe detention ===
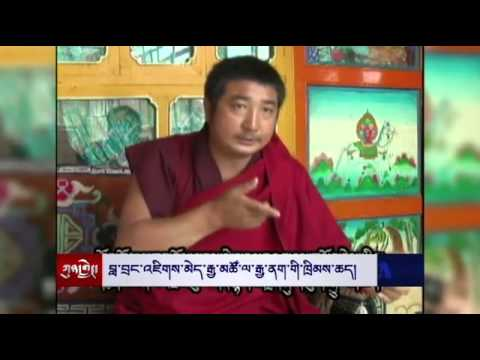
Labrang Jigme Gyatso

In March 2008, Labrang Jigme, a monk of Labrang Monastery, was abducted by security forces and endured six months of psychological torture while in detention. He commented in a video:

"A young soldier pointed an automatic rifle at me and said in Chinese, 'This is made to kill you, Ahlos [derogatory term used for Tibetans by some Chinese]. You make one move, and I will definitely shoot and kill you with this gun. I will throw your corpse in the trash and nobody will ever know.' This is the case of a powerful nationality harassing and oppressing a small nationality, a big nation making weapons to kill a small nationality; if they are doing such things at the lower levels, it goes without saying that they are doing worse things to us at higher levels. The way they oppress and murder Tibetans, and can utter such words while aiming guns [at us], stunned me. By telling us that Tibetans could be killed and our dead bodies dumped in the trash and that nobody would know - we are not even treated like dogs and pigs. If other people's dogs and pigs are killed, there will be somebody to claim them. Then why won't Tibetans be claimed after death? We are ordered not to claim our fellow Tibetans' bodies even after death. At that time, I realized that there is no racial equality."

== Impact ==
=== Economic upheaval ===
After losing control over their traditional lands and way of life, Tibetans have progressively been displaced in the local economy by Chinese settlers flooding into Tibet to capitalize on its heavily subsidized economic growth. This drastic shift in the demographic composition of the administrative and economic landscape forces Tibetans to adapt to the cultural dominance of this "new majority," often at the expense of their own identity and culture.

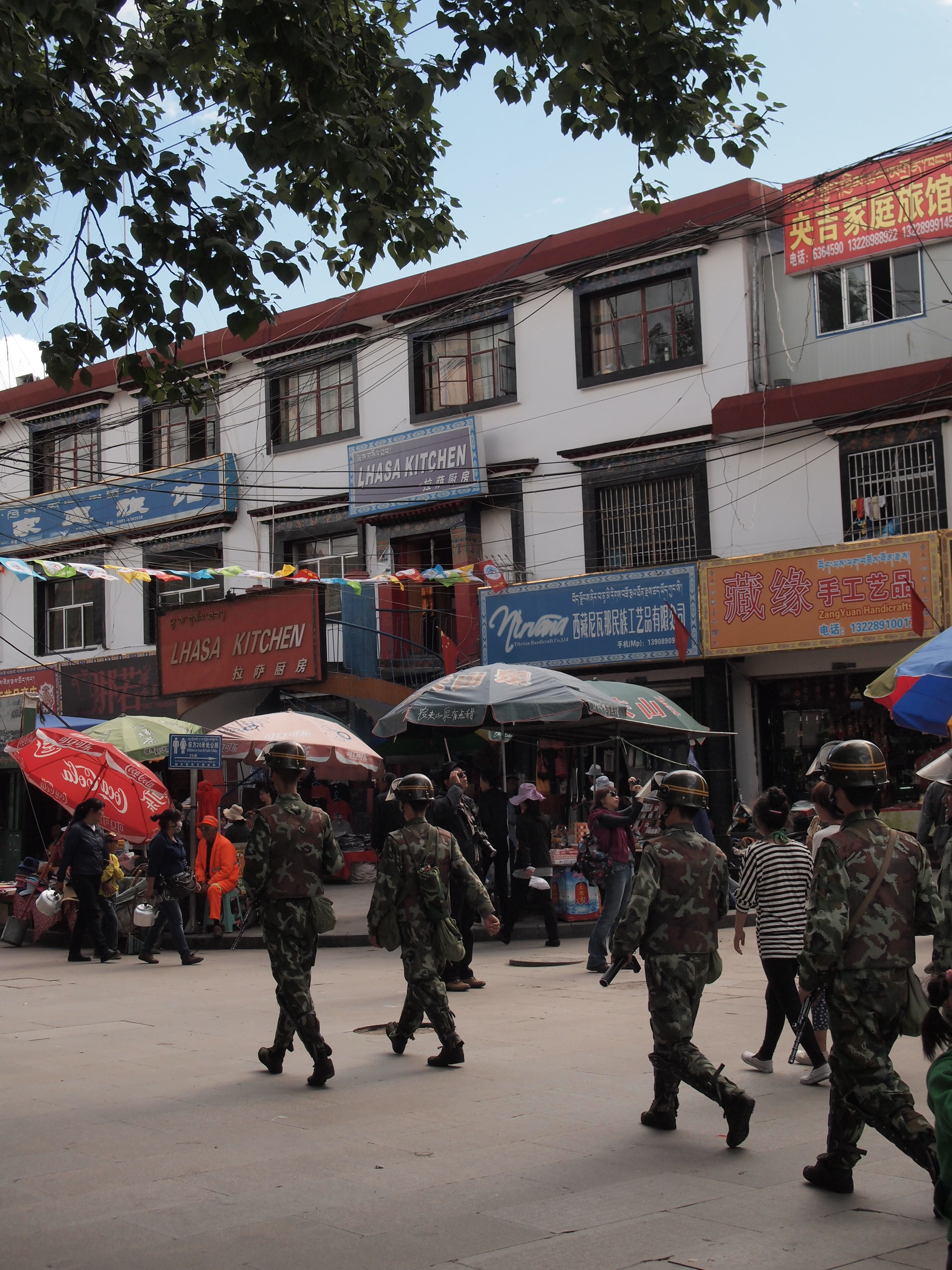
Restaurants in Lhasa with soldiers holding guns

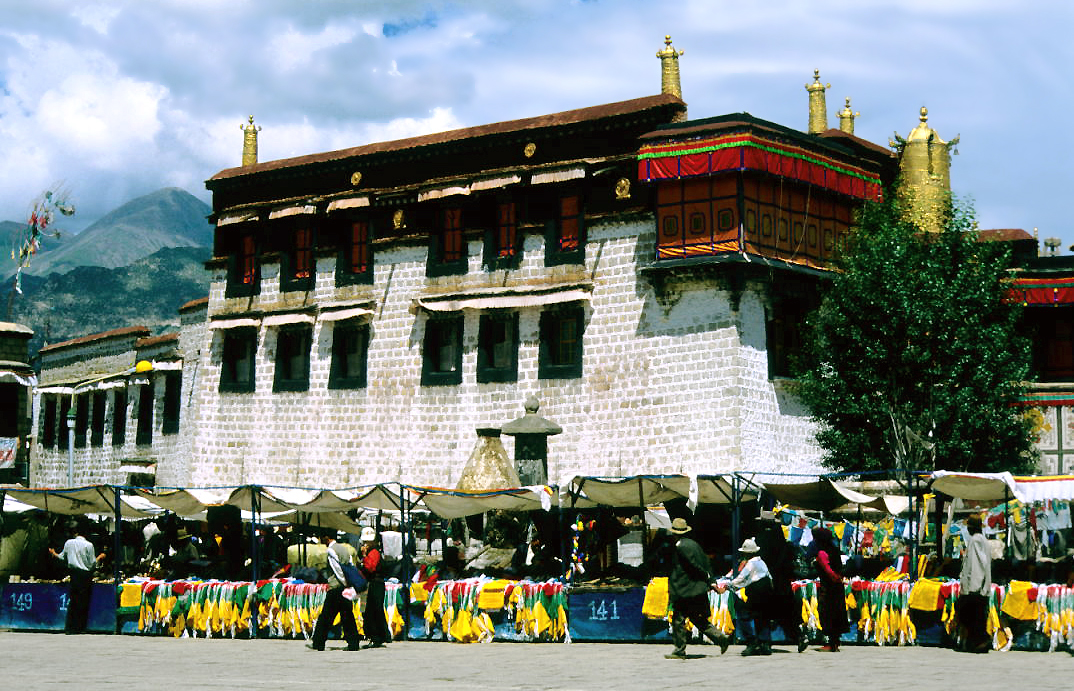
Jokhang Temple, Stalls Selling Khatas

With greater access to capital and other structural economic benefits, Chinese migrants have also been able to enter sectors traditionally dominated by Tibetans. In his essay Tibet through Chinese Eyes, American journalist Peter Hessler wrote:

"In Tibet, Sichuanese have helped themselves to a large chunk of the economy. This was clear from the moment I arrived at the Lhasa airport, where thirteen of the sixteen restaurants bordering the entrance advertised Sichuan food. One was Tibetan. Virtually all small business in Lhasa follows this pattern; everywhere I saw Sichuan restaurants and shops. Locals told that 80 percent of Lhasa's Han were Sichuanese... In front of the Jokhang, the holiest temple in Tibet, rows of stalls sell khataks, the ceremonial scarves that pilgrims use as offerings. It's a job one would expect to see filled by Tibetans [but] all the stalls were run by Sichuanese... There were more than 200 of them — relatives, friends of relatives, relatives of friends—and they had completely filled that niche."

Findings by a group of Chinese human rights lawyers on the March 2008 Tibetan protests suggested that a key driver of the anti-Chinese violence in Lhasa was the growing resentment among Tibetans. This frustration stemmed largely from the "relentless trend of growing disparities" between Tibetan and Han areas, as well as between urban and rural regions, amid the rapid processes of modernization and marketization.

=== Secularization ===
==== Lhasa and the Potala Palace ====
The historical capital of Tibet, Lhasa, the focus of adoration for millions of Tibetan Buddhists, and its magnificent Potala Palace were once a holy site and sacred place. However, it is now reduced to a mere museum and tourist attraction, raising concern about the disconnection between the Tibetan people, and their living heritage and cultural identity. In 1994, Lhasa still represented a unique and historical example of a traditional urban settlement in the Tibetan high-altitude plateau, but between 1995 and 2005, most of the historic and traditional buildings were demolished and reconstructed in a ‘Neo-Tibetan’ style to give way to modernity. In addition, the occupancy rate of Tibetans in building complexes has greatly reduced, as well as the monastic populations who live in them.

In 1994, the Potala Palace was granted world heritage status by UNESCO. As a result, this has brought national and international recognition to Tibetan culture and tradition. It has also attracted large numbers of tourists, traders and settlers to Lhasa, contributing to the economy of Tibet. However, fieldwork interviews suggest that Tibetan enterprises have declined from nearly 80% in 1995 to less than 30% in 2005 due to being replaced by Han Chinese. Confidential sources by Tibetan businessmen also indicate that as high as 90% of Han Chinese now control the businesses and production of goods. In addition, the government has favoured most Chinese by engaging them in the fields of traditional construction and heritage conversation for the world heritage sites (e.g., The Potala Palace, Jokhang Temple Monastery and Sakya Monastery) making Tibetans slowly losing the capacity to participate in their own cultural work since they are not fluent in Chinese in the first place. The Tibet Museum now features exhibits that are more skewed towards Chinese history, which means cultural diversity and continuity in Tibet are under threat.

==== Monks and monasteries ====
Monasteries and monks have shaped the Tibetan way of life for more than a thousand years, and it was estimated that at one point, 20% of the population was part of the monastic community. However, many of the older monks with knowledge in Tibetan Buddhism are either dead, imprisoned or in exile today. Field work interviews in Tibet suggested that higher monastic education has been unavailable in Tibet for a few decades, resulting in less educated younger monks. Traditionally, it takes 20 years for the monastic curriculum to be completed. Buddhist monks now tend to operate more as janitors and tourist guides rather than members of the Buddhist community. Proficiency in Tibetan language is also slipping due to limited Tibetan being taught in schools. Tibetans who are not proficient in Chinese also face difficulties in securing jobs, and some seek informal employment, such as selling ‘holy objects’ in streets, often involving the police as well. Entrance to religious buildings, though permitted, but is somehow restricted as compared to tourists. Moreover, public service employees in Lhasa are forbidden to take part in religious practices or visit sacred sites though China's constitution has granted its citizens full access to religion. If all these fieldwork interviews are deemed to be true, it sends an important message – that is the violation of human rights to education, jobs, and cultural practices.

== International reaction ==
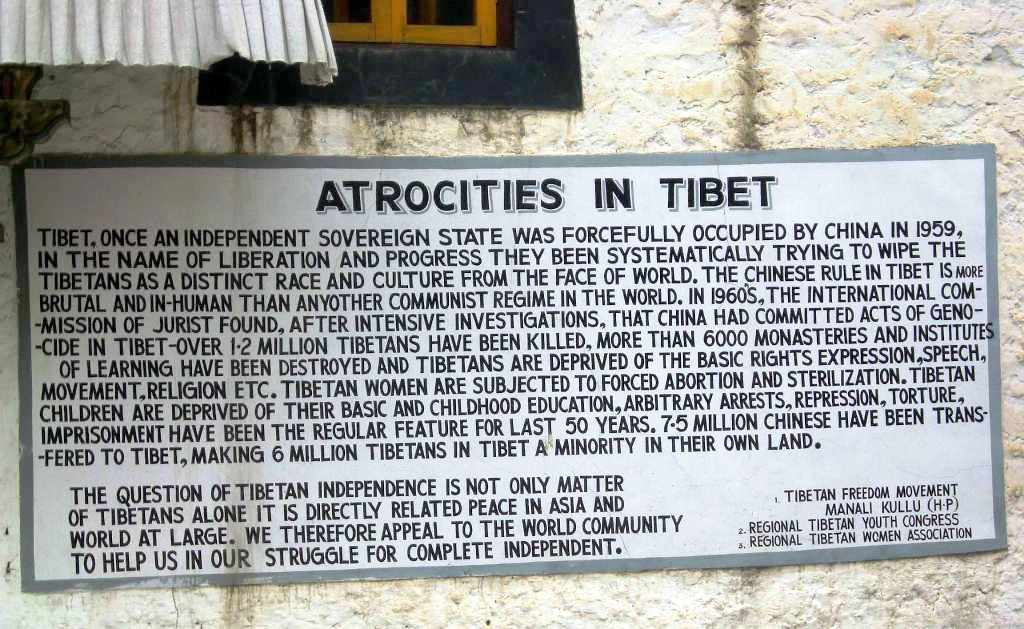
Tibetan Human Rights Sign at VON NGARI Monastery, Manali

A 1960 report by the International Commission of Jurists concluded that "acts of genocide had been committed in Tibet in an attempt to eliminate Tibetans as a religious group."

Groups advocating for Tibet have stated that the actions of the Chinese government violate both China's constitutional promises of religious freedom under Article 18, and minority rights under Article 27 of the International Covenant on Civil and Political Rights (ICCPR), which China has signed but not ratified.

Groups such as the International Campaign for Tibet have criticized Chinese policies towards Tibetan people and culture, calling on the Chinese government to end systematic violations against Tibetan culture and identity. Recommendations have also been made to the United Nations and the international community to intensify efforts to monitor the situation, advocate for Tibetan rights, and ensure accountability for these actions.

=== United Nations ===
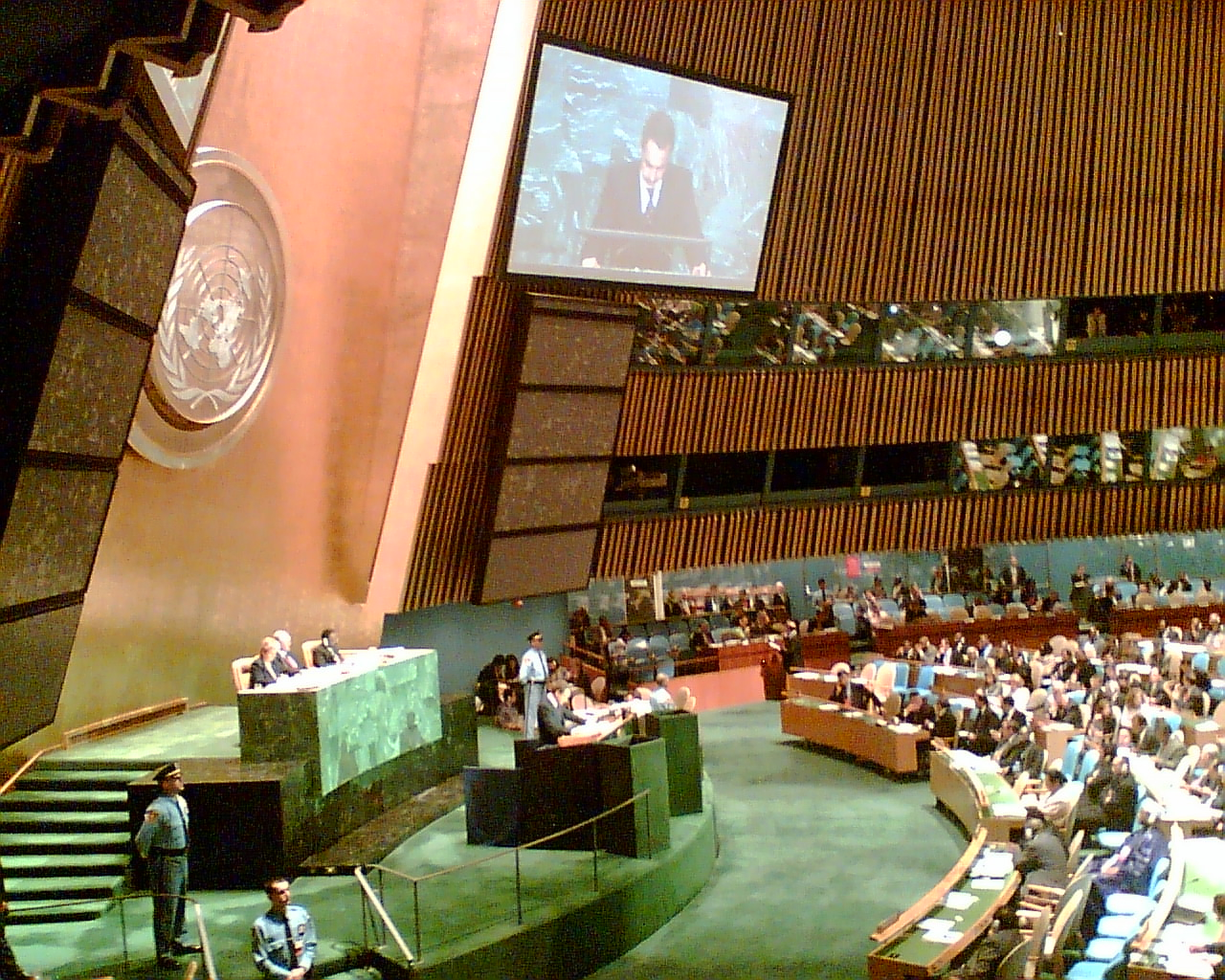
General Assembly of the United Nations

These breaches have been repeatedly condemned by UN bodies, such as the Committee on the Elimination of Racial Discrimination, the Committee on the Rights of the Child, and various special mechanisms of the UN Human Rights Council.

China has consistently dismissed calls from UN Special Rapporteurs on Education, Cultural Rights, and Racism to respect the linguistic rights of the Tibetan people.

== See also ==
- John Powers (academic), an Australian scholar who has an interest in Tibetan Buddhism and its suppression
