= Chinese settlements in Tibet =

Chinese colonies in Tibet

Since the 1980s, an increasing number of Han Chinese have migrated to or settled in Tibet, incentivized by Chinese government's development policies, major infrastructure projects, and initiatives to fortify areas close to the country's disputed border with India, as well as other economic and lifestyle opportunities. This has caused resentment among local residents. Various academics and Tibetan independence groups have also described the influx as a form of sinicization and settler colonialism.

== Background ==
The southeastern Tibetan region of Kham experienced multiple waves of migration from China proper since the Ming dynasty, beginning with the Nakhi and Yi peoples of Yunnan and later including Han settlers.

Tibet came under the control of the Qing dynasty in the 18th century. It gained de facto independence after China's 1911 Revolution. During this period, the Tibetan government (Kashag) began to expel ethnic Chinese from Tibet. This included the complete expulsion by the Tibetan Army of all Han Chinese from Lhasa on 8 July 1949 at the insistence of the British Mission in Lhasa.

The People's Republic of China (PRC) annexed Central Tibet between 1950 and 1951. After the Dalai Lama's escape from China in 1959, the PRC established the Tibet Autonomous Region in 1965.

== Later migration patterns ==
In the 1980s the Tibet Autonomous Regional Committee of the Chinese Communist Party initiated the Cadre Transfer Policy that sent party personnel into Tibet. Later government policies to develop Tibet economically attracted migrant workers from the neighboring Sichuan province, dwarfing the number of CCP cadres. They often had to leave their children behind still registered in their home districts. In the late 1990s, the Chinese government began incentivizing migration from eastern parts of the country to Tibet as part of Jiang Zemin's China Western Development campaign. Xi Jinping's Belt and Road Initiative further developed the country's western regions with major infrastructure projects such as the Medog Hydropower Station and the Trans-Himalayan Multi-dimensional Connectivity Network running through Tibet and Nepal.

Some recent migrants are more accurately described as drifters because they feel alienated in their home provinces but are not attached enough to stay in Tibet permanently. They are attracted to a less modern, slower-paced lifestyle but still need to work for a living, setting them apart from more affluent lifestyle migrants.

=== Statistics ===
In 1999, Lobsang Sangay, a leader of the Tibetan Youth Congress, stated in the Harvard Asia Quarterly that 60-70% of the population in Lhasa now is Chinese and, outside of the traditional Tibetan "Barkhor" market, Tibetans own only 400-450 of the 3,500 to 4,000 shops. Han Chinese also occupy most government-related employment with 95 percent of official Chinese migrants employed in state owned enterprises.

The Office of Tibet asserts that the data is distorted by a lack of residence permits held by the migrant population. It also asserts that "militant occupation" consists of "at least a quarter million", focused in the city of Lhasa, and Tibetans in urban eastern areas are outnumbered at least 2 to 1, although there are very few Chinese in rural areas.

The 2020 census of China showed that the Han population increased to 12 percent in the Tibet Autonomous Region, concentrated around Lhasa and the border with India. Outside of the Tibet Autonomous Region, in areas of Amdo and Kham administered by Gansu, Sichuan and Qinghai, Han migration has reversed; coupled with the growth of Tibetan and Hui populations, the proportion of Han Chinese has sharply decreased in some of these areas. In addition, reporting of Han population in Tibet usually occurs in the summer months when the region experiences a swell of Han tourists.

=== Impact on local communities ===
The influx of Chinese migrant workers has caused resentment among Tibetans and longtime Han residents. Almost all small businesses, such as shops and restaurants, were opened and run by Sichuanese. They also tend to have a larger guanxi network to government and business resources outside Tibet.

There are concerns that the influx of Chinese construction workers for the Medog Hydropower Station may displace local populations, such as Lhoba and Monpa peoples.

== Motives ==
In 1991 the Dalai Lama stated that new settlers have created "a Chinese apartheid which, denying Tibetans equal social and economic status in our own land, threatens to finally overwhelm and absorb us."

In the 1980s, Chinese migrants were incentivized with major personal economic benefits. Publications report salary increases averaging at 71.8% of the migrant's previous salary. Monthly allowances are also provided, the amount fluctuating according to the migrant's residence "hardship level". Children of the Chinese Communist Party's Cadre Transfer Policy migrants are given priority job assignments. According to Yasheng Huang, the Cadre Transfer Policy in the 1980s was not an assimilation attempt because the number of Chinese migrants was minimal compared to other periods; instead it was an attempt to promote economic development of the newly annexed region. The people that desired jobs were sent to the area in "low quantity but high quality".

After China enacted policies to develop Tibet economically, a wave of migrant workers left neighboring Sichuan due to overpopulation and poverty. They wanted to find employment in Tibet and return after making enough money.

Since 2016, under the general secretaryship of Xi Jinping, the Chinese government has sought to augment its control over areas near the disputed Sino-Indian border by paying individuals to relocate to newly built dual-use villages near the Line of Actual Control and conduct border patrols. The government calls them "border guardians", which include Tibetans.

== See also ==
- Annexation of Tibet by the People's Republic of China
- Han chauvinism
- Sinicization of Tibet
