= The Pulse (TV programme) =

Hong Kong weekly current affairs television program

- Title card in 2020.
- Genre: Current affairs
- Presented by: Stephen Vines
- Original language: English

Production
- Executive producer: Diana Wan
- Running time: 21–22 minutes
- Production company: RTHK

Original release
- Network: RTHK TV 31
- Release: 7 January 2005 – 2 July 2021

The Pulse was a Hong Kong weekly current affairs television program produced by RTHK that airs on RTHK TV 31, which provided in-depth reports and interviews on current issues in Hong Kong, mainland China and the rest of the world. Created by its first executive producer Gary Pollard, the series broadcast its first episode on January 7, 2005. The programme was hosted by Stephen Vines, a British writer and journalist.

The show originally aired on both TVB Pearl and RTHK TV 31, it ceased its broadcast on TVB in 2017 and on RTHK in 2021.

== Incidents ==
=== Bruce Aylward interview ===
On 28 March 2020, during the COVID-19 pandemic, Bruce Aylward, senior advisor to the Director General of World Health Organization (WHO), was interviewed in The Pulse by Yvonne Tong. In the video interview, Tong asked Aylward about Taiwan's status in the WHO and inquired as to whether it might be readmitted to the WHO after being denied entry by Beijing. However, Aylward claimed not to hear the question, and then terminated the video call.

Tong then called once again to pose questions about Taiwan and its handling of COVID-19. Aylward responded by following China's official position that Taiwan is indeed part of China, a politically charged claim. “Well, we’ve already talked about China. And when you look across all the different areas of China, they’ve actually all done quite a good job,” he responded. He then quickly ended the interview.

The interview went viral across social media and raised questions about the WHO's deference to China in shutting out Taiwanese representation. As RTHK is a public broadcaster funded by the Hong Kong government, the secretary for commerce and economic development Edward Yau reprimanded the station for breaching its charter which includes "promoting understanding of the one country, two systems model". Yau and pro-government figures like Junius Ho opined that the interview violated the One China principle. RTHK announced it stood by the original interview as aired, dismissed claims that it violated the charter as it did not mention Taiwan as a country, and pushed back against government interference in the station's editorial autonomy. An RTHK advisory panel member labeled the accusations as “nonsense”, adding that she does not "understand why when a reporter is asking something relating to health, she or he has to remember there is ‘One Country, Two Systems’ … in line with the government or China”. A WHO representative sent a e-mail statement to Hong Kong Free Press accusing the show's crew of misrepresentation and deliberate manipulation of footage; but RTHK's Head of Corporate Communications and Standards Amen Ng however rebukes this stating that the broadcaster “strenuously reject any allegations of ‘distortion and misrepresentation.'”
