= The Points (website) =

Hong Kong news website

- Type: Online-only news
- Founder(s): Finn Lau; Mark Clifford; Louisa Lim; Steve Vines; Joe Tay; Samuel Bickett
- Editor-in-chief: Jane Poon
- Founded: January 2023; 2 years ago
- Political alignment: Pro-democracy
- Language: Chinese
- Website: https://points-media.com/

The Points (Chinese: 棱角媒體), also known as Points Media, is a Hong Kong news website established in 2023. Founded by former journalists of pro-democratic media outlets following the 2019–2020 Hong Kong protests, it operates with multiple stations worldwide to provide 24-hour international news coverage.

== History ==
The Points was established in January 2023 by media professionals who migrated outside of Hong Kong, including ex-journalists from Apple Daily, a pro-democratic outlet shut down after the 2019–2020 Hong Kong protests, as well as those from Stand News, RTHK, Cable News, and Next Magazine. Its name was derived from the motto "to seek truth in troubled times and make clear all points [of view]". Australia-based independent journalist and former head of Next Magazine Jane Poon serves as The Points' chief editor, while political activist Finn Lau serves as the executive director. The outlet's advisory board includes former South China Morning Post chief editor Mark Clifford, journalists Louisa Lim, Steve Vines, politician Joe Tay, and human rights lawyer Samuel Bickett. Founding critics announced alongside the establishment include ex-legislator Ted Hui, politician Michael Ngan, historian Hans Yeung, political cartoonist Badiucao, and human rights activist Benedict Rogers. Lau mentioned that the outlet prepared for its launch for 15 months, aiming to fill the information gap left by the shutdown of pro-democratic media outlets like Apple Daily, Stand News, and Citizen News, but it faced multiple challenges, including a lack of funding and unexplained suspensions of its Twitter account. The Points had six full-time journalists and a group of stringers stationed worldwide, including in Taiwan, Australia, the United States, Canada, and the United Kingdom, working in shifts to report on international news from the perspective of Hongkongers and provide 24-hour coverage. Poon mentioned that one reason for founding The Points was to unite media professionals in the Hong Kong diaspora to protect freedom of speech and expression without local censorship concerns. She also observed that the diaspora often lacks a platform to express opinions and receive information amidst rising misinformation on social media.

On 9 February 2023, The Points published a story about the death of ex-legislator Albert Chan, which was later revealed to be mistaken for another political activist Ed Lau (both of whom share the Chinese nickname "Big Piece"). The Points retracted the story and issued an apology the same day, but faced criticism regarding its journalistic ethics, with ex-district councilor Clarisse Yeung denouncing The Points for "rubbing salt in the wounds of the deceased". Poon stated that the outlet revised its workflow immediately after the incident in an interview with Voice of America. She explained that due to uneven staffing during shifts, only articles from Australia, the United Kingdom, and Canada were reviewed before publishing, while pieces from other regions were not, and they enhanced their editorial process by reallocating staff from other shifts to help supervise those with insufficient labor despite geographical challenges. The same month, The Points released stories covering the criticisms and opinions of Hong Kong Canadians regarding the Hong Kong Pathways, and exposing Kim Chan, the former assistant to pro-democratic legal scholar Benny Tai, as a suspected spy attempting to get close to Tai. As of March 2023, the outlet has garnered about 46,000 followers on Facebook and 28,000 followers on Instagram. In September, The Points requested a public donation of HKD$270,000 to maintain operations. Poon noted that while being based overseas allows them to avoid issues with the National Security Laws, it has deterred subscribers, leading to a lack of funds.
