= Steve Vines =

British-Hong Kong journalist and writer

Stephen Vines
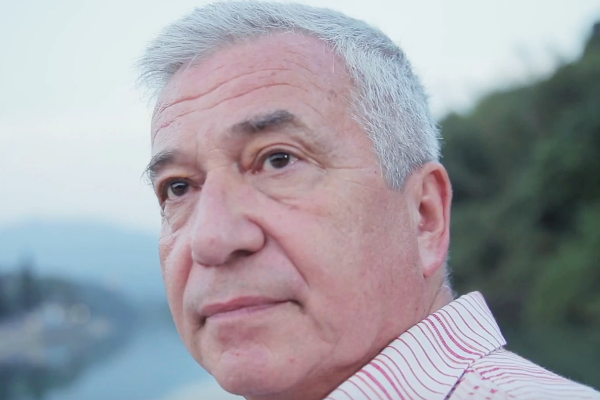
- Born: 1949 or 1950 (age 75–76)
- Political party: Civic Party

Chinese name
- Traditional Chinese: 韋安仕
Transcriptions
Yue: Cantonese
- Jyutping: wai5 ngon1 si6
- Website: stephenvines-author.com

Stephen Vines is a British journalist, writer, broadcaster and restaurateur, who was based in Hong Kong from 1987 to 2021.

== Career ==
Vines first moved to Hong Kong in 1987 as a south-east Asia correspondent for The Observer, with the intent of staying for a few years. He then went on to work as a correspondent for the BBC, The Daily Telegraph, The Guardian, The Independent and Asia Times. Vines was the founding editor of Eastern Express, and the founder and publisher of Spike, a political and business weekly magazine. Both the Eastern Express and Spike failed shortly after their launch. He was involved with the start-up of Hong Kong Free Press. He once served as the president of the Foreign Correspondents' Club.

Vines also hosted The Pulse, a current affairs TV programme on RTHK. The programme was terminated in July 2021 amid a shakedown at the "embattled" public broadcaster.

Apart from journalism, he operated companies in the food and beverage sector. He was also a founding member of the Civic Party.

== Political views ==
=== Criticism of the central Chinese and Hong Kong governments ===
Vines has been a repeated critic of both the Chinese Central Government and the Chinese government of Hong Kong ever since the handover. Already in 1997, Vines compared the handling of the media by the government of Hong Kong's first Chief Executive Tung Chee-Hwa unfavorably to Hong Kong's last British governor Chris Patten, whom he called "very media-savvy and media-friendly." Vines described Tung's administration as "staggeringly incompetent." More recently, he has again compared the years before the handover under colonial rule favorably to the post-1997 period. He has generally criticized Hong Kong's Chief Executives as supposedly being too loyal to the Chinese central government, for example describing the administration of Carrie Lam as "quislings." He has lamented that "[a]fter the handover there was a frenzy of tearing down structural reminders of British colonial rule" and claims that the Chinese central government has repeatedly "undermined" Hong Kong's autonomy since 1997.

== Departure from Hong Kong ==
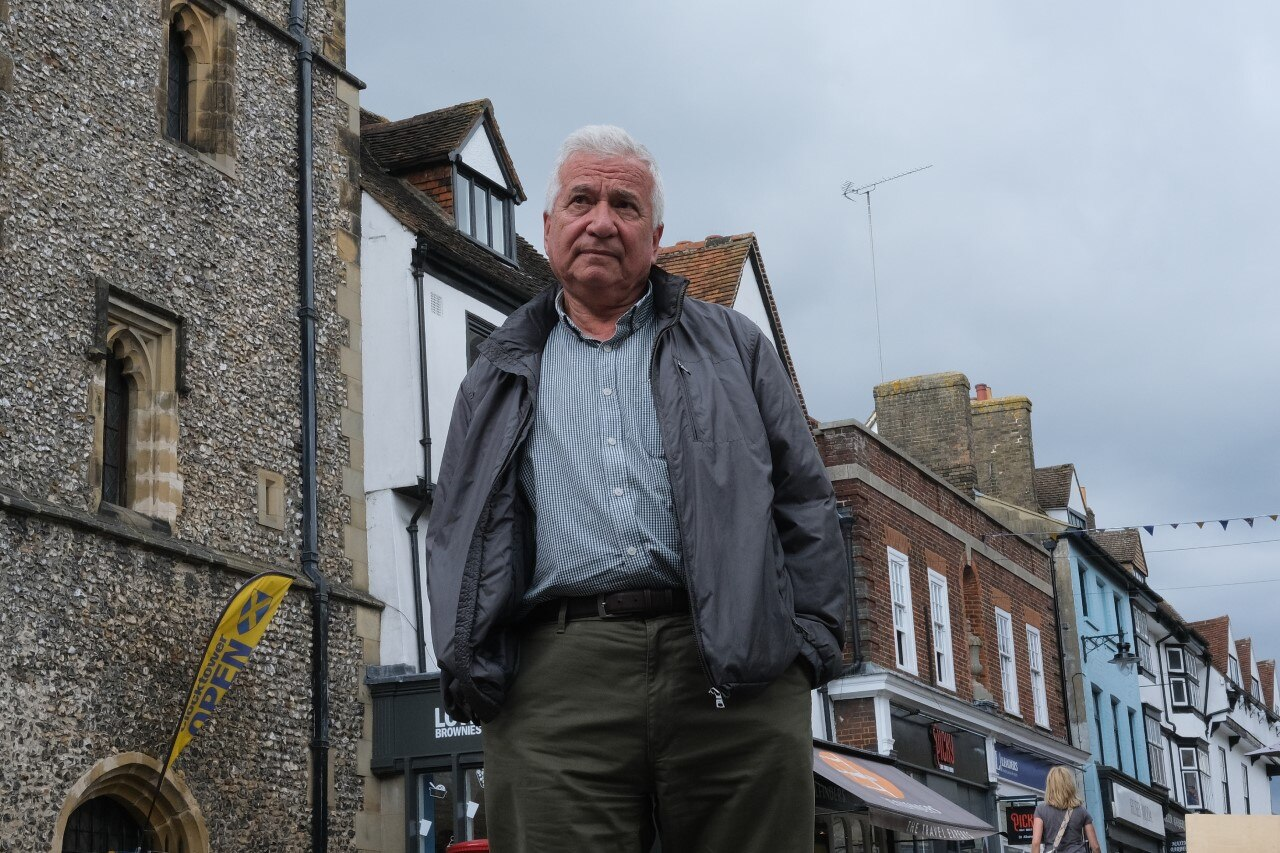
Vines in St. Albans, England, 2021

In August 2021, Vines announced he left Hong Kong for the UK in fear of "white terror" under the Hong Kong national security law. In an email to his friends and colleagues, he wrote, "[t]he white terror sweeping through Hong Kong is far from over and the near-term prospects of things getting better are simply non-existent". He told the Financial Times that he had been targeted by pro-Beijing people. He said, "[t]hey have this band of people who are not officially sanctioned... who go around threatening anybody who has, so called, stepped out of line. Unfortunately, I was one of those. [The person] said quite aggressively... 'you better watch your step, we are coming for you.'" Reflecting in Hong Kong Free Press on his departure, Vines wrote that "loving Hong Kong has become a suspect activity".

Vines, along with several other former Hong Kong residents, ultimately settled in the English town of St. Albans.

== Bibliography ==
- Defying the Dragon: Hong Kong and the World's Largest Dictatorship. London: Hurst. 2021. ISBN 9781787384552.
- Food Gurus: 20 People who Changed the Way We Eat and Think About Food. Singapore: Marshall Cavendish. 2012. ISBN 9789814361071.
- Sai Kung for All Seasons. Hong Kong: FormAsia. 2012. ISBN 9789881556257.
- Market Panic: Wild Gyrations, Risks and Opportunities in Stock Markets. Wiley. 2003. ISBN 9780470821527.
- The Years of Living Dangerously: Asia – From Financial Crisis to the New Millennium. London: Orion Business. 2000. ISBN 9780752820729.
- Hong Kong: China's New Colony. London: Aurum Press. 1998. ISBN 9781854105790.
