= Jamyang Kyi =

Tibetan singer, journalist, and television broadcaster (born 1965)

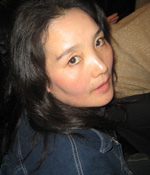
Jamyang Kyi (2008)

Jamyang Kyi is a noted Tibetan singer, feminist and writer, journalist, and a prominent television broadcaster. She was born in 1965 in Amdo, northeastern region of Tibet.

== Early life ==
Jamyang Kyi was born in 1965 in Amdo, traditional province of northeast Tibet. She is originating from a Tibetan rural family of the prefecture of Tsolho, or Hainan Prefecture. She lives in the city of Xining, and is married and has two daughters, the elder, 17 years old, attending schooling in Beijing and the younger, 5 years, living in Xining.

== Singing career ==
Tibetan Singer, she composes herself the songs that she interprets. Since the 90’, she recorded several albums of which "Prayer", "Karma" and "distant Lover". Jamyang Kyi became very popular in Tibet since her album "heart Message" in 1997. The music of Jamyang Kyi is influenced by the modern folk music and traditional of different regions of Tibet.

== A journalist, writer, television presenter ==
Jamyang Kyi is also a journalist of television, and a writer. She has presented programs in Tibetan of state-run television station in Qinghai during more than 20 years. Since 2005, she composed essays on the fate of Tibetan women. She published articles including one on the illegal dealings in girls (Qinghai Daily, edition in Tibetan language, 11/30/05) and the statute of women in the Tibetan society. She described in particular the existence of forced marriages.

She also published articles on the education and inter-ethniques relations. After her trip to the United States in 2006, she also was very interested in the protection of the culture and to the equality between men and women, and published texts on these subjects on her blog.

She wrote a book in Tibetan on Tibetan women fate and the preservation of the Tibetan culture, "Fortunes and misfortunes of the women – Snows and mixed rains" that should have appeared in 2007 to the Editions of the nationalities of the Gansu. Feminist, one can suppose that she has been influenced by reading The Second Sex of Simone de Beauvoir translated in Chinese.

== Arrest in Tibet ==
In the context of the 2008 Tibetan unrest, Jamyang Kyi was arrested April 1, 2008 by the Chinese police on her work place, to the chain of State Qinghai Television suggesting that the Chinese government crackdown after the unrest in and around Tibet is continuing

Khawa Karpo-Tibet Culture Centre, a Tibetan association based in exile in India, confirmed the arrest of Jamyang Kyi. She was released on May 20, 2008.

According to Radio Free Asia, Jamyang Kyi could have been questioned about a trip to the United States in March 2006 in New York where she produced herself with of other Tibetan artists. Policemen came at her residence to seize documents and her computer. Reporters without borders launched April 17 a call to the European Union and requests the immediate release of Jamyang Kyi.

She was released May 20, 2008, but she is awaiting trial.

== See also ==
- Political prisoner
