= Phayul.com =

Tibetan news website based in India

- Website type: News website
- Available in: English
- Headquarters: New Delhi, {{{location_country}}}
- Editor: Sherab Woeser
- Website: phayul.com
- Launched: 2001; 25 years ago

Phayul.com, also known as Fatherland in Tibetan, is an English language news portal that publishes news and opinion about Tibet and Tibet-in-exile. It was created in 2001 by Tibetan exiles in India operates from Dharamsala. The site also includes book reviews, stories, essays, and a discussion forum. Its director is Tenzin Norsang Lateng and the editor is Kalsang Rinchen.
