= Robert Barnett (scholar) =

British-American Tibetologist

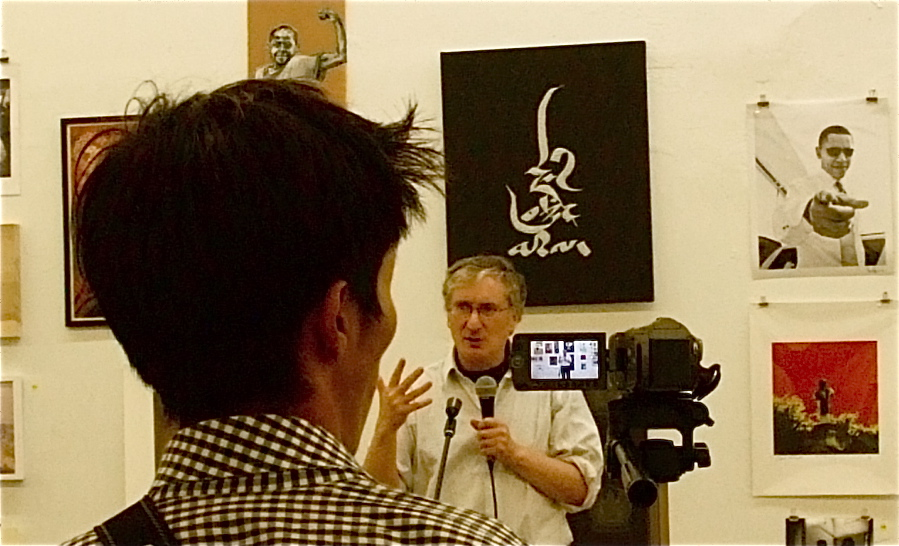
Robbie Barnett

Robert Barnett (born 1953) is a Professorial Research Associate at SOAS (School of Oriental and African Studies), University of London and Affiliate Lecturer and Research Affiliate at the Lau China Institute, King's College, London. He is the former Director of the Modern Tibetan Studies Program, where he was Adjunct Professor of Contemporary Tibetan Studies and Senior Research Scholar in modern Tibetan history at the Weatherhead East Asian Institute at Columbia University. He retired from Columbia as of January 2018. He is also referred to as Robbie Barnett by the media.

== Biography ==
Robert Barnett founded and directed Columbia's Modern Tibetan Studies Program, the first Western teaching program in the field, until December 2017. His most recent books are Conflicting Memories: Tibetan History under Mao Retold, co-edited with Benno Weiner and Françoise Robin (Brill Publishers, 2020) Tibetan Modernities: Notes from the Field, with Ronald Schwartz (Brill Publishers, 2008) and Lhasa: Streets with Memories (Columbia University Press, 2006). Barnett has also written articles about modern Tibetan history, post-1950 leaders in Tibet, Tibetan cinema and television, women and politics in Tibet, and contemporary exorcism rituals. At Columbia, he taught courses on Tibetan film and television, contemporary culture, history, oral history, and other subjects. From 2000 to 2006 he ran the annual summer program for foreign students at Tibet University in Lhasa and has taught courses at Princeton and Inalco (Paris). He is a frequent commentator about Tibet and about nationality issues in China for the BBC, CNN, NPR, CBS, The New York Times, the Washington Post, The New York Review of Books, and other media. Barnett directed 15 educational projects in Tibet, including training programs in ecotourism and conservation. Prior to joining the Columbia faculty in 1998, Barnett worked as a researcher and journalist based in the United Kingdom, specializing in Tibetan issues for the BBC, the South China Morning Post, VOA, and other media outlets.

In 1987, Barnett, with Nicholas Howen, co-founded the Tibet Information Network (TIN), an independent London-based research organization covering events in Tibet, of which he was the director until 1998.

== Selected publications ==
- Barnett, Robert, ed. (1994). Resistance and Reform in Tibet. Bloomington: Indiana University Press
- Barnett, Robert (2006). Lhasa: Streets with Memories. New York: Columbia University Press.
- Barnett, Robert and Ronald Schwartz, eds. (2008). Tibetan Modernities: Notes from the Field. Leiden: Brill Publishers.
- Tsering Woeser (2020). Forbidden Memory: Tibet in the Cultural Revolution. Edited and introduced by Robert Barnett. Lincoln: University of Nebraska Press.
- Barnett, Robert, Benno Weiner and Françoise Robin, eds. (2020). Conflicting Memories: Tibetan History under Mao Retold. Leiden: Brill Publishers.

== Affiliations ==
- Modern Tibetan Studies Program at Columbia University
- Weatherhead East Asian Institute at Columbia University
- Columbia University
- SOAS University of London
- King's College London
