= Index of Tibet-related articles =

This is a list of topics related to Tibet.

Those interested in the subject can monitor changes to the pages by clicking on Related changes in the sidebar.

== 0–9 ==
- 16-Article Code
- 70,000 Character Petition

== A ==
- Amban
- Amdo
- Annexation of Tibet by the People's Republic of China
- Araniko
- Architecture of Tibet
- Arunachal Pradesh

== B ==
- Balti people
- Battle of Chamdo
- Battle of the Salween River
- Bhrikuti
- Bhutan
- British expedition to Tibet
- Bon
- Bureau of Buddhist and Tibetan Affairs
- Butter tea
- Bell, Sir Charles Alfred

== C ==
- Catholic Church in Tibet
- Central Tibetan Administration
- Charter of the Tibetans In-Exile
- Chhaang
- Chinese expedition to Tibet (1720)
- Chinese expedition to Tibet (1910)
- Chinese settlements in Tibet
- Chögyam Trungpa
- Chörten
- Cho Oyu
- Chowa, Tibet
- CIA Tibetan program
- Contemporary Tibetan art
- Cuisine of Tibet
- Cultural repression in Tibet
- China Tibet Online

== D ==
- Dalai Lama
- Alexandra David-Néel
- Dharamsala, Himachal Pradesh
- Dêqên Tibetan Autonomous Prefecture
- Dhvaja
- Tashi Dondrup
- Dongkha La
- Agvan Dorzhiev
- Dpon-chen
- Drepung Monastery
- Dzogchen

== E ==
- Economy of Tibet
- Education in Tibet
- Emblem of Tibet
- Epic of King Gesar

== F ==
- Fenghuoshan tunnel
- Flag of Tibet
- Foreign relations of Tibet
- Four harmonious animals
- Free Tibet Campaign
- Freedom in Exile

== G ==
- Ganden Phodrang
- Ganden Tripa
- Garpon
- Garzê Tibetan Autonomous Prefecture
- Gauri Sankar
- Gedhun Choekyi Nyima
- Gedun Drub
- Gendun Gyatso
- Geluk
- Geography of Tibet
- Geshe Kelsang Gyatso
- Ghosts in Tibetan culture
- Golden Urn
- Golmud
- Government of Tibet in Exile
- Güüshi Khan
- Gyachung Kang
- Gyaincain Norbu

== H ==
- Heinrich Harrer
- Himalayas
- Historical money of Tibet
- History of Tibet
- History of European exploration in Tibet
- Hoh Xil
- Hu Jintao
- Hu Yaobang
- Human rights in Tibet

== I ==
- Imperial Preceptor

== J ==
- Jampa Tsering
- Jamyang Kyi
- Jebtsundamba
- Je Tsongkhapa
- Jokhang
- Jonang

== K ==
- Kagyu
- Kalachakra
- Karmapa
- Kham
- Khoshuud

== L ==
- Ladakh
- Ladakhi language
- Lama
- Lhasa
- Lhasa Newar
- Lhazang Khan
- Lhoba
- List of rulers of Tibet
- List of Tibetan monasteries
- Losar
- Lobsang Gyatso

== M ==
- Makalu
- Melungtse
- Mekong
- Ming–Tibet relations
- Mongol conquest of Tibet
- Monpa people
- Mount Everest
- Music of Tibet
- Mustang (kingdom)

== N ==
- Nagqu
- Nangma
- National Democratic Party of Tibet
- Neolithic Tibet
- Nepalese Chamber of Commerce, Lhasa
- Ngari
- Ngawa Tibetan and Qiang Autonomous Prefecture
- Norbulingka
- Nyingchi Prefecture
- Nyingma

== O ==
- Om Mani Padme Hum
- Outline of Tibet

== P ==
- Paca, Tibet
- Padmasambhava
- Panchen Lama
- Pangong Tso
- Patron and priest relationship
- Pargo Kaling
- Pema Chodron
- Pearl Waterfall
- Phagmodrupa dynasty
- Phagspa
- Politics in Tibet
- Potala Palace
- Prostitution in Tibet

== Q ==
- Qamdo
- Qiangba Puncog
- Qinghai
- Qinghai-Tibet Railway

== R ==
- Religion in Tibet
- Raksi
- Ramoche Temple
- Rinpungpa
- Rongbuk Glacier

== S ==
- Sakya
- Saptakoshi River
- Sanga Monastery
- Seven Years in Tibet
- Seventeen Point Agreement for the Peaceful Liberation of Tibet
- Sherpa (people)
- Shigatse
- Shishapangma
- Singha Sartha Aju
- Sinicization of Tibet
- Sky burial
- Social classes of Tibet
- Songtsen Gampo
- Song–Tibet relations
- Sonam Gyatso
- South Tibet
- South Tibet Valley
- Snow Lion

== T ==
- Tangut
- Tang–Tibet relations
- Tasam
- Tenzin Gyatso
- The Art of Happiness
- Thenthuk
- Thokcha
- Thonmi Sambhota
- Tibet
- Tibet Autonomous Region
- Tibet Mirror
- Tibet under Qing rule
- Tibet under Yuan rule
- Tibet Vernacular Paper
- Tibetan alphabet
- Tibetan art
- Tibetan Book of the Dead
- Tibetan Buddhism
- Tibetan Buddhist canon
- Tibetan calendar
- Tibetan cheese
- Tibetan culture
- Tibetan diaspora
- Tibetan Empire
- Tibetan festivals
- Tibetan independence movement
- Tibetan languages
- Tibetan literature
- Tibetan Muslims
- Tibetan mythology
- Tibetan people
- Tibetan Plateau
- Tibetan prayer wheel
- Tibetan resistance movement
- Tibetan rug
- Tibetan skar
- Tibetan srang
- Tibetan tsakli
- Tibetan Uprising Day
- Tibetology
- Timeline of Tibetan history
- Traditional Tibetan medicine
- Treaty of friendship and alliance between the Government of Mongolia and Tibet
- Tsangpa
- Toeshey
- Tsozong

== U ==
- Ucan script
- Ü-Tsang

== W ==
- Princess Wencheng
- Western Xia
- Wylie transliteration

== X ==
- Xia Zayu
- Xikang
- Xining

== Y ==
- Yabshi Pan Rinzinwangmo
- Yamdrok Lake
- Yangbajing tunnel
- Yang Chuantang
- Yungchen Lhamo

== Z ==
- Zaya Pandita
- Zhang Zhung culture
