= Outline of Tibet =

Plateau region in Asia

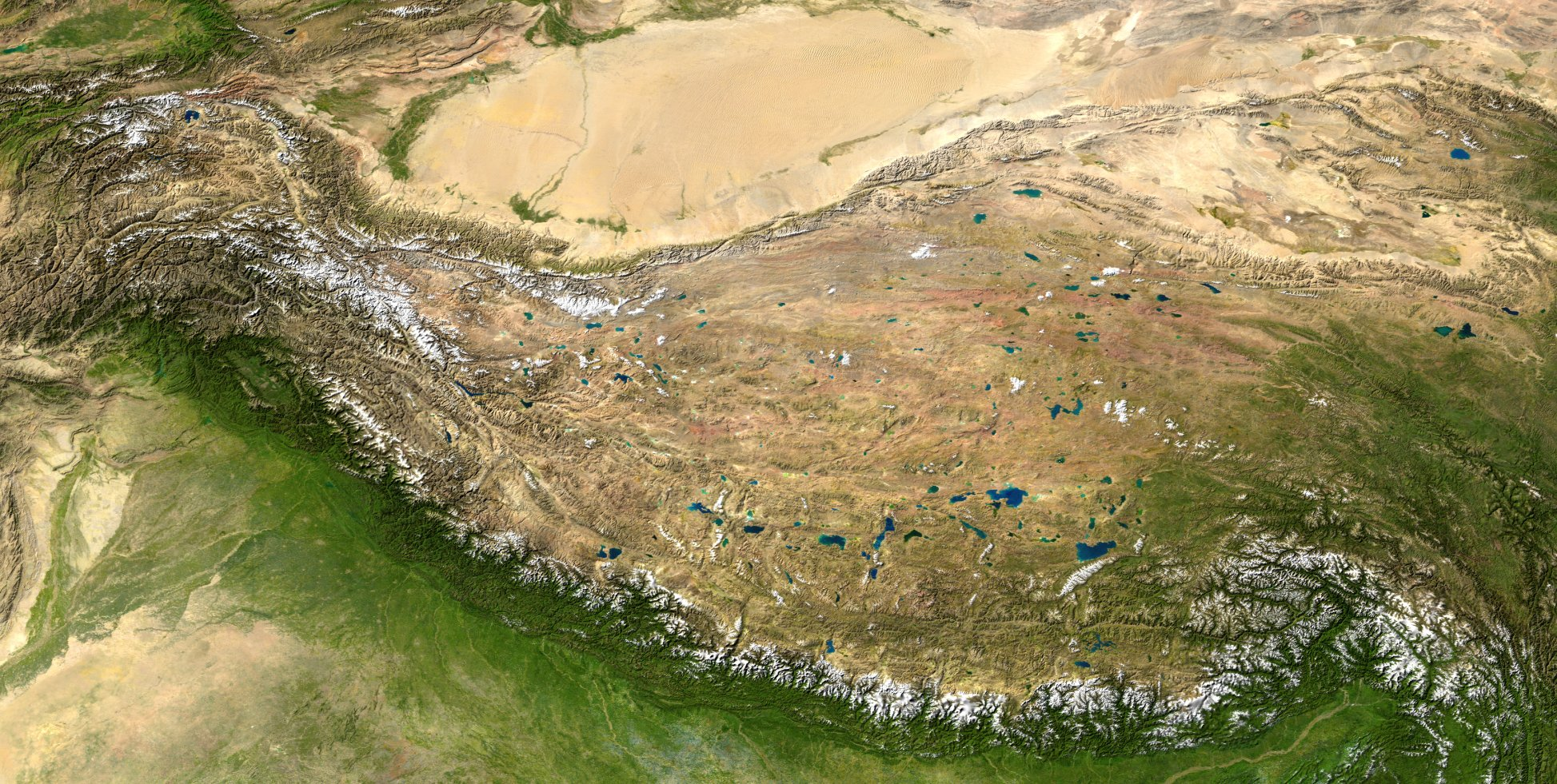
A satellite image of Tibet/Xizang

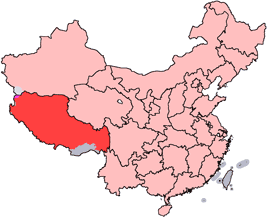
Political map; Tibet Autonomous Region within China

The following outline is provided as an overview of and topical guide to Tibet:

Tibet is a plateau region in Asia and the home to the indigenous Tibetan people. With an average elevation of 4,900 metres (16,000 ft), it is the highest region on Earth and is commonly referred to as the "Roof of the World."

A unified Tibet first came into being under Songtsen Gampo in the 7th century. From the early 17th century until the 1959 uprising, the Dalai Lamas (Tibetan Buddhist spiritual leaders) were, at least nominally, heads of a centralised Tibetan administration, with political power to administer religious and administrative authority over large parts of Tibet from the traditional capital Lhasa. They are believed to be the emanations of Avalokiteśvara (or "Chenrezig" [spyan ras gzigs] in Tibetan), the bodhisattva of compassion.

== General reference ==
- Pronunciation: /tɪˈbɛt/, Tibetan pronunciation: [pʰøːʔ˨˧˩]
- Common English names: Tibet; or Xizang
- Official English names: Xizang Autonomous Region of the People's Republic of China
- Common endonym(s):
- Official endonym(s):
- Adjectival(s): Tibetan
- Demonym(s): Tibetans
- Etymology: Name of Tibet
- ISO region code for Xizang: CN-54

== Geography of Tibet ==
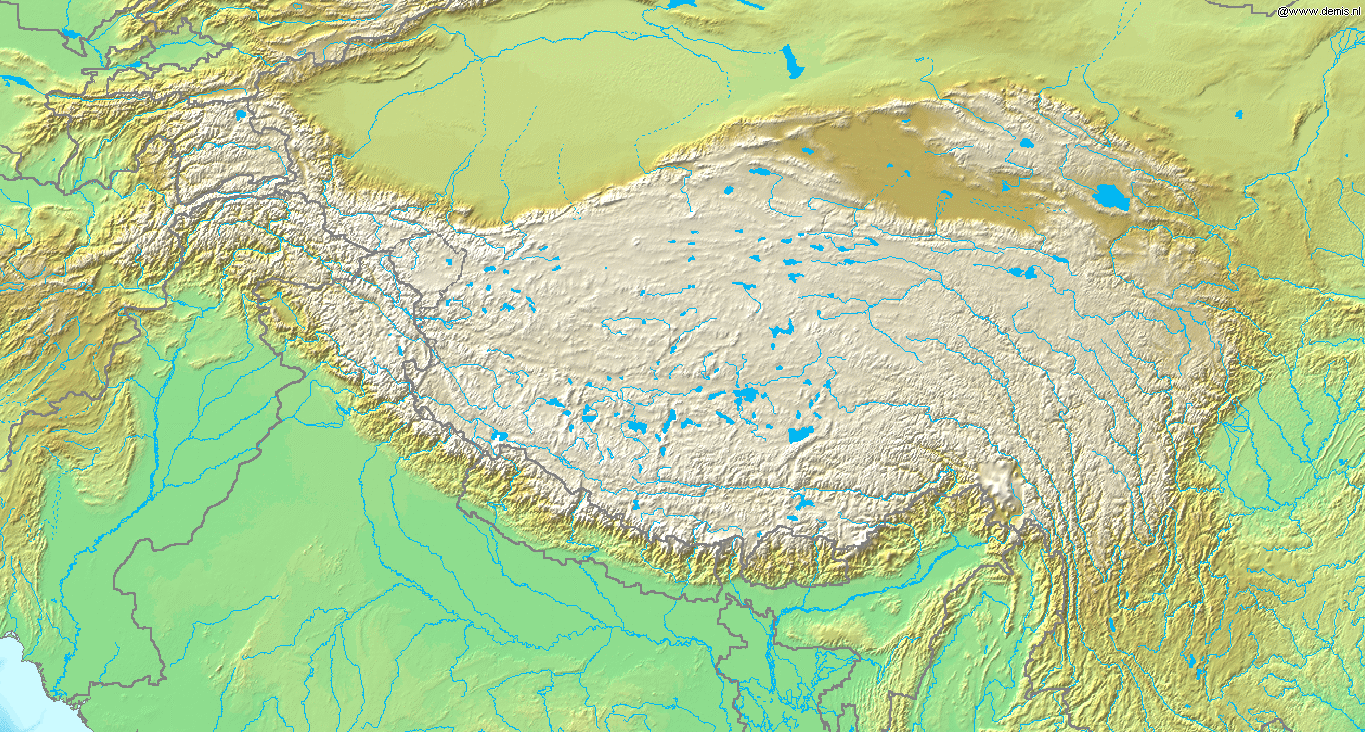
A topographic map of Tibet

Geography of Tibet

- Location:
  - Northern Hemisphere and Eastern Hemisphere
  - Eurasia
    - Asia
      - Central Asia
      - South Asia
      - East Asia
  - Time zone: China Standard Time (UTC+08)
  - Extreme points of Tibet
    - High: Mount Everest 8,848 m (29,029 ft) – highest point on Earth
    - Low: Yarlung Tsangpo 1,615 m (5,299 ft)
- Demographics of Tibet
- Atlas of Tibet

=== Environment of Tibet ===
- Climate
- Flora (plants of Tibet)
  - Lichens
  - Grasses
  - Ampelocissus xizangensis
  - Anisodus tanguticus
  - Aralia tibetana
  - Borinda
  - Buddleja crispa var. tibetica
  - Buddleja forrestii
  - Cedrus deodara
  - Cupressus gigantea
  - Cupressus torulosa
  - Fagopyrum tibeticum
  - Fallopia baldschuanica
  - Incarvillea
  - Juniperus indica
  - Juniperus tibetica
  - Luculia gratissima
  - Paeonia lactiflora
  - Russian sage
  - Noble rhubarb
  - Salvia castanea
  - Salvia wardii
  - Spikenard
  - Tetrapanax tibetanus
  - Tibetan elm
  - Siberian elm
  - Utricularia salwinensis
- Fauna
  - Tibetan wild ass
  - Tibetan gazelle
  - Snow leopard
  - Black-necked crane

=== Geographic features of Tibet ===
- Tibetan Plateau
  - Surrounding mountains:
    - Himalayas
    - Kunlun Mountains
    - Altyn-Tagh
    - Qilian Mountains
    - Hengduan Mountains
    - Karakoram
  - Lake Region (Changtang):
    - Pangong Tso
    - Lake Rakshastal
    - Lake Manasarovar
    - Yamdrok Lake
    - Dagze Lake
    - Namtso
    - Pagsum Lake
    - Siling Lake
    - Lhamo La-tso
    - Lumajangdong Co
    - Qinghai Lake
  - River region:
    - Yellow River
    - Yangtze River
    - Yalong River
    - Salween River (Nu)
    - Mekong (Lancang)
    - Indus River
    - Sutlej
    - South Tibet Valley:
      - Yarlung Tsangpo Grand Canyon
      - Yarlung Tsangpo River (Brahmaputra River)
      - Nyang River
      - Lake Paiku
      - Lake Puma Yumco

=== Administrative divisions of Tibet ===
Administrative divisions of Tibet

- Capital of Tibet: Lhasa

Tibet is divided into 7 prefecture-level divisions, 73 county-level divisions, and 692 township-level divisions. The 7 prefecture-level divisions are:

- Lhasa City
- Nagchu Prefecture
- Chamdo Prefecture
- Nyingtri Prefecture
- Shannan Prefecture
- Shigatse Prefecture
- Ngari Prefecture

There are also three traditional provinces or regions of Tibet:

- Ü-Tsang
- Amdo
- Kham

== Government and politics of Tibet ==
Politics in Tibet

- Form of government: Autonomous areas of China; Government in exile
- Capital of Tibet: Lhasa

=== Branches of the government of Tibet ===
==== Executive branch of the government of Tibet ====
- Chairman of the Tibet Autonomous Region: Padma Choling
- Local Communist Party secretary: Zhang Qingli

=== Foreign relations of Tibet ===
Foreign relations of Tibet

==== International organization membership ====
- none

=== Law and order in Tibet ===
Law of Tibet

- Constitution of Tibet
- Human rights in Tibet
  - LGBT rights in Tibet
  - Freedom of religion in Tibet

=== Government in exile ===
Central Tibetan Administration

- Sikyong or Kalon Tripa
- Parliament of the Central Tibetan Administration
- National Democratic Party of Tibet

== History of Tibet ==
- List of rulers of Tibet
- Neolithic Tibet
- Zhangzhung
- Pre-Imperial Tibet
- Tibetan Empire
- Tang–Tibet relations
- Era of Fragmentation
- Guge
- Song–Tibet relations
- Mongol conquest of Tibet
- Tibet under Yuan rule
- Bureau of Buddhist and Tibetan Affairs
- Imperial Preceptor
- Dpon-chen
- Phagmodrupa dynasty
- Rinpungpa
- Tsangpa
- Ming–Tibet relations
- Priest and patron relationship
- Ganden Phodrang
- Tibet under Qing rule
- Chinese expedition to Tibet (1720)
- Lifan Yuan
- Lhasa riot of 1750
- Golden Urn
- Chinese expedition to Tibet (1910)
- Xinhai Lhasa turmoil
- History of European exploration in Tibet
- British expedition to Tibet
- Tibet (1912–1951)
- Sino-Tibetan War
- Qinghai–Tibet War
- History of Tibet (1950–present)
- Annexation of Tibet by the People's Republic of China
- Battle of Chamdo
- CIA Tibetan program
- Protests and uprisings in Tibet since 1950
- 1959 Tibetan uprising
- 1987–1989 Tibetan unrest
- 2008 Tibetan unrest
- Self-immolation protests by Tibetans in China

== Culture of Tibet ==
Tibetan Culture

- Tibetan people
- Cuisine of Tibet
- Traditional Tibetan medicine
- Tibetan calendar
- Tibetan Festivals
- Public holidays
- Newspapers in Tibet
- Sport in Tibet

=== Religion in Tibet ===
- Religion in Tibet
- Tibetan Buddhism
- Tibetan Muslims
- Bön

=== Art in Tibet ===
- Tibetan art
- Contemporary Tibetan art
- Architecture of Tibet
- Tibetan Buddhist architecture
- World Heritage Sites in Tibet:
- Potala Palace
- Jokhang
- Norbulingka
- Tibetan-language films
- Tibetan Literature
- Music of Tibet
- Pargo Kaling

=== National symbols of Tibet ===
- Emblem of Tibet
- Flag of Tibet
- Tibetan National Anthem
- Tibetan Uprising Day

== Economy and infrastructure of Tibet ==
Economy of Tibet

- Currency: Renminbi Yuan (de facto)
- ISO 4217: CNY
- Education in Tibet
- Transport in Tibet
- Airports in Tibet
- Qingzang Railway
- Roads in Tibet

== See also ==
- Index of Tibet-related articles
- List of international rankings
- List of Tibet-related topics
- Outline of Asia
- Outline of China
- Outline of geography
