= Tibet Rug Mansion =

Building in Lhasa, Tibet, China

Coordinates: 29.64959°N 91.14205°E

Tibet Rug Mansion (Chinese: 西藏藏毯大厦), or Tibet Carpet Mansion, Tibet Rug Building is a building in Lhasa, Tibet Autonomous Region, China, located at No. 31, Jiangsu Road, Lhasa.

== History ==
The building is invested and constructed by Tibet Lhasa Carpet Limited Liability Company, which was formerly known as "Lhasa Carpet Factory" established in 1953, and its main business is the production of Tibetan rug. Tibet Rug Mansion integrates Tibetan carpet exhibition center, Tibetan carpet sales center, Tibetan carpet training center, Tibetan carpet research and development center, Tibetan carpet association activity center and Tibetan carpet museum.

== See also ==
- Tibetan rug
- Lhasa Carpet Factory
