= Toshe =

Toshe may refer to:

- Toshe (dish), a Sindhi Indian dish made from flour, ghee and milk
- Toeshey, traditional Tibetan dance music genre
