= Pinus massoniana var. hainanensis =

Conservation status
- Critically Endangered (IUCN 3.1)

Scientific classification
- Kingdom: Plantae
- Clade: Tracheophytes
- Clade: Gymnospermae
- Division: Pinophyta
- Class: Pinopsida
- Order: Pinales
- Family: Pinaceae
- Genus: Pinus
- Species: P. massoniana
- Variety: P. m. var. hainanensis

Trinomial name
- Pinus massoniana var. hainanensis W.C.Cheng & L.K.Fu, 1975

Extremely rare variety of conifer

Pinus massoniana var. hainenensis is an extremely rare variety of Pinus massoniana in the family Pinaceae that is endemic to a very small western portion of the island of Hainan, China, presumably on hillsides. The variety was described by Wan Chun Cheng and Li-kuo Fu in 1975.

Mature height and width is unknown, although the trunk is a red-brown color. Branches spread out horizontally. Needles reach a length of 12–20 cm (4.72-7.87 in.), and are slender. Cones are ovoid-cylindric, being 4-7 x 2.5–5 cm (1.57-2.75 in. x 0.88-1.96 in.) long.

It grows within a temperate climate; potentially growing beside Pinus fenzeliana.

Pinus massoniana var. hainenensis was listed and assessed as "Critically Endangered" by the IUCN Red List, for logging and localized deforestation are affecting its limited populations.

It is used as wood or timber by locals for personal uses such as furniture making.
