= List of newspapers in Tibet =

This is a list of newspapers published in Tibet.

== Newspapers currently published in Tibet ==
- Economic Daily News
- Outlook Tibet
- Tibet Daily
- Tibet Times

== Newspapers that have ceased publication in Tibet ==
- Tibet Mirror
- Tibet Vernacular Paper
- Lhasa Evening Post

== See also ==
- Media of the People's Republic of China
- List of newspapers in the People's Republic of China
