= Aquiline =

Aquiline may refer to

- Aquiline nose
- CIA Project AQUILINE
