= CIA Tibetan program =

Anti-Chinese government covert operation

Central Intelligence Agency (CIA)

The CIA Tibetan program was an anti-communist covert operation spanning almost twenty years. It consisted of "political action, propaganda, paramilitary and intelligence operations" facilitated by arrangements made with brothers of the 14th Dalai Lama, who himself was allegedly not initially aware of them. The stated goal of the program was "to keep the political concept of an autonomous Tibet alive within Tibet and among several foreign nations". The program was administrated by the CIA, and unofficially operated in coordination with domestic agencies such as the Department of State and the Department of Defense.

Previous operations had aimed to strengthen various isolated Tibetan resistance groups, which eventually led to the creation of a paramilitary force on the Nepalese border consisting of approximately 2,000 men. By February 1964, the projected annual cost for all CIA Tibetan operations had exceeded US$1.7 million.

The program ended after President Nixon visited China to establish closer relations in 1972. The Dalai Lama criticized the cessation of the program, declaring that this proved that there were ulterior motives other than helping the Tibetan people.

== Overview ==
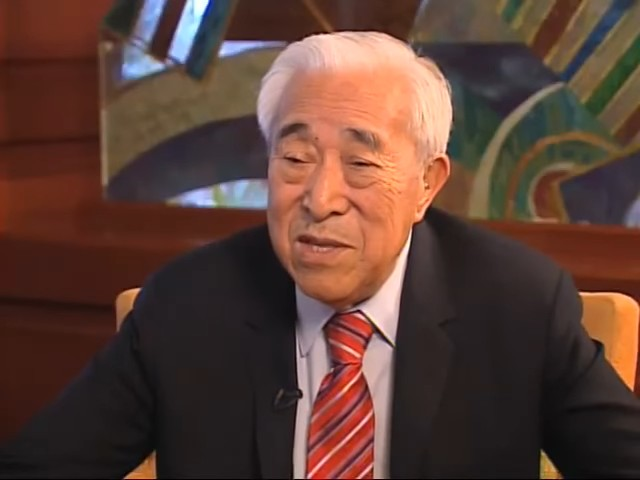
Gyalo Thondup, the second-eldest brother of the 14th Dalai Lama, was a "top asset" of the CIA.

In the fields of political action and propaganda, the CIA's Tibetan program was aimed at lessening the influence, capabilities, and territorial scope of the Government of China. Particularly, the United States feared communist involvement in the region. A 1957 report on logistical issues indicated increasing trepidation that the Chinese would escalate their communist presence in Tibet. The spread of communism in the international community was a huge concern for the United States. The CIA considered China's interest in Tibet to be a threat for multiple reasons. A 1950 memorandum noted that some of the reasons stemmed from a notion of bolstered sovereignty and a motivation to forge "a bulwark against possible invasion by western powers via India." However, they also believed that China would "use [Tibet as] a base for attacks against India and the Middle East in the third world war."

The approval and subsequent endorsement of the program were carried out by the Special Group of the United States National Security Council. The program consisted of several clandestine operations bearing the following code names:

- ST CIRCUS – Cover name for the training of Tibetan guerrillas on the island of Saipan, and at Camp Hale in Colorado. The recruits underwent rigorous military training, including weapons handling, guerrilla tactics, communication skills, and survival techniques. The goal was to equip them with the necessary skills to conduct resistance operations against Chinese forces in Tibet. Training in mountain warfare was particularly emphasized, given the rugged terrain of the Tibetan Plateau.
- ST BARNUM – Cover name for the airlifting of CIA agents, military supplies, and support equipment into Tibet. These supplies were often airdropped into remote areas of Tibet or delivered secretly through neighboring countries like India and Nepal. Airlifts were carried out using specially modified aircraft, and covert insertion techniques were employed to avoid detection by Chinese authorities.
- ST BAILEY – Cover name for a classified propaganda campaign. This operation focused on conducting propaganda campaigns to undermine Chinese influence in Tibet and increase support for Tibetan independence or autonomy. This involved disseminating pro-Tibetan messages through various channels, including radio broadcasts, leaflets, and other forms of media. The aim was to rally international support for the Tibetan cause and raise awareness about human rights abuses and cultural repression in Tibet under Chinese rule.

Chinese-Indian relations also played an important role in framing the CIA's operations. Due to Tibet's geographic location between the two countries, it was strategically important. The CIA released numerous reports assessing relations. The CIA monitored the relations between China and India in various ways, including media such as newspapers and radio broadcasts that reported on the changing relations between India and China. In October 1954, for example, a report was filed by CIA analysts concerning Indian Prime Minister Pt. Jawaharlal Nehru's visit to China. It assessed whether the two countries might or might not agree to from a diplomatic standpoint. Following the month-long Sino-Indian War of 1962, the CIA developed a close relationship with Indian foreign intelligence services in both training and supplying agents in Tibet.

While the Dalai Lama himself was hesitant to align with the anti-communist Chinese government in Taiwan, his brother Gyalo Thondup, had a lengthy history of contact with the CIA, as well as anti-communist governments such as the Kuomintang and its leader, Chiang Kai-shek. Thondup spent his early years in Nanjing, the capital of the Republic of China, where he "ate his meals at the Chiang family table, from April 1947 until the summer of 1949, and tutors selected by Chiang educated the boy." These close contacts with the KMT are confirmed in a 1959 Central Intelligence Agency bulletin which reveals that Thondup met with Kuomintang representatives "to sign an agreement which might be the basis for eventual Nationalist recognition of Tibetan 'independence' and a free Tibet government." However, the report later noted that "the Chinese Nationalists regard Tibet as an integral part of the China mainland,' making it "unlikely that Chiang would be willing to court the disfavor of his followers by offering an outright grant of independence." Despite Taiwan's reluctance to support outright calls for Tibetan independence, CIA front corporation Civil Air Transport, which had close links to the KMT, flew "more than 200 overflights of Mainland China and Tibet." According to historian William M. Leary, CAT flew 35–40 missions over Tibet between November 1959 and May 1960, and delivered around 400 tons of cargo to anti-communist resistance fighters.

The CIA worked to strengthen the Tibetans against the Chinese communist efforts. To do so, the United States planned to issue asylum to the Dalai Lama and his supporters. Some resistance fighters took their own lives when captured by the Chinese to avoid torture. Despite their efforts, Tibetan resistance fighters ultimately faced the reality that their struggle was unlikely to succeed in achieving full independence from Chinese rule. In the face of overwhelming Chinese military force and the lack of sufficient international support, some resistance fighters accepted Chinese annexation as inevitable. The Tibetan resistance was promised weaponry and resources from the West to continue their resistance against the Chinese. Knowing resistance was unlikely to succeed, the resistance accepted Chinese annexation.

== History ==
The Chinese army launched an invasion of the Tibetan capital of Lhasa, codenamed Operation Chamdo, in October 1950, thus solidifying the origin of the tension between China and Tibet. With this tension came Tibetan resistance towards China and the United States' interest in helping them fight the Chinese communist forces. In a memorandum from July 1958, the CIA described the growing resistance to the Chinese in Tibet. The memo noted, "During the past two and one half years, resistance has hardened and grown despite Chinese countermeasures that include military force as well as partial withdrawal of Chinese cadres and postponement of 'reforms' and other programs leading toward socialization" In the early 1950s, the CIA inserted paramilitary teams from the Special Activities Division (SAD) to train and lead Tibetan resistance fighters against the People's Liberation Army of China. The Tibetans were willing to fight the Chinese, as they shared the CIA's interests in stymieing the influence of communism from China on Tibet. The Tibetan people started to form anti-Chinese protests under the influence of the Dalai Lama. However, the government of Tibet did not encourage such anti-Chinese protests. Lhasa elites thought they could be easily replaced if the PRC laid reprisals for rebellion on them. The reasons behind the Tibetan people's motivation for the coup were because they perceived the Communist party, especially the Chinese, to be a threat to their religion: Buddhism, the religion of Tibet, is a form of Buddhism known as Vajrayana. The most significant facet obstructing the Chinese Communists from successfully infiltrating Tibet was its strong societal structure. The Ganden Phodrang led by the Gelugpa sect of Tibetan Buddhism was the governing political authority in addition to being the most powerful philosophical school. Tibetan polity was known as a theocracy. Monasteries historically tried to create peace and understanding between the people who gave them the power of mass ideological guidance.

In a recently unclassified document from the CIA, the notes and in-depth background information of Tibet was released to the public via the CIA's website. The paper entitled, "Tibet and China (Background Paper)", gave an overview of the situation between the Tibetan people and the Chinese. Rather than beginning with the issues during the publication of the paper (1959), the CIA recalled the history of the two to better understand the conflict. The Chinese and Tibetan conflicts began in the 13th century, according to the CIA documents, with the Mongols of Tibet and the Chinese government. The Tibetan religion was a form of Buddhism called Lamaism. During the 13th century, Mongols invaded Tibet, converted to Lamaism, and established Tibet as ruled under Mongols. The conquest of China by a Mongol followed, leading to close relations between the two. In the next century, A Buddhist leader came to power in Tibet, which led to the reforms within the Tibetan church and the establishment of the institution of the Dalai Lama, with the 1959 incumbent being the reincarnation of the Dalai Lama established in the 14th century.

== The Theocracy and Tibet Rulers ==
During the first half of the Twentieth Century and the Early Cold War era, Tibet lived under a theocratic system of governance. Despite the system of governance revolving around a religious ruler as the key figure in the government, there seems to be a clear distinction between the religious and secular components that make up the government. The Tibetan religion and its theocratic system of governance shared a coordinated leadership between the Dalai Lama and Panchen Lama. However, between the two institutions, the Panchen Lama seemed to be the superior. This situation could be traced to the fourteenth century, when Tibetan religious institutions developed, nurtured, and shaped. The Dalai Lama and Panchen Lama are both religious figures and offices. From time to time, a selection committee carefully nominates an individual to occupy the religious office, as when it becomes vacant following the demise of an incumbent leader. Such individuals are carefully searched and selected, believed to be reincarnations of a former and revered religious leader. In a direct relation to the establishment of the Dalai Lama was in connection with the emergence of a Buddhist leader, who "instituted the Tibetan church reforms and consolidated the position of a new sect." As a highly revered figure during his lifetime, an infant was discovered to be his reincarnation after his demise, thus marking the establishment of the institution of the Dalai Lama. During the 1950s, the occupant of the Dalai Lama office was said to be the 14th reincarnation. With regards to the Panchen Lama institution, its establishment was in connection with the Dalai Lama. The Panchen Lama emerged directly as an offshoot from the Dalai Lama, initially as a tutor to the infant and fifth reincarnation of the Dalai Lama around the seventeenth century. The Panchen Lama institution was established out of gratitude as a "mark of reverence to an aged tutor". He was regarded as a reincarnation of Buddha and was granted a monastery that was relatively on a smaller scale than that of the Dalai Lama monastery. Following this development, both the Dalai Lama and Panchen Lama began to share spiritual authority among the Tibetans, which continued to the 1950s.

As revered political and religious leaders, the actions of the Dalai Lama and Panchen Lama had implications and influence in Tibet and its political struggle with China. By March 1959, the situation in Tibet was coming to a head. In Lassa, news spread that the Dalai Lama had been invited to the local Chinese military camp to attend a theatrical show. He was to come alone without his bodyguards. This would prompt the people of Tibet to gather around the Dalai Lama's Palace, show support and solidarity, but ultimately, they were determined to protect him. This development and subsequent uprising, as a form of resistance against the Sino-China government of Tibet, would influence the Dalai Lama to flee his country, stating that his presence in Tibet under the Sino-China government would worsen the situation and development in Tibet. On the 31st of March 1959, the Dalai Lama entered India after negotiations with the CIA and the Indian government, where he sought asylum as a religious leader of Tibet in exile. The Dalai Lama's decision to escape probably influenced other resistant Tibetans to flee and go into exile, a development that would shape the guerrilla warfare and paramilitary operations on the southern border of the Tibet region.

Gyalo Thondup, the Dalai Lama's brother, was subsequently exiled to India and initiated contact with the Americans. Gyalo reached out to the Americans, who were intrigued with the opportunity to create a "running sore for the reds", as a part of their global anti-communist campaign. These contacts made by the Dalai Lama's brother eventually led to a more than 2-decade-long campaign against the Chinese government supported by the CIA. His American contacts enabled Tibetans to go over first to Saipan and then to the U.S. for training. They were trained for 5 months on combat maneuvers. These teams selected and then trained Tibetan soldiers in the Rocky Mountains of the United States, as well as at Camp Hale in Colorado. The SAD teams then advised and led these commandos against the Chinese, both from Nepal and India. In addition, SAD Paramilitary Officers were responsible for the Dalai Lama's clandestine escape to India, narrowly escaping capture by the Chinese government. The Dalai Lama had also gotten very ill during the journey and almost did not make it to India.

=== 1951 ===
The Tibetan government was alarmed at the gains the Chinese Communist forces were making. As a response, they expelled the representative of the Nationalist government from Lhasa. The Tibetan authorities were aware of the potential conflict with China. China then moved its forces into the eastern part of Tibet and demanded that Tibetan forces to cooperate. The Tibetan military forces surrendered. After negotiating, Tibetan representatives signed an agreement with the Chinese Communist government. The agreement was intended to provide a peaceful liberation of Tibet. By reaching this agreement, the Chinese Communist forces were now allowed to enter Tibet without further fighting. This document consisted of a preamble and 17 articles that would serve as the basis for governing the Chinese position in Tibet for the next eight years. The document opens with the assertion that now, Tibet had returned "to the big family of the motherland", that being the CCP. Furthermore, within the document, there was an article which related to "reforms". This article suggests that the CCP would not force them on the Tibetan population, but in accordance with the wishes of the CCP, the Tibetan government would undertake its own reforms. The document also indicated that people within Tibet who had "imperialist" loyalties may remain in their positions, given that they sever their old, anti-CCP ties. In exchange, the Chinese would not alter or affect the current government in Tibet, nor would they affect the status and authority of the Dalai Lama and Panchen Lama. The aforementioned agreement actually indicated that Tibetan local troops would be recognized as a part of the Chinese Communist forces. This was not implemented in large part, but many high-ranking officials of Tibetan origin were given high-ranking positions in the Chinese military. In October 1951, 12,000 troops from the PLA entered Tibet. Initially, China wanted to send 45,000 troops, but Tibet refused the request, threatening to send the Dalai Lama to India if their refusal was not respected. However, the Tibetans were convinced the Chinese forces in Tibet were not capable of pressing the issue at the time. The composition of the 12,000 soldiers that were sent included 10,000 infantrymen, an animal transport battalion, a battalion of army engineers, and approximately 50 technicians who specialized in the areas of geology, surveying, telecommunications, cultural affairs, propaganda, and party affairs. Additionally, violence directed toward the Tibetan people originated from Beijing. According to an archive document from the National Security Archive at the George Washington University, "Beijing has pursued...suppressing violent protests, arresting scores of ethnic Tibetans in the Qinghai province, which borders Tibet, sentencing one to prison for 13 years, and renewing accusations that the Dalai Lama is encouraging anti-Beijing actions."

Along with the agreement that Tibet was promised the right to local self-government in all internal matters. The Chinese central government in no shape or form was to alter the existing political system or the established status and authority of the Panchen Lama and the Dalai Lama. Thus, the religious institution of Tibet would be protected.

A memo distributed by the CIA on November 20 detailed that the Chinese military, as of October 10, 1951, had arrested over 200 Tibetan people (29 women) for refusing to sell supplies along with desecrating a monastery (Gatza Monastery) in search of weapons. The Chinese military utilized various propaganda to establish a campaign of pacification to suppress growing resentment held by the Tibetan people over Chinese subjugation.

In December, the CIA distributed a report regarding the activities of PLA troops in Tibet. The report contained details regarding new troop activity in Tibet, troop movement, and the PLA's plan to construct a highway connecting Tibet and China. In addition to the information mentioned above, the report outlined China's plan to relocate the Panchen Lama back into Tibet, create military ties between China and Tibet, and build military training facilities within Tibet by March 1952.

=== 1952 ===
The State Department received communication from Thondup in May that revealed an assortment of information concerning the situation in Tibet. The CIA used the line of communication with Thondup to cultivate a credible source of intelligence on the ground and administer possible operations moving forward. Thondup described mounting Tibetan hostility toward the occupying Chinese Communist forces and the recent armed conflict in Lhasa between Tibetan demonstrators and Chinese Communist military police. From the intelligence, the CIA learned of the 10,000–15,000 Chinese troops stationed in Tibet. A dire food shortage also exacerbated tensions as Tibetans found it increasingly difficult to provide food for the people. Furthermore, the communication with Thondup revealed the workings of covert actions from Tibetans who refused to follow the Dalai Lama's acceptance of Chinese Communist occupation. The CIA and the State Department both expressed optimism with the circumstances in Tibet and Lhasa, believing that they could maneuver accordingly.

In September 1952, a CIA intelligence report noted the difficulty in continuing to support the Tibetan resistance when the Chinese Communist government and the massive People's Liberation Army (PLA) fully occupied the country. As a result of this Chinese domination over the Tibetans, direct diplomatic relations between Tibet and India ceased. A daily Hindi newspaper reported that this move had ended 16 years of direct contact between the governments of India and Tibet. India was able to have direct communications until that point because China's authority in Tibet was still limited. In the final paragraph of the article, the newspaper writes, "The Chinese occupation of Tibet a year ago has changed this relationship. The cause was inevitable, and India had no choice but to accept this arrangement because the Chinese Communists now have complete control of the foreign affairs of Tibet". Previously, India had provided a link for the United States' support to the Tibetan resistance. In December 1952, the CIA produced an Information Report (Classification: Secret) containing two items in the subject line: 1) Anti-Communist Activities, Tibet, and 2) Chinese Communist Activities, Tibet. The document shows that the agency was closely scrutinizing both Tibetan and Chinese groups and individuals at the time, as well as any other obtained intelligence. The report defines the anti-Communist Tibetan People's Party and identifies geographic areas where the Party's support was strongest. Thirty-six-year-old Lhopto Rimpochhe was named as the leader of the "warrior monks". The document goes on to report on intelligence regarding a petition sent to the Chinese authorities in Lhasa by Ragashar Shape, Tibetan Defense Minister, that went ignored. The Shape petition included the following points: the Dalai Lama should continue to rule unchallenged; monastery estates should not be confiscated; Tibetans should thank the Chinese for liberation but kindly ask them to leave and, in return, the Tibetan people would never ask for military assistance from the Chinese; and persuading the Chinese to "please buy the [Tibetan] wool." The document then proceeded to provide intelligence on various undesired actions taken by the Chinese including forcing the Dalai Lama to give a speech that threatened the death and kidnapping of over 200 children with the purpose of retraining them (one was even beheaded as a warning to the others not to cry and complain), and the installation of a puppet governor at Kham. Next, the document listed nine names of Tibetans acting as informers against the Chinese. Lastly, Chinese forces in Tibet were addressed—numbers of troops, names, and leadership transition information. A 1952 CIA report on psychological vulnerabilities in Tibet suggested that small Chinese groups were learning the Tibetan language to remain in control.

=== 1953 ===
By February 1953, the Chinese government was attempting a military build-up in Tibet. Airfields could specifically be an advantage as Tibet could then be used as a refueling station between China and India, allowing for China to fly extended combat missions over India and target its northern cities. Additionally, as the highest geographical point, Tibet could maintain an aerial advantage over the region. A CIA information report dated July 31, 1953, reveals the CIA was closely monitoring Chinese projects in Tibet. The report notes that earlier that year, Chinese soldiers "attempted to build airfields at Lhasa", the capital of the Tibet Autonomous Region, and Gartok, now called Gharyarsa. However, the Dalai Lama disapproved of the project, leading to its cessation. In May 1953, over 1,000 Chinese soldiers marched into the Chumbi Valley with five field artillery pieces. These soldiers increased Chinese presence in Tibet to approximately 20,000 soldiers—all mainly stationed in Chumbi Valley, Bartok, Rudog, and north of Lhasa. In October 1953, the Chinese government placed travel restrictions in Tibet, diverting the established Tibetan wool trade routes further to the West. Concurrently, the Chinese were using Tibetan labor to create new roadways that would be controlled by the Chinese, which resulted in the Chinese controlling nearly all travel within Tibet. Road construction was a major effort made by the Chinese forces, as the previously unpaved mountain roads would slow down logistical efforts. In December 1953, China communicated to the Indian Ambassador their position on Tibet; the Chinese presented nine demands to the Indian Ambassador. Their demands included that they do not tolerate any further Indian interest in Tibet and that no objection must be made by India to the Chinese construction of fortifications in Tibet near the Indian and Nepalese borders. Another of the demands stated that India must have a strong policy to abolish illegal activities of foreign agents working on the Indian side of the border.

=== 1954 ===
In April 1954, after four months of negotiating, India and China agreed to the Sino-Indian Treaty, which was a treaty that discussed how China would not allow the continuation of India's interest in Tibet. Part of India's obligations based on the terms of the treaty was to devise a robust policy targeting illegal activities along the border between India and Tibet. Any Civilians or soldiers who were crossing the border into Nepal were also to be left alone. Finally, India was not allowed to support any person who may question the sensitive issue of Tibet to the United Nations (UN). China allowed India to retain their three trade agencies in Tibet in exchange for three trade agencies for China in India, while also allowing India to maintain three trade posts in Tibet at Yatung, Gyantse, and Gartok. In exchange, India was to allow China to keep three trade posts in New Delhi, Calcutta and Kalimpong. The borders were opened for those who wished to visit religious shrines, but China ordered India to withdraw its armed forces. China also ordered India to hand over postal, telegraph, and telephone facilities it had been operating in Tibet. A group of Kazakhs was invited to the Tibetan capital of Lhasa to discuss the political status of the group. The trade between Tibet and China started off really strong. China positively influenced the Tibetan economy by introducing silver dollars to Tibet. The products were generally unloaded in Tibet by plane, and from there they were taken on a camel caravan. Tibetans typically utilized camels during cold weather. However, horses, mules, and donkeys were also used to transport products in fair weather.

=== 1955–1957 ===
In 1955, a group of local Tibetan leaders secretly plotted an armed uprising, and rebellion broke out in 1956, with the rebels besieging several Chinese government agencies, killing hundreds of Chinese government staff, and killing many Han Chinese people.

Due to this uprising, the Tibetan-Chinese relationship became strained. In April 1957, the Chinese Communists postponed Tibetan reforms until sometime after 1962. Outraged, "rebellions continued to occur in the eastern part of the region" . Other surrounding tribes began to fight alongside the Tibetan people in an effort to combat the Chinese.

In May 1957, a rebel organization and a rebel fighting force were established and began a targeted campaign to exterminate communist officials, disrupt communication lines, and bombard Chinese institutions and troops who were deployed in the region. This coincides (chronologically) with the creation of the Preparatory Committee for the Tibet Autonomous Region, an organization created to help the Chinese undermine the religious and political systems of Tibet. The Tibetans knew that they could not fight off the Chinese on their own so they called in help from an outside source. It was in the shared interest of both Tibet and the United States to limit the power of the Chinese within Tibet's borders. The Americans thought that this would be a great opportunity to prevent the spread of Communism throughout Southeast Asia. Starting in 1956, the CIA initiated a large-scale clandestine operation against the communist Chinese. During December 1956, the Dalai Lama had left Tibet to attend a Buddhist celebration in India.

A briefing for the DCI from 1959 mentions that "as far back as 1956, we began to receive reports indicating the spread of Tibetan revolt against Chinese communists through areas inhabited by Khamba tribes in eastern Tibet." Eastern Tibet already had resentment against Lhasa, like many citizens that live on the periphery of states do against capitals. Citizens of Eastern Tibet were especially bothered by the notion of being ruled by people even further away in Beijing.

By May 1957, a rebel organization with its own fighting force was established with the support of the CIA. This was the first time that many Tibetans had seen a white man in person. They subsequently received training for the next five months. Some of the things that they learned while training included the use of modern weaponry, guerrilla tactics, espionage, codes, and operation of hand-cranked radio transmitter/receivers. Tibetans took this training very seriously and can be quoted stating that they "lived to kill Chinese." Because they viewed Chinese as a direct threat to their religion, they viewed animal life as more sacred than the life of the Chinese communists against whom they rebelled.

In late 1958, in a Spartan-like setting nestled 10,000 feet above sea level in the Rocky Mountains of Colorado, the CIA trained more Tibetans at Camp Hale with a total of 259 Tibetans trained over five years in tactics representative of guerrilla warfare. The CIA established a secret military training camp called Camp Hale, located near Leadville, Colorado, where the Tibetans were trained to sabotage operations against the Communist Chinese. One of the reasons for the location of Camp Hale was its elevation—10,000 feet above sea level. The altitude preference was thought to mimic the terrain and climate of the Himalayas. The camp shut down in 1966, despite the conclusion of program training occurring already in 1961. Units from eastern Tibet that were the most dedicated to their religion, had the most battlefield success against Communists. Years later, the CIA equipped fighters in Afghanistan who were the most effective, were also the most religiously devoted.

=== 1958–1960 ===
In 1958, with the rebellion in Kham ongoing, two of these fighters, Athar and Lhotse, attempted to meet with the Dalai Lama to determine whether he would cooperate with their activities. However, their request for an audience was refused by Lord Chamberlain, Phala Thubten Wonden, who believed such a meeting would be unwise. According to Tsering Shakya, "Phala never told the Dalai Lama or the Kashag of the arrival of Athar and Lhotse. Nor did he inform the Dalai Lama of American willingness to provide aid".

In 2005, multiple documents pertaining to the CIA's involvement within foreign countries were released. The Tibetan situation was highly important to the Central Intelligence Agency. They documented different aspects of the situation in Tibet and the history of their involvement with the Chinese government. In an un-classified document, "Notes for DCI Briefing of Senate and Foreign Relations Committee on 28 April 1958," the background of the situation os provided along with the US policy toward the situation. The US maintained their lack of stance towards the Chinese and the Tibetans. The US did not come out with statement against the Chinese Nationalists, maintaining "strategic silence on status of Tibet."

The situation in Tibet by the late 1950s revealed a strategic and economic interest in maneuvering against the Chinese Communists. Providing aid to the Tibetans continued to occur in the reports flowing in and out of the CIA. Several reports documented the economic needs of Tibetans and compared them to the known resources of the Chinese Communists in the Tibetan Army District. Control of the few networks of roads traversing the mountainous terrain granted the Chinese Communists access to the resources they needed to sustain military occupation. This was problematic for the Americans who needed a way to provide any aid to the Tibetan resistance movements. However, the reports weighing the logistics and costs of supplying aid to the Tibetans revealed that American interests were fueled by opposition to the Chinese Communists rather than a support of Tibetan liberation. The report ultimately concluded that the economic effort required to support troops in Tibet would only have a "modest if not almost negligible impact on the economy of Communist China."

Gompo Tashi leader of a Tibetan band of resistance fighters receiving support from the CIA established his headquarters in Triguthang. Thousands of Tibetan resistance fighters gathered there, calling themselves the "Tensung Dhanglang Magar (Voluntary Force for the Defense of Buddhism). Two CIA trained Tibetan radio operators were witnessing and messaging the CIA. This led to the CIA establishing training of Tibetan Guerilla fighters at Camp Hale in Colorado. The CIA would make numerous supply drops throughout the year to the resistance fighters. The first drop included 15000 Lee-Enfield rifles.

In March 1959 the Dalai Lama was invited to attend a function in Lhasa by the Chinese. The Tibetan people were worried that the Dalai Lama would be abducted by the Chinese. As a response “violent anti-Chinese demonstrations occurred throughout the city”. This led to the 1959 Tibetan uprising. Since they had feared he risked kidnapping, they decided to protect him by moving him to an area that was located just outside Lhasa. After his relocation, the Chinese Communist authorities claimed that the Dalai Lama had been kidnapped by these Tibetan rebels, and began a militarized search for him. This would be an issue because in the same month, the Dalai Lama had been named as a delegate to the National People's Congress. The attacks made on Chinese people to protect the Dalai Lama prompted the Chinese to retaliate, as they believed the treaty had been broken.

A 1959 DCI briefing highlights the measures in which citizens took to protect the Dalai Lama. The report says, "Thousands of Tibetan demonstrators then took the Dalai Lama into protective custody in his summer palace just outside Lhasa". Chinese military forces killed tens of thousands of Tibetans along with thousands more fleeing behind the Dalai Lama. During this revolt, supporters were reported to have "knocked out a Chinese outpost manned by 80 soldiers, interrupted communications with Peiping, and plastered walls of Lhasa with posters declaring 'independent kingdom of Tibet.'" The Chinese attempted to make the Dalai Lama stop the uprising, but they could not, which then led to his flight to India. The Dalai's clandestine departure to India started on March 17, 1959, involved him wearing a disguise where he dressed as a soldier and moved with a column of troops to the Indian border. Resistance fighters smuggled him out of the Potala and through rebel-held territory. Two troops who met the Dalai Lama's escort along the way were trained by the CIA and they reached back to their American contacts via radio to secure permission for the Dalai Lama and his troops to enter India. Permission was granted. Prior to his flight to India (due to shots being fired outside the palace), the Dalai Lama and the Tibet representative were sending letters back and forth to each other in hopes of avoiding an attack. The Dalai Lama continued fighting for independence for Tibet outside India. Finally, with the hope of halting Chinese aggression and demands, India recognized Tibet as part of China.

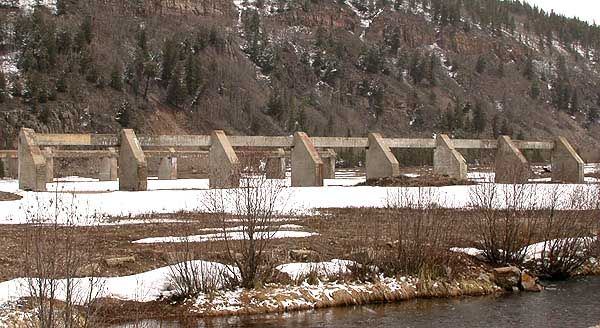
In 1959, the CIA opened a secret facility to train Tibetan recruits at Camp Hale near Leadville, Colorado.

In 1959, the Dalai Lama and approximately 100,000 followers fled to India and Nepal. The rebels continued to attack Chinese government officials, disrupting communication lines, and targeting Chinese troops. Following a mass uprising in Lhasa in 1959 during the celebration of the Tibetan New Year and the ensuing Chinese military response, the Dalai Lama went into exile in India. At this point, the Chinese began changing their policy of working through institutions to build the Communist Party in Tibet. They began to replace the government with Communist-sponsored leaders. By this time, the rebels were under constant Chinese attack and losing the remaining ground that they controlled. A declassified DCI briefing of the Senate Foreign Relations Committee offered some further elaboration on the Dalai Lama's position in India. The Dalai Lama remained insistent on wanting to establish a free Tibet, which threatened his asylum in India. Prime Minister Nehru vowed to protect the Dalai Lama's right to practice his spirituality, but would not condone any anti-communist politics coming from the Dalai Lama. He granted the Dalai Lama asylum on March 31 following a secret meeting with the Dalai Lama's brother. Nehru's main reason for this was that India had previously recognized Tibet as part of China. The evidence seemed to imply that popular Indian sentiment and reactions to this policy caused Nehru to become more sympathetic toward Tibet. Yet, the rest of this section was redacted from the public record. In response to Nehru granting the Dalai Lama asylum, Peiping accused Nehru of encouraging "vicious attacks on China". After the Chinese government continued to place pressure on him, Nehru spoke out against China and stated that Peiping's "charges against India are so fantastic that I find it difficult to deal with them."

From 1959 to 1960, the CIA parachuted four groups of Camp Hale trainees to meet up with the Tibetan resistance. In the autumn of 1959, the CIA parachuted the second group of sixteen men into Chagra Pembar to link up with the resistance. By January 1960, the CIA parachuted the fourth and last team into Tibet. Along with these air drops, the CIA also provided pallets of lethal aid to the resistance, including rifles, mortars, grenades, and machine guns. All the CIA-trained Tibetans from Camp Hale left with personal weapons, wireless sets, and a cyanide tablet strapped onto each man's left wrist.

Map of transportation network in Communist China in 1959

The resistance movement did accomplish the job of bringing great cost and distraction to the Chinese government. CIA estimates in 1959 were that the Chinese had around 60,000 troops in Tibet and needed 256 tons of supplies daily. Due to there only being 3 viable transport routes into Tibet, the CIA also estimated that if they could get the Chinese to double the needed supplies, then the existing infrastructure would not be able to keep up with supplies without supplementary airlifts or construction to repair existing routes. The CIA estimated that even with these supplemental airlifts, it would cause substantial disruption in other air services and the Chinese could not expect to supply double its commitments long-term, which would further the American goal of disrupting the Chinese economic structure through clandestine operations in Tibet. The Lanzhou-Lhasa highway was the ideal logistical land supply route at 2,148 km long. The CIA took into consideration factors including road construction, width, grades, curves, bottlenecks, and road conditions impacted by weather when calculating the logistical capacity of the prospective Chinese roads. The CIA estimated China could support up to 90,000 troops in Tibet for a few months, but only 60,000 for an extended deployment. In order to support 90,000 troops in the region, China would have to use the Lan-chou-Lhasa highway to its capacity and would require around 7,000 supply trucks per month. However, such heavy usage of the road was estimated to have the potential to cause substantial damage. The CIA also considered how a build-up of Chinese troops would affect the railroads and determined that, although congestion could impose some burden on the supply chain, there would be no significant effect on the lines. However, if one of the lines failed due to a washout or other reason, supplies would have to be trucked into the staging areas, which the CIA determined would be a time-consuming operation. However, two to three trains per day to the staging areas would be able to provide enough supplies to sustain 180,000 troops in Tibet, making the trains a prime target for sabotage. Petroleum usage in Tibet was estimated at 2.7% of China's total availability, with a total usage of around 200,000 tons for the year.

In 1959, the CIA issued assessment documents that highlighted the background, logistical issues, and the international fallout in regard to Tibet. One paper, entitled "Tibet and China (Background Papers)", described the history and geography of Tibet. The CIA assessed that the economy of Tibet had not changed despite eight years of Chinese rule. The agency concluded that rebellions against Chinese communists would continue in Tibet throughout the years, but believed that the rebellions could not damage the hold that China had on Tibet. The CIA believed that the Chinese aggression in Tibet had severely damaged China's standing within Afro-Asian countries, going against its image as a neutral peacemaker in the region that they had been cultivating since the Bandung Conference in 1955. In the briefing note, the CIA stated that the governments of neutral Asian countries, notably India and Burma, had encouraged press and popular opposition to Chinese aggression in Tibet. This was despite the fact that the governments did not formally sanction China for its actions. The background paper specified that one of the strongest reactions to China was from Malaya in which the Foreign Minister condemned the action and likened it to Soviet harsh responses in Hungary. Prince Norodom Sihanouk from Cambodia also showed his sympathy to Tibet and "expressing surprise" that Prime Minister Nehru did not take firmer action against Peking. There were protests on China's repression in Tibet, as shown in the press sections in some countries such as Burma, Indonesia, Pakistan, the Philippines, Japan, and the United Arab Republic. The CIA also noted that the Chinese government reported there to be "only about 20,000" resistance forces still living in parts of southern and remote regions of Tibet and west China and that they would abandon their previous cautious policy to enforce assimilation of Tibetans. Another report, "Logistical Problems of the Tibetan Campaign", studied the strengths, weaknesses, and power of the Chinese military in Tibet. The report concluded that the Chinese military had hundreds of thousands of soldiers at its disposal and had a good supply of aircraft, but identified the supply roads as a major weakness. The documents remained classified until the early 2000s.

The CIA Tibetan Task Force continued the operation against Chinese forces alongside the Tibetan guerrilla army for another 15 years, until 1974. This was the same time that the United States ceased making monthly payments to the Dalai Lama. The goal was to keep Tibet autonomous both within Tibet and in the international community.

=== 1960–1972 ===
As stated by Palden Wangyal, a veteran guerrilla fighter, the rebels were directly paid by the Americans to attack Chinese government facilities and installations in Tibet:

"Our soldiers attacked Chinese trucks and seized some documents of the Chinese government. After that, the Americans increased our pay scale".

Flag of the Chushi Gangdruk, a prominent Tibetan guerrilla organization backed by the CIA

Some CIA trainees ended up commanding an army of 2,000 resistance fighters dubbed the Chushi Gangdruk, or "Four Rivers, Six Gorges". These fighters specialized in ambushing Chinese targets from elevated bases in the mountains of Nepal.

It was also during these years that the CIA was beginning to upgrade its aerial intelligence system. Previously, the only aerial intelligence the CIA had ever had was the U-2s created for the OXCART program in 1960. Even though the mission was a success, there were significant risks that came with it, including detection as well as the possibility of pilot loss. Newer research done by the CIA during this time allowed for the introduction of unmanned aerial vehicles (UAVs) as intelligence collection platforms. The agency program codenamed Aquiline (which means of or like the eagle) was the first operation to test this new concept. Its possibilities were to replace in-place agent operations, while being able to capture photography of the inside of a country like the Soviet Union. Operation Aquiline never ended up becoming operational during this time, but did provide the perfect concept as a forerunner to today's UAVs of multi-capabilities.

Furthermore, the CIA was attempting to assist the Tibetan rebels in enhancing their ability to move troops and materials. The CIA conducted studies on how the Tibetan resistance movement could best counter the Chinese Communists. Therefore, the CIA worked with the leaders of the campaign to garner more support for the resistance as well as manage the logistics of the movement of these troops. The CIA examined the difficulty in moving the additional forces necessary to counter the Chinese. This logistical conundrum meant that the CIA was giving recommendations for the capacity and ability of roadways to support the troop movements. Without this logistical support, the Tibetans could not sufficiently counter the Chinese Communists. However, a declassified CIA document from July 1958 outlined the agency's assessment of the possibility that Communists would infiltrate Tibetan society, and completely assimilate all aspects of Tibetan life into the culture of Communist China.

The CIA was aware of China's attempts at enacting cultural assimilation in Tibet and, therefore, they wanted to take measures to counteract that possibility. However, according to the document, the possibility of the "complete integration", of "political, social, and economic" aspects of Tibetan life was not substantial.

The CIA's involvement in the Tibetan resistance was part of a broader geopolitical strategy aimed at countering Communist expansionism and influence in Asia during the Cold War. By supporting Tibetan rebels, the CIA sought to undermine Chinese Communist control in Tibet and prevent the spread of communism in the region, aligning with broader U.S. foreign policy objectives in containing communist regimes globally.

By early 1960, the camp at Chagra Pembar had grown considerably larger since it was established the year prior. Its position was strategic for being between Lhasa and China, and eastern Tibet, overall, was noted by the CIA for being "a favorable milieu for guerrilla warfare". This strategic positioning combined with the increase in Tibetan guerrillas made Chagra Pembar a target for China. Chagra Pembar was bombed by Chinese forces early in the year over the course of several days, which killed thousands, including both guerrillas and civilians. "Only five of the Chagra Pembar parachutists survived; the rest died in the Chinese attacks or were hunted down later." Another camp, Nira Tsogeng, located near the Indian region of Ladakh, was also targeted by the Chinese in this attack. This attack was especially disheartening, as the CIA had dropped 430 pallets of weapons and other supplies to the 4,000 Tibetan fighters at the camp. Many at Nira Tsogeng who survived the initial bombings would later succumb to dehydration due to being saddled with their dependents and some 30,000 animals as they attempted to cross the arid Ladakh plain.

In the summer of 1960, the CIA funded a rebellion within the region of Upper Mustang, and which was gathered by a Resistance Fighter under Bapa Gen Yeshe who ended up gathering up to 2100 fighter which was a mix of many Tibetans fleeing to the camp. The gathering rebellion was still not supplied well with many of the resistance fighters dying of cold and starvation due to CIA reluctance to send supplies with the U-2 due to the U-2 Spy plane inside of Soviet territory in May 1960. However, in spring of 1961 the CIA sent a cache of supplies to the resistance as well as seven men teams through Nepal.

In late 1961, the resistance forces were facing pressure from the CIA to gather more intelligence on the Chinese. Later called the "blue satchel raid", CIA Operations Officer John Kenneth Knaus described the raid as, "one of the greatest intelligence hauls in the history of the Agency." This raid obtained documents that allowed the CIA a glimpse into the reality of the Chinese government who noted their difficulties in continuing "The Great Leap Forward" and with Tibet. This changed the focus of the CIA as they informed the Tibetans not to attack the Chinese but rather to gather intelligence on their enemy. Despite these orders from the CIA, yearly raids during the winter months continued on Chinese encampments and harassment of communist outposts, troops and convoys continued.

Long before the current Chinese occupation, Tibet had a longstanding tradition of independence. The memo cites numerous historical accounts of Chinese attempts at conquering and controlling Tibet, none of which ended in success or the integration of Tibet into Chinese society. The documents also mention the problematic "terrain, climate, and location" of Tibet. Tibet contains protruding mountains, massive plateaus, deep river valleys, and gaping gorges that make communication and military operations extremely arduous. The topography of the region enhanced the isolation felt by large swaths of the population, allowing for guerrilla warfare to thrive and causing "political fragmentation among the Kham", the southeastern region of Tibet. Because most Tibetans are peasants and not monks or nobles, they have experience with the terrain and are often nomads. This nomadic propensity consequently affects how they maintain their independent spirit. The Chinese focused substantial resources on keeping roads and supply lines functioning, a difficult task in Tibet's challenging landscape. Other CIA documents reaffirm this notion by recognizing the enormous cost of resupplying operatives and keeping supply chains moving in the country.

The July 1958 document also cites the structure of Tibetan society as a primary source of trouble for the Chinese. Tibetan society revolves around the Lamaist Church, and its spiritual leader the Dalai Lama. The Dalai Lama was not merely a spiritual guide, but a political and ideological leader. Tibetan monasteries were more than just houses of worship, they were the economic and political centers of Tibetan society, which allowed the clergy to wield considerable power. The clergy was conservative and extremely traditionalistic. This traditionalism meant that any deviation from traditional Tibetan life was strictly opposed. Altogether, the author suggests that the socialization of Tibet may be "prolonged" despite the substantial investments of the Chinese to integrate the area. Tibetan's spirit for independence, the country's fractured and isolated population, the harsh Chinese policies, and the Chinese military occupation all contribute to the problems that the Chinese have had in controlling the country.

The McMahon Line, proposed in 1914 by British colonial administrator Henry McMahon, is the demarcation line between Tibet and the North-east region of India, stretching along the crest ridge of the Himalayas. The Chinese, however, refuse to accept the McMahon Line as the legal boundary. Nevertheless, India remains adamant that it stands. With this disagreement, the Chinese believe that they have grounds for charging Indian troops with the invasion of their territory. Tibet is predominantly composed of rugged terrain, with plateaus, mountains and deep river valleys. However, the land has never been surveyed, and no markers have been placed, thus providing room for disagreement.

In 1972, before the seismic head-of-state meeting between Chairman Mao and President Nixon, the CIA cut off all support to the Tibetan resistance as American foreign policy objectives shifted to normalizing diplomatic relations with China (see Nixon's visit to China). As a result, each of the 1,500 CIA-trained rebels received 10,000 rupees to buy land in India or to open a business instead of fighting the People's Liberation Army of China. Additionally, the White House decided that the training of Tibetan guerrillas by the CIA would have to cease because the risk of damaging Sino-American relations would be too high and costly.

This rebellion was one of the greatest intelligence successes of the Cold War because of the significant number of Chinese military documents captured by Tibetan fighters and given to the CIA. At the end of this operation, although it may have been successful, it also failed because the resistance collapsed after the Dalai Lama told them to stop fighting after the CIA stopped support for the Mustang Insurgency in 1974.

The CIA is alleged to have been involved in another failed revolt in October 1987, resulting in unrest and the continuation of Chinese repression until May 1993.

== Contemporary Tibet–China relationship ==
Although the Chinese liberalization program for Tibet occurred decades ago, there is still tension between the two parties, in part, because of the U.S. involvement. In late September 2012, a U.S. Ambassador visited Beijing but also met with Tibetan monks. The Ambassador is Gary Locke, who himself is a third-generation Chinese American. The fact that he met with Tibetan monks displeased China. The tension between Tibet and China has influenced the Chinese to "always protests vehemently whenever U.S. officials meet with the Dalai Lama."

China also faces opposition movements from the Uyghur Muslims in Xinjiang province, an autonomous region of northwest China, as well as the Falun Gong. Inspired by these tensions and domestic schisms, the CIA is thought to look for the right opportunity to destabilize Chinese rule in Tibet.

Any present concerns that the Chinese government has with Lhasa have been amplified by the establishment of a special security unit, the 110 Command Center, whose primary objective is "suppressing the disturbances and restoring full central government control." There were also large deployments of units from the former Chengdu Military Region, including brigades from the 149th Mechanized Army Division, which acted as the region's rapid reaction force.

Many foreign policy officials in Washington continue to view China with a critical eye, aided in their view by CIA assessments which view China as non-cooperative in the war on terror. The CIA charges that China does not stop the flow of arms and men from western China (including Xinjiang) into Afghanistan and Central Asia, bolstering support for Islamic terrorist organizations in the region. This has included the East Turkestan Islamic Movement, which U.S. officials report has enjoyed support from the Taliban.

Modernization has also made it easier for the Chinese to resupply due in part to the construction of the first railway into Tibet occurring between 2001 and 2007. This railway makes for easier movement of troops and equipment.

== Costs ==
A total of 1,735,000 U.S. dollars (equivalent to $18,010,864 in 2025) was devoted to the Tibetan program for FY1964.

The following table illustrates the costs of the CIA's Tibetan program in 1964:

Item	Cost
Tibetan resistance efforts in Nepal	US$500,000
Tibet Houses in New York and Geneva (1/2 year)	US$75,000
Training	US$855,000
Subsidy to the Dalai Lama	US$180,000
Miscellaneous costs	US$125,000

Moreover, the estimate for the Tibetan program underwent an estimated budget cut of $570,000 in 1968 when the United States relinquished all related training programs. The remaining $1,165,000 was allocated to the CIA budget for the program in the fiscal year 1968. However, a considerable degree of uncertainty exists regarding the exact amount approved for the program during this time due to classification issues.

== International lobbying ==
The 14th Dalai Lama was financially supported by the CIA between the late 1950s and the mid-1970s, receiving $180,000 a year. The funds were paid to him personally, although he used most of them for Tibetan government-in-exile activities such as funding foreign offices to lobby for international support.

In a CIA document, they noted that many Asian nations were not willing to sponsoring Tibetan case at the U.N. or even the possibility of granting asylum for the Dalai Lama. Some reasons for nations not supportive of the Tibetan people include Burma's dispute with China regarding their northern border, the document speculates that Thailand may have been hesitant due to a "different form of Buddhism", and lastly, due to Buddhist countries' lack of support, Muslim nations and the Philippines did not want to act. It is also noted in the document that these nations also did not want to formerly invite the Dalai Lama to visit their countries.

The Dalai Lama sought asylum in India, but the issues regarding Tibet and China received substantial attention from the press. Many protests erupted in response to the political conflicts between Tibet and China in countries including Burma, Pakistan, and Japan (and many more). Although the Dalai Lama's pleas proved to be less effective with the passing of time, his office in New York did not cease to lobby several U.N. delegations for the Tibetan cause. Also, the Dalai Lama was aided by a former U.S. delegate to the U.N.

== Criticism ==
In his 1991 autobiography Freedom in Exile, the 14th Dalai Lama criticized the CIA for supporting the Tibetan independence movement "not because they (the CIA) cared about Tibetan independence, but as part of their worldwide efforts to destabilize all communist governments."

In 1999, the Dalai Lama suggested that the CIA Tibetan program had been harmful to Tibet because it primarily served American interests, claiming, "once the American policy toward China changed, they stopped their help ... The Americans had a different agenda from the Tibetans."

Gyalo Thondup, the Dalai Lama's elder brother, also expressed frustration with the CIA's role in Tibetan affairs. In a 2009 interview, he stated, "I never asked for CIA military assistance. I asked for political help. I wanted to publicize the Tibet situation, to make a little noise. The Americans promised to help make Tibet an independent country. All those promises were broken." He continues, claiming that America "didn't want to help Tibet. It just wanted to make trouble for China. It had no far-sighted policy for Tibet. I wasn't trained for this (clandestine operations). We didn't know about power politics."

During the Tibetan program's period of activity, some of its largest contributions to the CIA's interests in the region came in the form of keeping the Chinese occupied with resistance, never actually producing a mass uprising, establishing independence for Tibet from Beijing. The program also produced a trove of army documents that Tibetan insurgents seized from the Chinese and turned over to the CIA in 1961 in what has been referred to as "one of the greatest intelligence successes of the Cold War".

The CIA faced criticism for breaking promises regarding declassification, including some documentation regarding the support of Tibetan guerrilla fighters in the 1950s until the early 1960s.

The CIA itself has expressed a mixed attitude toward its role in Tibet; in an undated retrospective document, the agency reflected: "Weighed against the Tibetans' present bleak prospects, the 25 years of covert action involving their cause seem not to have been worth the investment of lives, money, efforts, and national prestige which it cost the Tibetans, [REDACTED] and our government. Weighed against the whole period and the future, the balance sheet looks more reasonable."

== See also ==
- Protests and uprisings in Tibet since 1950
