= Jampa Tsering =

Chinese singer and dancer

Jampa Tsering (Tibetan: བྱམས་པ་ཚེ་རིང་, Wylie: Byams-pa Tse-ring; Chinese: 强巴次仁; pinyin: Qiángbā Cìrén) was a Chinese singer and dancer. He is of Tibetan ethnicity.

Born in Lhasa in the early 1960s, Jampa Tsering became famous in the late 1980s and early 1990s, releasing an immensely popular album, Gnas mchog gi glu dbyangs (Songs of the Holy Land), including songs such as "Aro Khampa" ("Hey, Khampa"); "Ngai tsewai Lhasa" ("My Beloved Lhasa"); and "Cha chig yinna samchung" ("I Wished, If Only I Was A Bird").

Jampa Tsering studied music in the Shanghai Conservatoire for about seven years, learning piano. He was a member of the Tibet Song-and-Dance Ensemble, but began to gain a following in Lhasa from singing in karaoke and nangma bars. For this and his private singing, he was eventually expelled from the dance troupe. He assimilated much of the style of 1980s Chinese language pop into his singing and the synthesised orchestral accompaniments of his songs. He was clearly a product of the new media rather than traditional Tibetan singing, using a soft crooning voice rather than the loud, projecting voice of traditional Tibetan singing, yet the melodies of the songs he sang inherited a strong Tibetan character, with their wide vocal range and long phrases.

Many of his songs have hidden political meanings, such as "Ri de Himalaya" ("Himalaya Mountains"), and they all express a strong pride in Tibetan identity, Tibetan traditions and the Tibetan countryside. Some of Jampa Tsering's songs were restricted in Lhasa in the late 1980s and early 1990s due to their political nature.

Jampa Tsering died in a car crash in 1997.

== Albums ==
Gnas mchog gi glu dbyangs (Songs of the Holy Land)
