= Lhasa Carpet Factory =

Carpet factory in Lhasa, Tibet, China

Lhasa Carpet Factory (Chinese: 慈德林) is a factory south of Yanhe Dong Lu near the Tibet University in Lhasa, the capital of the Tibet Autonomous Region of the People's Republic of China. It produces traditional Tibetan rugs that are exported worldwide through Canton.

== Sources ==
- Passport Books: Tibet (1986), Shangri-la Press
