= Paca, Tibet =

Human settlement in China

Coordinates: 30°33′N 88°48′E

Paca is a village in the Tibet Autonomous Region of China.

== See also ==
- List of towns and villages in Tibet
