= List of Tibetan-language films =

A list of films produced in Tibetan.

Title	Director	Cast	Genre	Notes
2012
"Dolma" A Tibetan Short Film	Jim Sanjay		Children Film	
1997
Seven Years in Tibet	Jean-Jacques Annaud		Drama	
Kundun	Martin Scorsese		Drama	
1999
The Cup	Khyentse Norbu			
Himalaya	Eric Valli			
2000
Yeshe Dolma	Fei Xie		Drama	
2001
Samsara		Nalin Pan		
2003
Travelers and Magicians	Khyentse Norbu			
2004
Kekexili: Mountain Patrol	Lu Chuan			
2005
Dreaming Lhasa	Ritu Sarin and Tenzing Sonam			
2006
Milarepa	Neten Chokling	Gimyan Lodro	Drama	
2007
Metse	Sonam Wangdue		Indian documentary on Tibetan exiles.	
Fate of the Lhapa	Sarah Sifers		Documentary	
