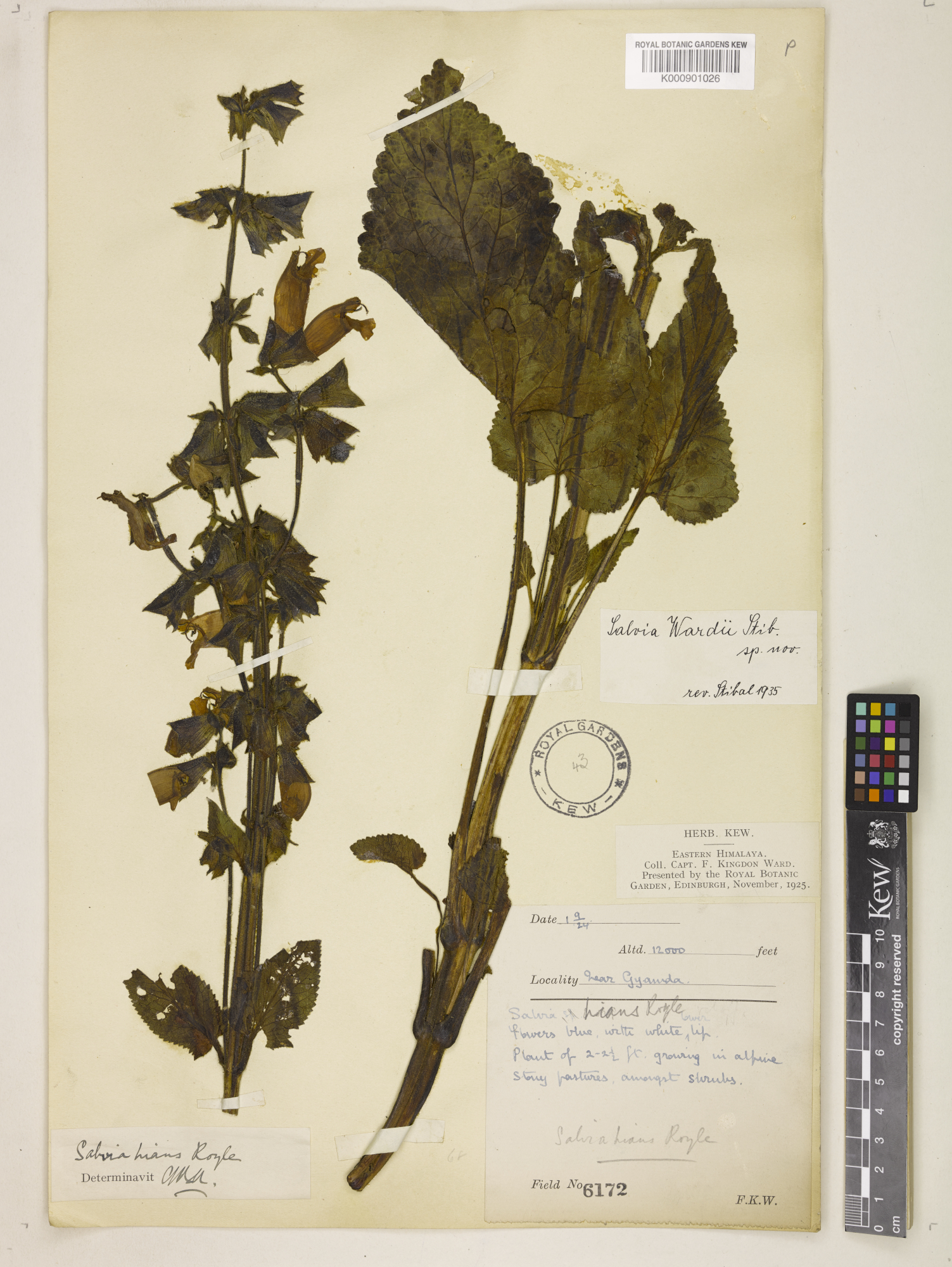

Scientific classification
- Kingdom: Plantae
- Clade: Tracheophytes
- Clade: Angiosperms
- Clade: Eudicots
- Clade: Asterids
- Order: Lamiales
- Family: Lamiaceae
- Genus: Salvia
- Species: S. wardii

Binomial name
- Salvia wardii E. Peter

= Salvia wardii =

Species of flowering plant

Salvia wardii (Tibetan sage) is a perennial plant that is native to Tibet, found growing in alpine grasslands and thickets at 3,600 to 4,500 m (11,800 to 14,800 ft) elevation. It grows 50 to 75 cm (20 to 30 in) high, on strong stems that are glandular and hairy, forming into a thick spreading plant. It has many basal leaves that are ovate to subhastate, 7 to 16 cm (2.8 to 6.3 in) long and 3.5 to 8 cm (1.4 to 3.1 in) wide. The upper leaf is slightly ridged with short hairs, the underside has red glandular hairs, especially dense on the veins.

The 3.5 to 4 cm (1.4 to 1.6 in) corolla is blue with white on the lower lip, held in a purple tinged calyx, growing on terminal panicles or racemes.
