= Tashi Dondrup =

Tashi Dondrup is Chinese singer and mandolin player. The 30-year-old musician is particularly popular in his native Tibet. He is the son of Tibetan farmers and was married in 2009.

== Biography ==
Dondrup released a CD called "Torture Without Trace," in December 2009. It contains thirteen songs telling of nostalgia for the exiled 14th Dalai Lama, and remembering the crackdown that followed the 2008 Lhasa violence. The 5,000 CDs produced were sold out quickly among Tibetans in the Amdo region of eastern Tibet, where he is a local star. Authorities immediately banned the CD. He was detained by government authorities in December 2009, in Xining, the capital of Qinghai province, where he had gone into hiding. He had a record of arrest from 2008 to March 2009 from a previous CD.
