= Tasam =

Portable Homes for Nomads/Traders

Tasam is a Tibetan term which refers to a nomadic caravan house which is not only used for living in but is used for the exchange of commodities and bargaining in markets in Tibet.
