= Lumajangdong Co =

Lake in Tibet, China

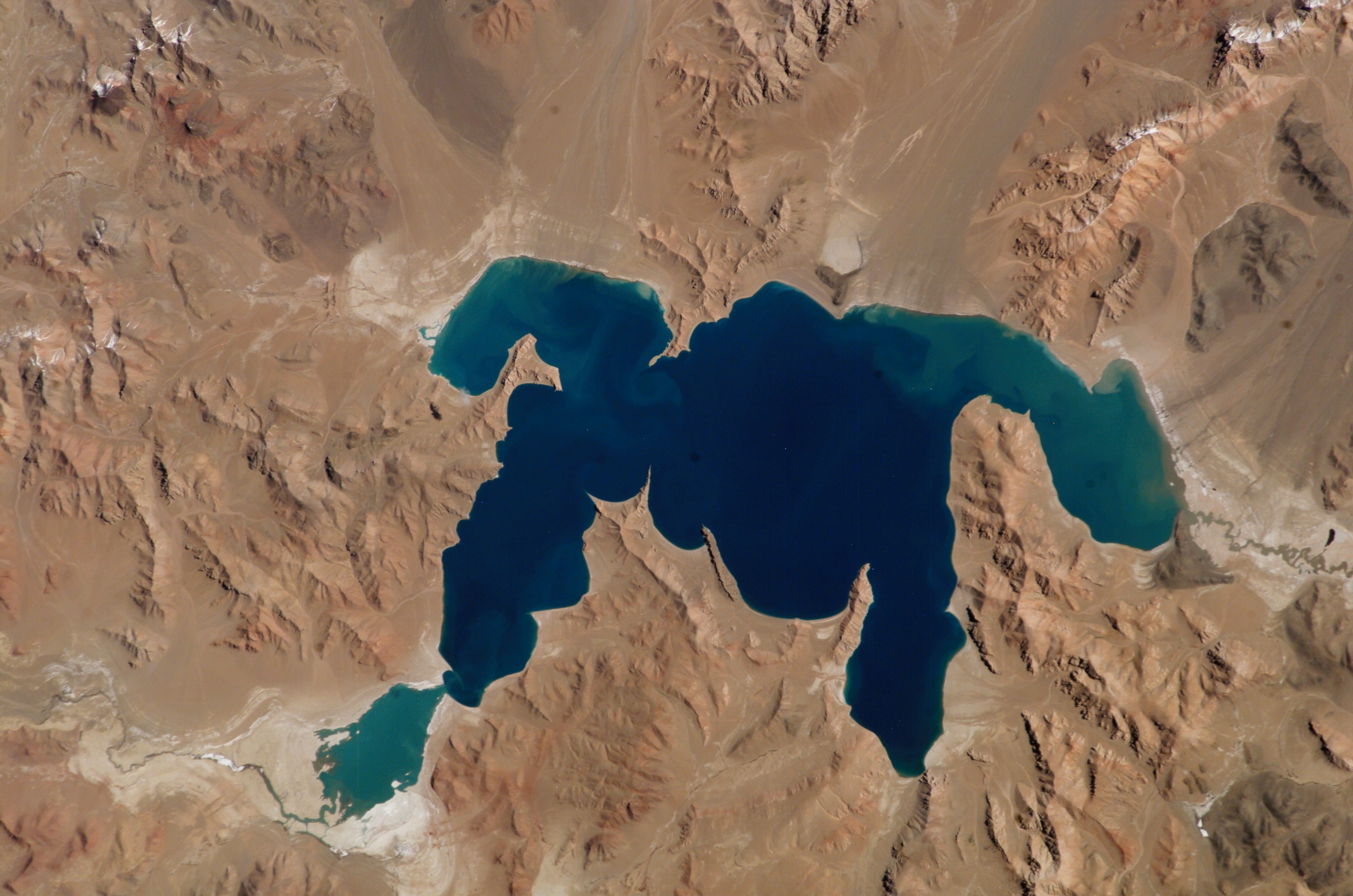
- View of lake taken during ISS Expedition 13

- Location within Ngari
- Coordinates: 34°00′N 81°37′E
- Basin countries: China
- Surface area: 250 km^{2} (97 sq mi)

Lumajangdong Co (Tibetan: ལུ་མ་བྱང་སྟོང་མཚོ, Wylie: lu ma byang stong mtsho; Chinese: 鲁玛江东错; pinyin: Lǔmǎjiāngdōng Cuò) is a lake in the Ngari Prefecture, Tibet, China with an area of 250 km^{2}. It is located at 34° 2' 0" and 81° 40' 0". Gormain lies a few miles (5–7 km) to the northwest.

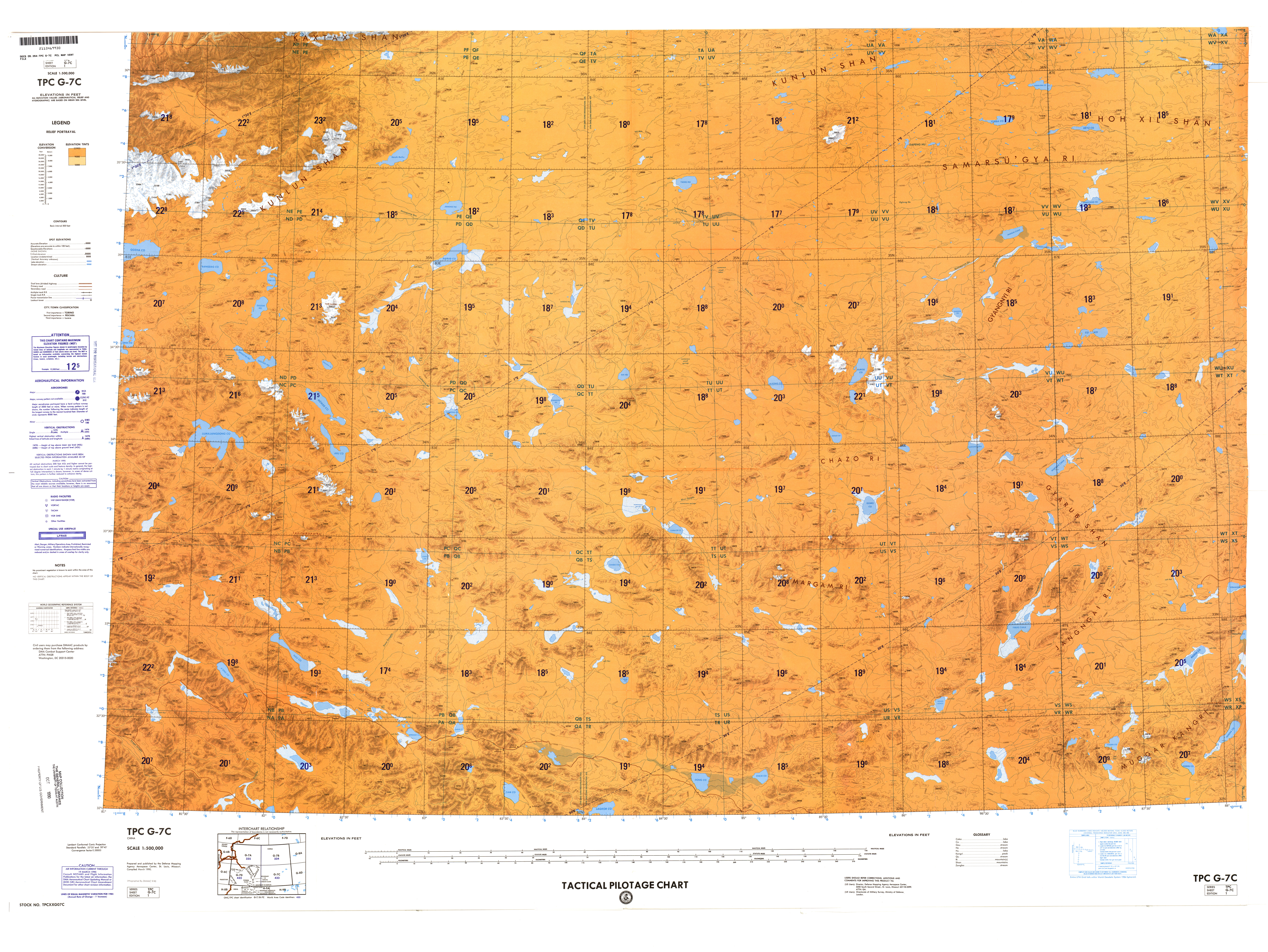
Map including Lumajangdong Co
