= Tibet Vernacular Paper =

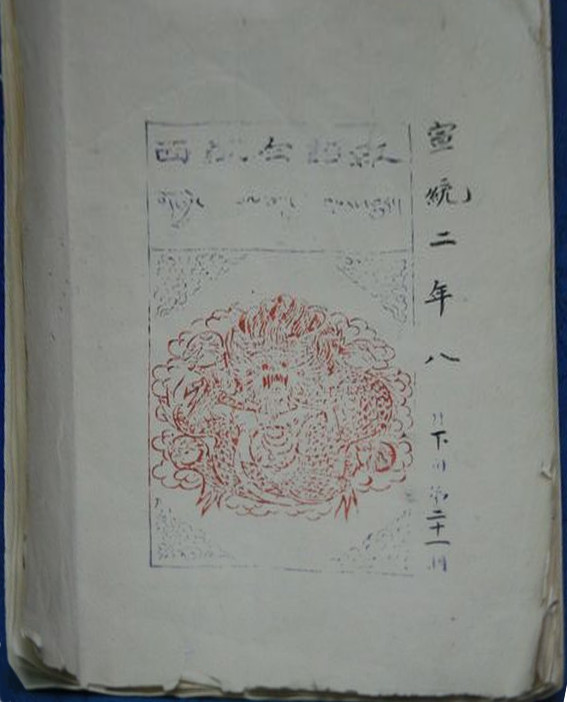
Front cover of August 1910 21 issue in Chinese and Tibetan

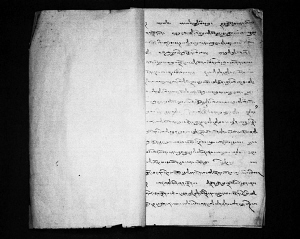
Page of the Paper in Tibetan

The Tibet Vernacular News (simplified Chinese: 西藏白话报; traditional Chinese: 西藏白話報; pinyin: Xīzàng báihuà bào, Tibetan: བོད་ཀྱི་ཕལ་སྐད་གསར་འགྱུར་, Wylie: bod kyi phal skad gsar 'gyur), also translated as The Tibetan Vernacular News, is the first newspaper to have been established in Tibet. Besides a Chinese title and some subscription information, the newspaper was written in Tibetan (藏文) since its founding in April 1907 by amban Lian Yu 聯豫 (in office 1906–1912), and his deputy Zhang Yintang 張蔭堂 (in office 1906–1908), in the final years of the Qing dynasty. The first issue was lithographically printed, with a print-run fewer than 100 copies a day. It was disestablished in 1911. The mission of the newspaper was mainly educational, but also propagandistic. Nothing is known about how the paper was received by Tibetans.

== Goals ==
Lian Yu and Zhang Yintang felt that publishing a newspaper in the vernacular language would advance their administrative reforms far more than just making speeches to restricted audiences. They took the Sichuan Yun Bao and other government-funded newspapersd as its models. As few Tibetans could read Chinese and few Chinese could read Tibetan at the time, they plumped for a bilingual newspaper. According to Bai Runsheng, the newspaper was warmly welcomed by the Tibetan people.

== Printing, circulation and frequency ==
The Tibet Vernacular Paper was first printed lithographically (at the rate of fewer than 100 copies a day) on a stone printing machine brought to Tibet by Zhang Yintang. In order to achieve larger print runs, printing machines were later bought in India and brought to Tibet. The newspaper appeared once every ten days, with 300 to 400 copies per issue. It stopped appearing in 1911.

== Announcing the arrival of Zhao Erfeng army ==
The paper announced in August 1908 the arrival of Chao Erh-feng army: "Don't be afraid of Amban Chao and his soldiers. They are not intended to do harm to Tibetans, but to other people. If you consider, you will remember how you felt ashamed when the foreign soldiers arrived in Lhasa and oppressed you with much tyranny. We must all be strengthen ourselves on this account, otherwise our religion will be destroyed in 100 or perhaps 1,000 years."

== See also ==
- (in French) Bai Runsheng, Abrégé de l’histoire de (la) presse chinoise, Éditions de Chine Nouvelle, 1998
- The Tibet Mirror
- Erhard, F.X. and H. Hou 2018. "The Melong in Context. A Survey of the Earliest Tibetan Language Newspapers 1904–1960." In F. Wang-Toutain and M. Preziosi (eds.) Cahiers du Mirror, 1–40. Paris: Collège de France.
- The 1910 issue is reproduced in full in: Yan, Z., Jiang, C., Zheng, W., and Zla ba tshe ring 2000. Precious deposits: Historical Relics of Tibet, China. 5 vols. Beijing: Morning Glory Publishers, vol. 5, pp. 23–26.
