= Chowa, Tibet =

Village in the Tibet Autonomous Region of China

Coordinates: 31°10′N 87°35′E

Chowa is a village in the Tibet Autonomous Region of China. It lies at an altitude of 4820 metres (15,816 feet). The village has a population of about 28.

== See also ==
- List of towns and villages in Tibet
