= 16-Article Code =

Former legal code in Tibet

The 16-Article Code was created in the early 17th century and effective in Tibet until 1959. It was created during the Garma (or Karmapa) regime, it covers military, civil and administrative affairs, also degrees of punishment. The code that was drafted was based on the 15-Article Code. Along with the 15-Article Code, people of old Tibet were divided into 3 classes and 9 ranks.
