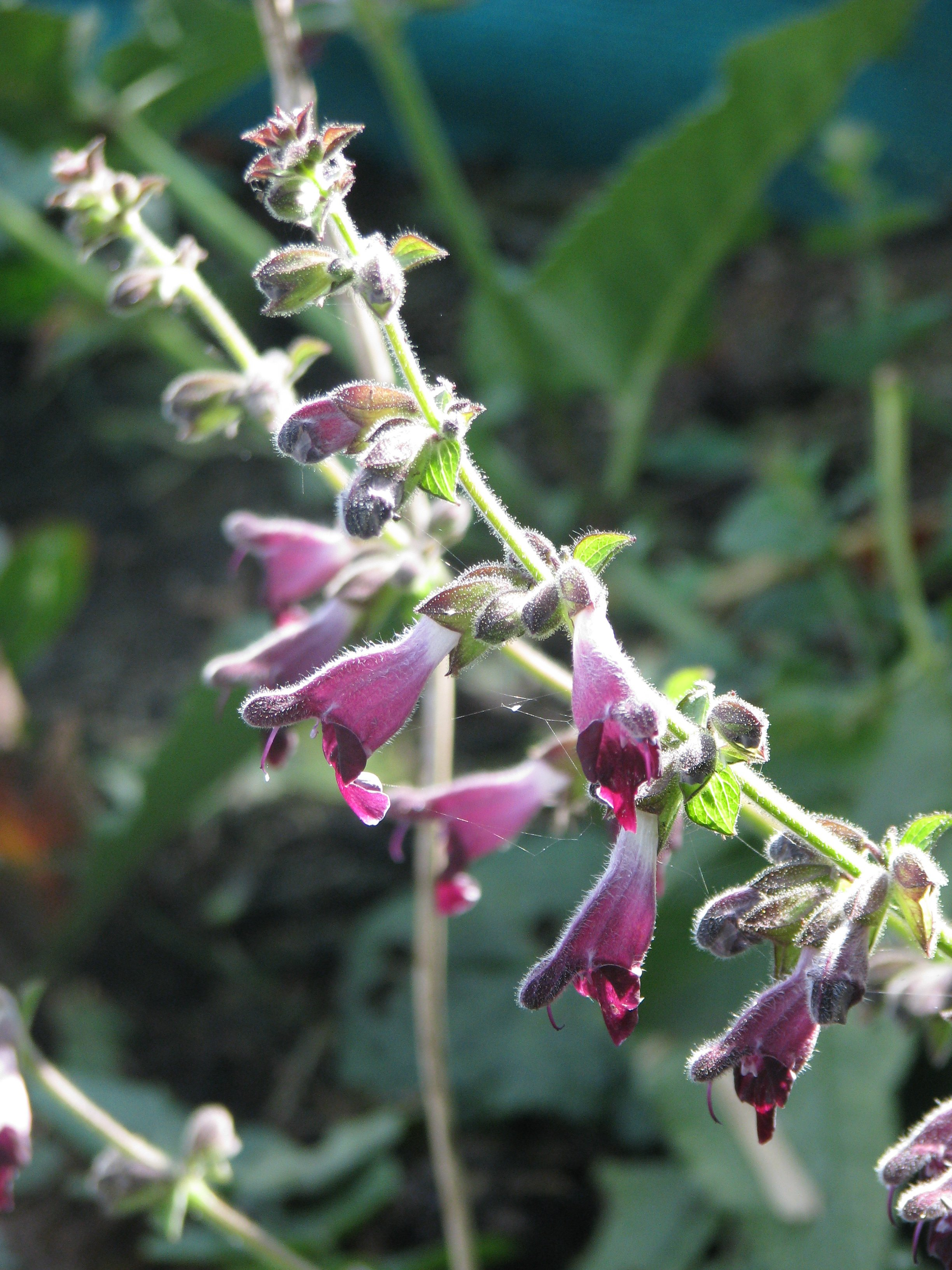

Scientific classification
- Kingdom: Plantae
- Clade: Tracheophytes
- Clade: Angiosperms
- Clade: Eudicots
- Clade: Asterids
- Order: Lamiales
- Family: Lamiaceae
- Genus: Salvia
- Species: S. castanea

Binomial name
- Salvia castanea Diels

= Salvia castanea =

Species of flowering plant

Salvia castanea is a herbaceous perennial plant discovered in the Yunnan Valley in China in 1904 by plant collector George Forrest. It also grows in Nepal, Bhutan, and Tibet. The plants used in horticulture today likely came from seed collected from a plant at 14,000 ft in Nepal, at the base of Mt. Everest. It grows 3 ft tall in the wild, and 1–2 feet in cultivation in Europe and the U.S. The few 1.0–1.5 in flowers grow in whorls on an inflorescence about 1 ft long. The name castanea, which means 'chestnut colored', refers to the purplish-maroon flowers
