= Li-kuo Fu =

Professor Li-kuo Fu (or Li Kuo Fu) (born 1934) worked for the Institute of Botany at the Chinese Academy of Sciences, Beijing. He is the author of several treatises on Chinese plants, notably the China Red Data Book of rare and endangered species in the 1990s. In 1973, he took part in the Qinghai - Tibet Expedition, during which he discovered and named the Tibetan elm, Ulmus microcarpa.

== Publications ==
- Ulmaceae, (co-authors Xin, Y. & Whittemore, A.) in Wu, Z. & Raven, P. Eds. Flora of China, Vol. 5 (Ulmaceae through Basellaceae), (2002), Science Press, Beijing, and Missouri Botanical Garden Press, St. Louis, USA.
