= Project AQUILINE =

CIA reconnaissance program

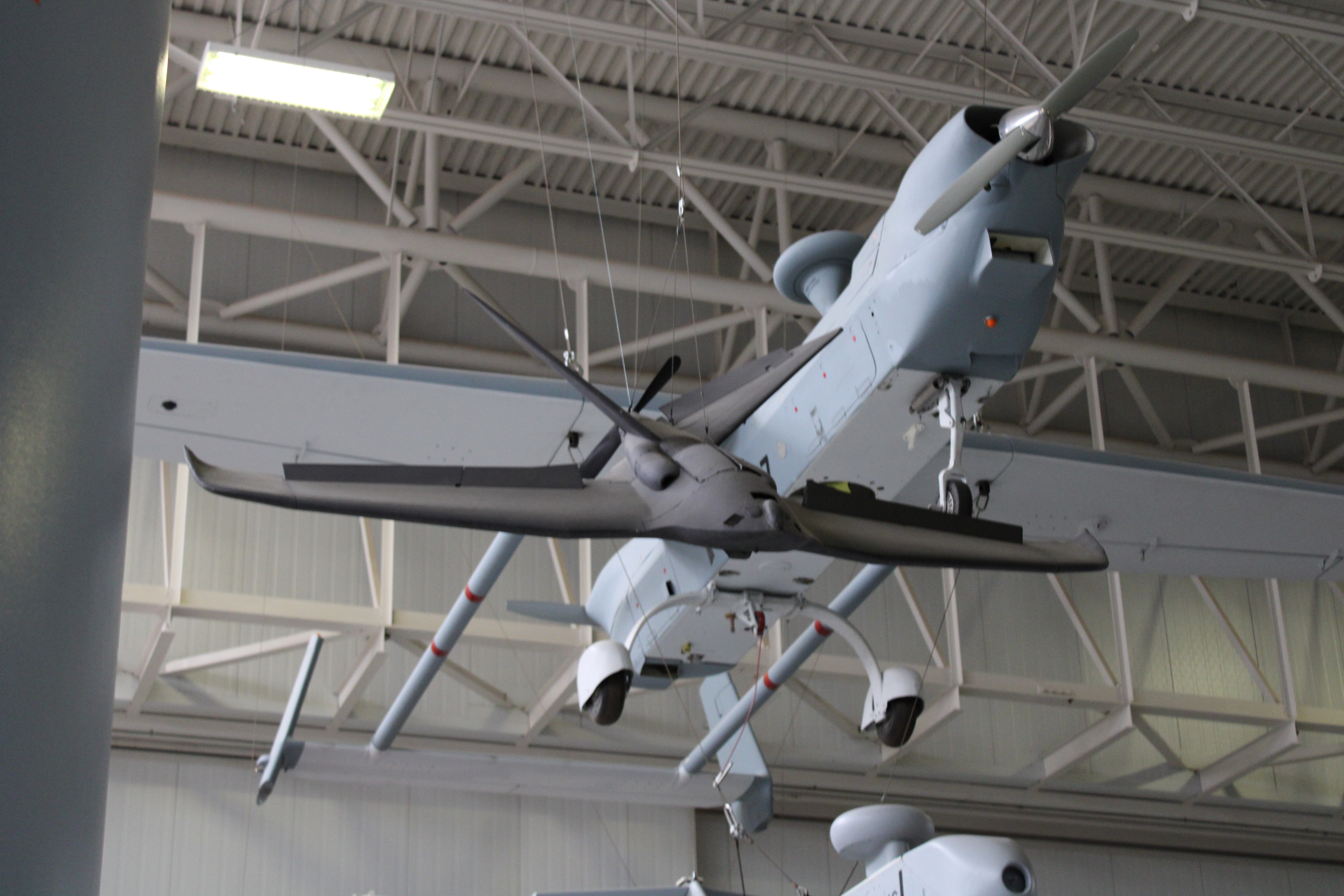
McDonnell Douglas Aquiline (incorrectly identified as a "Mark II Batwing") displayed inverted at the United States Army Aviation Museum.

Project AQUILINE was a secret 1960s CIA program to develop an unmanned aerial reconnaissance vehicle. In mid-1965 the CIA's Office of Research and Development's Applied Physics Division began work on the vehicle. It would be about the size of a large bird and carry various payloads, including photographic equipment, nuclear sensors, and ELINT recorders. A Special Projects Group was formed and an RFP was sent out. Douglas Aircraft was the only respondent and received a study contract on November 15, 1965. This was followed by two more contracts on November 21, 1966 and more in 1968 and 1969 for a "low-altitude intelligence-gathering system".

== History ==
In the early 1960s, there were many problems surveilling hostile territory. The Lockheed U-2 was too vulnerable to Soviet surface-to-air missiles, and the OXCART was still under development (it was expected that it might prove vulnerable to Soviet radars and missiles anyway). While safe from interception, new photosatellites could not be quickly directed to provide coverage of a specific target. Since targets like Cuba and the Soviet radar installation at Tallinn, Estonia were not too deep in hostile territory, and with recent advances in electronics miniaturization, the CIA considered the use of small, unmanned aerial reconnaissance vehicles to fill the need. The aircraft would need to have a very-low radar cross-section and small visual and acoustical signatures, allowing it to reconnoiter an area of interest without the target's knowledge.

In mid-1965 the CIA's Office of Research and Development's Applied Physics Division began work on the vehicle. It would be about the size of a large bird and carry various payloads, including photographic equipment, nuclear sensors, and ELINT recorders. A Special Projects Group was formed and an RFP was sent out. Douglas Aircraft was the only respondent and received a study contract on November 15, 1965. This was followed by two more contracts on November 21, 1966 and more in 1968 and 1969 for a "low-altitude intelligence-gathering system".

The first AQUILINE prototype was a powered glider with an 8.5-foot (2.6 m) wingspan, powered by a tail-mounted 3.5 horsepower (2.6 kW) McCulloch two-cycle chainsaw motor. It weighed 105 pounds (48 kg). It may have been made to resemble a large bird (aquiline means "eagle-like").

In 1968 testing of the aircraft at Naval Air Weapons Station China Lake, it proved difficult to see by the chase aircraft – a problem only partially solved by painting AQUILINE's top surface bright orange.

Because the aircraft had to be recovered by flying it into a net, there was almost always damage to its propellers, wings, etc. Three of the five prototypes were destroyed in testing. Still, the project was considered ready to advance to operational testing at the Office of Special Activities where it successfully demonstrated a 130-mile (210 km) range and very-high-resolution photography, meeting the 1967 specifications. However, improvement of the aircraft into a practical long-range reconnaissance system was estimated to cost another US$35 million and take two to three years. On the recommendation of CIA DDS&T (Deputy Directory for Science and Technology) Carl Duckett, the project was cancelled on November 1, 1971.

== Secrecy ==
Most of what is known about AQUILINE was revealed in 2013 with the declassification of the 1992 Central Intelligence Agency and Overhead Reconnaissance: The U-2 and OXCART Programs, 1954–1974. However, British U-2 historian Chris Pocock wrote in 2011 about it based on two open source accounts and interviews he conducted.

Pocock reports that the aircraft tested at Groom Lake was designed to fly at an altitude of 500–1,000 feet (150–300 m) for 3,000 miles (4,800 km) on 100 pounds (45 kg) of fuel. For navigation, a video camera in the nose relayed ground imagery back to a control station where an operator would compare it with satellite imagery. The vehicle was flown into a net on return to base where images could then be recovered from the main 35mm film camera.

The CIA declassified a series of documents about the project.
