= Education in Tibet =

Education in Tibet is the public responsibility of the Ministry of Education of the People's Republic of China. Education of ethnic Tibetans is partly subsidized by the government. Primary and secondary education is compulsory, while preferential policies aimed at Tibetans seek to enroll more students in vocational or higher education.

== History ==
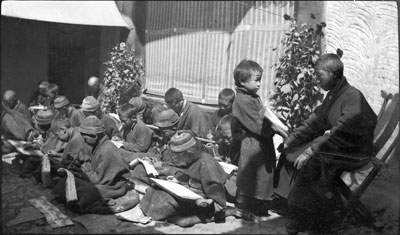
Lhasa (1922)

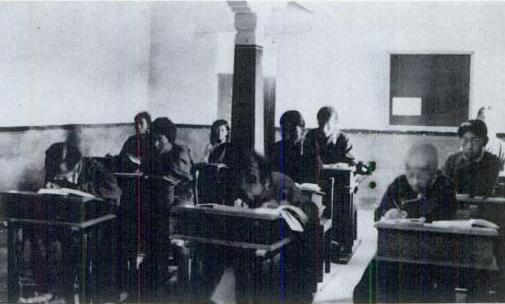
English school in Gyantse, classroom photo between 1923 and 1926

Some form of institutionalized education was in place in Tibet since 860 CE, when the first monasteries were established. However, only 13% of the population (less for girls) lived there, and many still were manual laborers educated only enough to chant their prayer books. Five public schools existed outside of the monasteries: Tse Laptra trained boys for ecclesiastical functions in the government, Tsikhang to prepare aristocrats with the proper etiquette for government service. Some villages have small private schools. Some choose to educate their children with private tutors at home. In the 20th century, the government in Tibet allowed foreign groups, mainly English, to establish secular schools in Lhasa. However, they were opposed by the clergy and the aristocracy, who feared they would "undermine Tibet's cultural and religious traditions." The parents who could afford to send their children to England for education were reluctant because of the distance. The Seventeen Point Agreement signed at that time pledged Chinese help to develop education in Tibet. Primary education has been expanded in recent decades.

== Overview ==
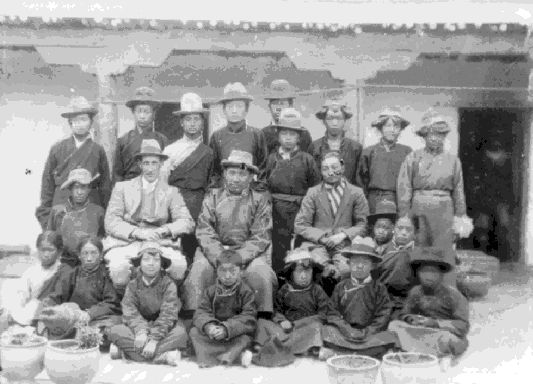
Frank Ludlow with Tibetan pupils between 1923 and 1926

According to state-owned newspaper China Daily in 2015, the literacy rate in Tibet for the 15-60 age group was 99.48%.

According to the government-run China Association for Preservation and Development of Tibetan Culture, since the China Western Development program in 1999, 200 primary schools have been built, and enrollment of children in public schools in 2010 has reached 98.8%.

In 2017 there were 2,200 schools across Tibet providing different levels of education to roughly 663,000 students. According to a 2019 Chinese government white paper, in 2018 the net enrollment rate in Tibet was 99.5% in primary school, while gross enrollment rates were 99.5% in middle school, 82.3% in senior high school and 39.2% in colleges and universities. China education policy in the Tibet Autonomous Region (TAR) is significantly reducing the access of ethnic Tibetans to education in their mother tongue.

=== Bilingual Education ===
In much of Tibet, primary school education is conducted either primarily or entirely in Standard Tibetan. In middle schools, classes are taught in both Tibetan and Mandarin Chinese. As of 2012, 96.88% of all primary school students and 90.63% of all middle school students had received bilingual education.

The Free Tibet campaign and other Tibetan human rights groups have criticised the education system in Tibet for eroding Tibetan culture. There have been protests against the teaching of Mandarin Chinese in schools and the lack of more instruction on local history and culture. The International Campaign for Tibet accused Chinese authorities of "marginalizing the Tibetan language by withdrawing it from the curriculum".

According to Professor Barry Sautman, writing in the Texas Journal of International Law:

"None of the many recent studies of endangered languages deems Tibetan to be imperiled, and language maintenance among Tibetans contrasts with language loss even in the remote areas of Western states renowned for liberal policies...Claims that primary schools in Tibet teach Mandarin are in error. Tibetan was the main language of instruction in 98% of TAR primary schools in 1996...In six years of Tibetan primary school, pupils are said to spend a total of 1598 hours studying in Tibetan and 748 hours studying in Chinese, a two-to-one ratio. Because less than four out of ten TAR Tibetans reach secondary school, primary school matters most for their cultural formation."

Tibetologist Elliot Sperling has noted that "within certain limits the PRC does make efforts to accommodate Tibetan cultural expression" and "the cultural activity taking place all over the Tibetan plateau cannot be ignored."

=== Vocational training and reeducation ===
In addition to vocational training programs for school aged students the Chinese government also operates a series of adult vocational training centers. This program seeks to redistribute “surplus” rural herders and farmers to manufacturers looking for labor. The campaign aims to reform “backward thinking” and “stop raising up lazy people.” According to Adrian Zenz, who works at the Victims of Communism Memorial Foundation, the vocational training is militarized and overseen by current and former PLA members.

== Higher education ==
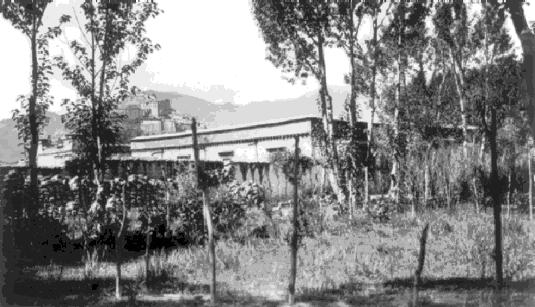
English School in Gyantse between 1923 and 1926

According to the Chinese government the central government held the Second National Conference on Work in Tibet in 1984, and Tibet University was established in 1985. Tibet had six institutes of higher learning as of 2006. When the National Higher Education Entrance Examination was first established in 1980, ethnic Tibetans filled only 10% of the higher education entrant quota for the region, despite making up 97% of the region's population. However, in 1984, the Chinese Ministry of Education affected policy changes including affirmative action and Tibetan language accommodations. In 2008, the number of ethnic Tibetans sitting the National College Entrance Examination (NCEE) reached 14248, with 10211 being accepted into university, making the enrollment proportion of ethnic Tibetans 60%.

== See also ==
- Tibetan Children's Villages
- Education in the People's Republic of China
