= Neolithic Tibet =

Period of Tibetan prehistory

Neolithic Tibet refers to a prehistoric period in which Neolithic technology was present in Tibet.

Tibet has been inhabited since the Late Paleolithic. Paleolithic inhabitants successfully overcame the extremely harsh climate and environments and made some genetic contribution to the contemporary inhabitants. Excavated microliths on the Tibetan Plateau display mosaic features of both northern Chinese tool culture and the Tibetan Paleoliths. During the mid-Holocene, Neolithic immigrants from northern China mixed with the original inhabitants, although a degree of genetic continuity with the Paleolithic settlers still exists.

== Migration ==
There is some genetic continuity between the initial Paleolithic inhabitants and the modern populations on the Tibetan Plateau. Genetic studies suggest that Epipaleolithic and Neolithic immigrants from northern China moved to the Tibetan plateau during the mid-Holocene. Various models for how and why the migrations occurred have been proposed, although additional research is necessary to verify the different models.

== Archaeological sites ==
Evidence of Neolithic Tibetan inhabitants and settlements have been found mainly "in river valleys in the south and east of the country". Archaeological sites consist of those in Nyingchi County, Medog County, and Qamdo County. Archaeologists have found pottery and stone tools, including stone axes, chisels, knives, spindle-whorls, discs, and arrowheads. Findings in Nyingchi culturally resemble the Neolithic Qijia culture in Gansu and Qinghai, while findings in Qamdo resemble the Dadunzi site in Yunnan, although there may be some connections with the Neolithic culture of the Yellow River valley.
