= Freedom in Exile =

1991 autobiography of Tenzin Gyatso

- Author: 14th Dalai Lama
- Language: English
- Genre: Autobiography
- Publisher: Harper San Francisco
- Publication date: 1991
- Media type: Print
- Preceded by: My Life and My People

Freedom in Exile: The Autobiography of the Dalai Lama is the second autobiography of the 14th Dalai Lama, released in 1991. The Dalai Lama's first autobiography, My Land and My People, was published in 1962, a few years after he reestablished himself in India and before he became an international celebrity. He regards both of the autobiographies as authentic and re-issued My Land and My People in 1997 to coincide with the release of the film Kundun.

== Background ==
In the introduction, the Dalai Lama explains that he wrote the book "to counter Chinese claims and misinformation" about the history of Tibet. The title "Freedom in exile" refers to the freedoms he says that India offers to him.

The idea for a second autobiography came from a British journalist, Alexander Norman, in the 1980s, who sat and taped the Dalai Lama for "several hours at a time" and wrote the book out of the manuscripts.

== Synopsis ==
The autobiography starts with the Dalai Lama's "birth to a family of small farmers", selection as the Dalai Lama, tumultuous relationship with the People's Republic of China (in which he claims many atrocities), and subsequent life in India. The book acknowledges "the cultural gaps between traditional Tibetan Buddhism and the scientific approaches of the West", and also elucidates the points of similarity between the two.

The autobiography also criticizes the U.S. Central Intelligence Agency (CIA) for supporting the Tibetan independence movement "not because they (the CIA) cared about Tibetan independence, but as part of their worldwide efforts to destabilize all communist governments".

== Reception ==
Freedom in Exile was timed to be released around the anti-Communist Revolutions of 1989, and the Dalai Lama's winning of the 1989 Nobel Peace Prize. The book was generally well-received in the West. In a review, Rembert Weakland called the book "a call for freedom".
