= Contemporary Tibetan art =

Contemporary Tibetan art refers to the art of modern Tibet, or Tibet after 1950. It also refer to art by the Tibetan diaspora, which is explicitly political, religious and personal in nature. Contemporary Tibetan art goes beyond Thanka paintings. Often dealing with complex sociopolitical realities.
