= Tibetan rug =

Type of rug or carpet woven in Tibet

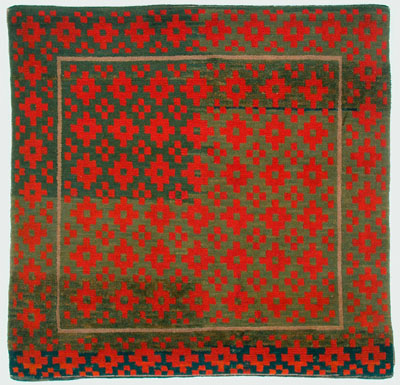
A small Tibetan sitting rug with traditional Gau (amulet) design, representative of the designs that are believed to be amongst the oldest on Tibetan carpets

Tibetan rug making is an ancient, traditional craft. Tibetan rugs are traditionally made from Tibetan highland sheep's wool, called changpel. Tibetans use rugs for many purposes ranging from flooring to wall hanging to horse saddles, though the most common use is as a seating carpet. A typical sleeping carpet measuring around 3 ft × 5 ft (0.91 m × 1.52 m) is called a khaden.

The knotting method used in Tibetan rug making is different from that used in other rug making traditions worldwide. Some aspects of the rug making have been supplanted by cheaper machines in recent times, especially yarn spinning and trimming of the pile after weaving. However, some carpets are still made by hand. The Tibetan diaspora in India and Nepal have established a thriving business in rug making. In Nepal the rug business is one of the largest industries in the country and there are many rug exporters. Tibet also has weaving workshops, but the export side of the industry is relatively undeveloped compared with Nepal and India.

== History ==
The carpet-making industry in Tibet boasts a history spanning over a thousand years. Yet considered as a lowly craft, it was not mentioned in early writings, aside from occasional references to the rugs owned by prominent religious figures. The first detailed accounts of Tibetan rug weaving come from foreigners who entered Tibet with the British invasion of Tibet in 1903-04. Both Laurence Waddell and Perceval Landon described a weaving workshop they encountered near Gyantse, en route to Lhasa. Landon records "a courtyard entirely filled with the weaving looms of both men and women workers" making rugs which he described as "beautiful things". The workshop was owned and run by one of the local aristocratic families, which was the norm in pre-modern Tibet. Many simpler weavings for domestic use were made at home, but dedicated workshops made decorated pile rugs that were sold to wealthy families in Lhasa and Shigatse, and monasteries. The monastic institutions housed thousands of monks, who sat on long, low platforms during religious ceremonies, that were nearly always covered in hand-woven carpets for comfort. Wealthier monasteries replaced these carpets regularly, providing income, or taking gifts in lieu of taxation, from hundreds or thousands of weavers.

From its heyday in the 19th and early 20th century, the Tibetan carpet industry fell into serious decline in the second half of the 20th. The Chinese invasion of Tibet that began in 1959 was later exacerbated by land collectivization that enabled rural people to obtain a livelihood without weaving, and reduced the power of the landholding monasteries. Many of the aristocratic families who formerly participated in the weaving industry fled to India and Nepal during this period, along with their money and management expertise.

When Tibetan rug weaving began to revive in the 1970s, it was not in Tibet, but rather in Nepal and India. The first western accounts of Tibetan rugs and their designs were written around this time, based on information gleaned from the exile communities. Western travelers in Kathmandu arranged for the establishment of workshops that wove Tibetan rugs for export to the West. Weaving in the Nepal and India carpet workshops was eventually dominated by local non-Tibetan workers, who replaced the original Tibetan émigré weavers. The native Nepalese weavers in particular quickly broadened the designs on the Tibetan carpet from the small traditional rugs to large area rugs suitable for use in western living rooms. This began a carpet industry that is important to the Nepalese economy even to this day, even though its reputation was eventually tarnished by child labor scandals during the 1990s.

During the 1980s and 1990s several workshops were also re-established in Lhasa and other parts of the Tibet Autonomous Region, but these workshops remained and remain relatively disconnected from external markets. Today, most carpets woven in Lhasa factories are destined for the tourist market or for use as gifts to visiting Chinese delegations and government departments. Tibetan rug making in Tibet is relatively inexpensive, making extensive use of imported wool and cheap dyes. Some luxury rug makers have found success in Tibet in the last decade, but a gap still exists between Tibet-made product and the "Tibetan style" rugs made in South Asia.

== Design ==
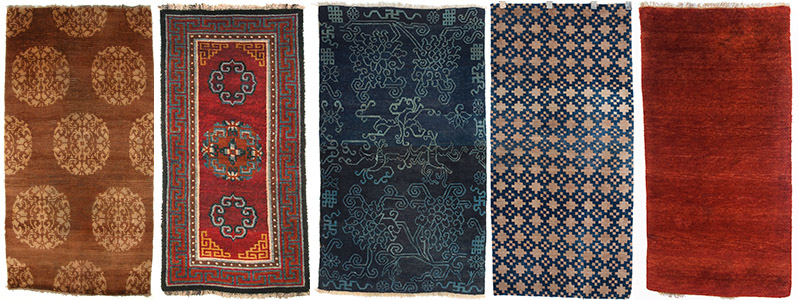
Tibetan khaden (sleeping rugs) with designs typical of 19th century weavings

Tibetan carpets from the 19th century (perhaps earlier, though mostly carpets from the 19th century survive) are relatively restrained in terms of design and coloring, carpet makers at that time being restricted to a narrow range of natural dyes including madder (red), indigo (blue), Tibetan rhubarb (yellow) and Tibetan walnut (browns and greys), with a few other local plants producing yellow and greenish colors. Motifs consisted of two classes: the first type being simple geometric motifs such as the checkerboard and gau (amulet) design that probably formed part of an ancient Tibetan design repertoire, mingled with medallion designs and other motifs derived from Chinese decorative traditions.

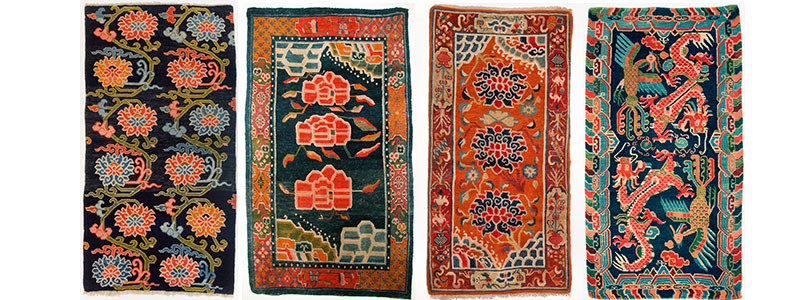
Tibetan khaden with designs from the early part of the 20th century showing the greater elaboration and wider color range from this period

From the early 1900s a wider range of synthetic colors became available to Tibetan weavers, and this seems to have stimulated the production of new and more complex designs, also based loosely on traditional Chinese motifs. The period of 1900-1950 saw the production of many colorful new designs featuring dragons, phoenix, floral motifs, clouds and so on. Though the main influence was Chinese, Western textile designs were also copied occasionally. These designs still form the core of the Tibetan weaver's repertoire today.

== Tiger rugs ==
A Tibetan tiger rug (modern) with and abstract pelt design. Rugs like this were used as meditation seats when tiger skins were unavailable

The interest of western collectors of Tibetan rugs was particularly piqued by tiger rugs, in part because of their associations with Tantric meditation; many Tibetan tiger rugs were gifts for lamas in the monasteries.

There are several kinds of Tibetan tiger rug designs. Some consist of "realistic" renderings of tiger pelts, while closely related rugs show more abstracted versions of tiger stripes. Another type of tiger rug shows a "whole pelt", complete with legs and grinning face.

In a religious context, tiger rugs are related to the tiger skin loin cloths seen in painted images of fierce (wrathful) Tibetan Buddhist gods. The tiger skin is believed to provide protection to a person engaged in meditation. Female wrathful gods sport snow leopard spot loin cloths, and old Tibetan rugs are occasionally found with leopard spots too.

Tiger design rugs are found in several other carpet cultures, including Khotan rugs to the north, however it is amongst Tibetan weavers that these designs achieve their highest development. The designs are lively and amongst the most original of all traditional Tibetan motifs.

== Wangden rugs ==
The term, "Wangden" is a marketplace term referring to a group of rugs of similar structure (a warp faced back weave). But given the wildly different palettes seen in these rugs, it is doubtful they could all originate from the small village of Wangden, located in south/central Tibet. A Tibetan Wangden sitting rug from the late 19th or early part of the 20th century. The red coloring and red fringe indicate that this rug was used in a monastic setting, probably by a senior lama since junior monks rarely owned such pieces

Many Wangden rugs have a looser weave, lower knot count, and a thicker pile than a typical Tibetan carpet, and also sport a thick shaggy fringe. Today these rugs are woven only in the Wangden valley, in the region south of Shigatse, though their manufacture may have been more widespread at one time.

This type of rug was originally made for monastic use as a sitting carpet. Some monasteries still have long Wangden runners on the bench seats used by monks during ceremonies. New rugs are still being woven, though mainly for domestic use and for the visitor market in Lhasa.

The Wangden rug has also been reinterpreted in a contemporary way by Bartoli Design for the Nodus collections.

== Present Day Production in Tibet ==
In Lhasa, rug stores cater to both to local, national, and international tourists. Dark red Turkish imitations from factories in Qinghai are sold alongside other Chinese rugs and even silk carpets with Middle-eastern designs. Amongst local Tibetans, replicas of traditional Tibetan designs from machine-woven polyester are popular inexpensive alternatives to hand-made carpets.

Government-sponsored workshops target the tourist and "official delegation gift" markets, but the wools have short staples and make carpets that are more likely to shed fluff and become matted after cleaning. A popular design is the "Potala" rug, featuring a picture of the Potala Palace and intended to be hung on the wall. Carpet workshops founded by foreigners use wool with longer staple lengths and high lanolin content, which make for a stronger content, but are much more expensive, and have not found much success. However, as an economic activity, Tibetan rug making provides valuable cash income for rural communities who weave in the winter months. Several overseas investors and NGOs are trying to encourage a revival of high quality local wool and natural dyes in Tibetan rug making.

== See also ==
- Bhutanese textiles
- Kashmiri rug
- Sichuan embroidery
