= Mirror of News =

Tibetan News

- Type: Monthly newspaper
- Owner: Gergan Dorje Tharchin
- Founded: 1925; 101 years ago
- Political alignment: Anti-communist
- Headquarters: Kalimpong, India

The Mirror of News (Tibetan: ཡུལ་ཕྱོགས་སོ་སོའི་གསར་འགྱུར་མེ་ལོང, Wylie: yul phyogs so so'i gsar 'gyur gyi me long, ZWPY: Yulchog Soseu Sargyour Mélong) or Mirror of News from All Sides of the World was a Tibetan-language newspaper published in Kalimpong, India, from 1925 to 1963 and circulated primarily in Tibet. Its founder was Gergan Tharchin who was also its journalist, editor, and manager.

== History ==
=== Creation and founder ===
In 1925 the Tibetan language Mirror of News was founded at Kalimpong in West Bengal, India. Published after The Ladakh Journal (Ladakh Kyi Akbar), it is the second Tibetan language newspaper to have been started, per available records. Its founder was one Gergan Dorje Tharchin, a Tibetan of Christian denomination who was a pastor at Kalimpong, at the time a border town that acted as a centre for the wool trade between Tibet and India. He was born in 1890 in Himachal Pradesh, in a village named Poo (Wylie: spu), and he was educated by Moravian missionaries. He did not use his newspaper as a platform for proselytizing Christianity to his readers.

Tharchin, also known as Tharchin Babu, served simultaneously as the journalist, chief editor and publisher of Mirror of News. He would translate news from his own subscriptions into Tibetan for the journal. His goal was to awaken Tibetans to the modern world and introduce Tibet to the outside world. The journal reported on the 1911 Revolution, World War II, the Indian independence movement, and covered events in Tibet, India, and Kalimpong itself.

=== Circulation and influence ===
Published on a monthly basis, the journal first came out in October 1925 under the title Yulchog Sosoi Sargyur Melong (Mirror of News from All Sides of the World) ). All 50 copies that were printed were sent to Gergan Tharchin's friends in Lhasa, including one for the 13th Dalai Lama who sent a letter encouraging him to continue with the publication and became an ardent reader. The 14th Dalai Lama was to inherit the Dalai Lama's subscription.

Despite its minuscule circulation, the journal exerted a huge influence on a small circle of Tibetan aristocrats, as well as on a smaller circle of Tibetan reformists. As the journal was an advocate of Tibet's independence, Tharchin's place became a meeting place for Tibetan nationalists and reformists anxious to modernise their country to counter China.

According to the opinion of Barun Roy, Tharchin was in close touch with the British intelligence agents operating out of Kalimpong, a town Roy says was a nest of political intrigue involving spies from India and China, refugees from Tibet, China, India and Burma, plus Buddhist scholars, monks, and lamas. Tharchin was acquainted with Hisao Kimura, a Japanese secret agent who had visited Mongolia on an undercover mission for the Japanese government, then travelled across Tibet to gather intelligence for the United Kingdom

In the 1950s, the Chinese Communists attempted to buy Tharchin's silence through an offer presented by a Tibetan aristocrat: The Chinese promised to order 500 copies of the newspaper, and gave the assurance Tharchin would not to go bankrupt. In exchange, he was requested not to publish anymore "anti-Chinese" articles, and to concentrate instead on the "progress" made by China in Tibet. Tharchin refused.

=== Bombing of monasteries ===
Tharchin continued to report on China's atrocities. The Tibetan resistance against the brutal socialist policies of the Chinese Communist Party led to a witnessed battle at the Lithang Monastery where monks, civilians, and Tibetan fighters tried to escape from a full-scale Chinese bombing assault and airstrike. As the Tibetan army had already been destroyed in China's initial invasion of 1949-1950, all the Tibetans in Kham and at Lithang were civilians whose casualties were reported to be in the hundreds to the thousands, while other bombings and massacres of Tibetans in Kham and Amdo were also widely reported. An illustration in Mirror of News dated 1 July 1957 includes a count of monks murdered by these air assaults on Tibet's monasteries: "At Cha-phreng, 1,400 monks before the attack, it is said that there are not more than 7 now; at Brag-mdo, 1,000 monks before the attack, there are none afterwards; at Ba-thang, 700 monks before the attack, not more than one monk remains."

From 1956 to 1957, the Mirror of News printed several depictions of this attack at Lithang Monastery and the aerial bombing by the People's Liberation Army, including the following English caption:

They are killing several thousand of our freedom-loving, brave, ill-armed Khampas, with modern weapons; and distroying monasterees [sic]. The world is protesting the aggressor in Europe and W. Asia, but alas! There is no voice for Tibet.

=== End of publication ===
The Mirror of News ceased publishing in 1963 when the exiled Tibetan community began publishing their first newspaper – Tibetan Freedom – founded by Gyalo Thondup from Darjeeling. Tharchin's son said his father was too old to continue his publication. Tharchin Babu died in 1976.

As of 2005, the small house in Kalimpong on Giri Road, where the Mirror of News was based, is still standing with a sign board reading "The Tibet Mirror Press, Kalimpong, Est. 1925" in English, Tibetan and Hindi.
