= Nangma =

Nangma (Tibetan: ནང་མ་; Chinese: 囊玛) is a genre of Tibetan dance music closely related to Toeshey (སྟོད་གཞས་). The word Nangma derives from the Persian word نغمه Naghma meaning melody. Both a band and a nightclub have been named after it. "Nangma" is the name of a four-person, traditional Tibetan band dedicated to these two styles of music. "Nangma" is also the name of a nightclub in Lhasa which plays this traditional music.

== Bibliography ==
- Geoffrey Samuel. 1976. 'Songs of Lhasa.' Ethnomusicology, vol.20 no.3, pp. 407–449.
