= Human rights in Tibet =

Human rights in Tibet is a subject which has been intensely scrutinized and debated on the international level, particularly since the annexation of Tibet by the People's Republic of China. Before the 1950s, Tibet's social structure was marked by inequality and as a result, it was described as a caste-like system or controversially, it was described as a system of serfdom. Severe punishments, including the permanent mutilation of body parts, were common, but capital punishment was banned in 1913. The Muslim warlord Ma Bufang caused widespread destruction and deaths in Amdo, which is located northeast of Central Tibet.

It is difficult to accurately determine the scope of the human rights abuses in Tibet since 1950 because the media is tightly controlled by the Chinese government and information about human rights is censored. Exile groups report that Tibetans in China are subjected to enforced disappearances and torture, including electric shocks, cold exposure, and severe beatings. Hundreds of Tibetans have been killed in crackdowns on dissent, and thousands more have been arbitrarily arrested and detained. Freedoms of speech, the press and political expression are suppressed or tightly controlled. Other methods which the Chinese authorities employ include heavy physical labor, "political investigation" sessions, and re-education through labor.

Allegations of genocide have been made by Tibetan rights groups due to famines and civil conflicts as well as allegations of cultural genocide via the sinicization of Tibet. These claims are disputed due to a stated lack of evidence and the general increases in the size of the Tibetan population, but a significant loss of life occurred during the 1950s and 1960s.

The Chinese government places strict limitations on the practice of Tibetan Buddhism. Public prayers for the 14th Dalai Lama are banned, and large religious gatherings require the government's approval. The authorities consistently discredit the 14th Dalai Lama by portraying him as a political figure rather than a religious figure, pressuring Tibetan Buddhists not to worship him.

== Social system ==
According to the journalist and writer Israel Epstein, a Polish Jew, a naturalized Chinese citizen, and a member of the CCP (who had not visited Tibet prior to its annexation by the PRC), "the old society" in Tibet "had nothing even remotely resembling human rights." He explains: "High and low, the belief had for centuries been enforced on the Tibetans that everyone's status was predetermined by fate, as a reward for virtues or penalty for faults on one's past incarnations. Hence it was deemed senseless for the rich (even though compassion was abstractly preached) to have qualms about sitting on the necks of the poor, and both criminal and blasphemous for the poor not to patiently bear the yoke. ‘Shangri-La’ the old Tibet was definitely not."

Robert W. Ford was one of the few Westerners to have been appointed by the Government of Tibet at the time of its de facto independence. From 1945 to 1950, he spent five years in Tibet before he was arrested by the invading Chinese army. In his book Wind Between the Worlds: Captured in Tibet, he wrote

"All over Tibet I had seen men who had been deprived of an arm or a leg for theft (...) Penal amputations were done without antiseptics or sterile dressings."

An ancient form of slavery which preceded the development of the feudal system, was still extant in a small number of manors in old Tibet (prior to 1959): the nanggzan manors (nanggzan meaning "family slave" in Tibetan). In these, according to Chinese sociologist Liu Zhong, "exploitation was not through land-rent but through enslavement" to the manor's owner. In return for working the land, the slaves were provided with lodging, clothing and food, albeit minimal. "Some slaves had their families [with them] while others did not." This residual form of slavery was finally abolished in Central Tibet in 1959 by the Preparatory Committee for the Founding of the Tibet Autonomous Region.

In Eastern societies, the nature and applicability of serfdom is contested by academics. In 1971, the Tibetologist Melvyn Goldstein wrote that "Tibet was characterized by a form of institutionalized inequality that can be called pervasive serfdom". However some academics have questioned the applicability of the concept to Tibet, a recent example was Heidi Fjeld who argued in 2003 that feudalism and the use of the term 'serf' was misleading in relation to the social system of Tibet and instead she described it as "a caste-like social hierarchy".

In the political debate concerning the legitimacy of the CCP's rule of the Tibetan Autonomous Region, official Chinese sources assert that the Communist invasion was justified in order to end the practice of "feudal serfdom" and other alleged human rights abuses under the Dalai Lama.

The Tibetan Government in Exile and supporters of the Tibetan independence movement contend that during the first half of the 20th century, efforts to modernize the country were underway, and they also argue that since the annexation of Tibet by the CCP, the human rights abuses which have been committed have inflicted greater suffering and repression upon the Tibetan people.

== Crimes and punishments ==
Trader Gyebo Sherpa was subjected to the severe corca whipping for selling cigarettes. He died from his wounds 2 days later in the Potala prison. Tashi Tsering, a self-described critic of traditional Tibetan society, records being whipped as a 13-year-old for missing a performance as a dancer in the Dalai Lama's dance troupe in 1942, until the skin split and the pain became excruciating. The Dalai Lama was reportedly seven years old at the time.

Yet, incidents of mutilation have been recorded in Tibet in the period between the start of the 20th Century and the PRC annexation. Tibetan communist Phuntso Wangye recalled his anger at seeing freshly severed human ears hanging from the gate of the county headquarters in Damshung north of Lhasa in 1945. The top level Tibetan official Lungshar's eyes were gouged out by direct order of the Kashag or Tibetan Government was carried out in 1934. An attempt was made at anesthetizing the alleged criminal with intoxicants before performing the punishment, which unfortunately did not work well.

In 1950, the six Tibetan border guards that had been involved in the killing or wounding of Frank Bessac's companions (one of them Douglas Mackiernan) as they were fleeing into Tibet from the Communist advance, were tried and sentenced to mutilation in Lhasa's military court: "The leader was to have his nose and both ears cut off. The man who fired the first shot was to lose both ears. A third man was to lose one ear, and the others were to get 50 lashes each." (The punishment was subsequently changed to lashings on Bessac's request.)

== Hostility towards Western missions and churches ==
In past centuries, Western missionaries made the perilous and time-consuming journey to Tibet, only to be frustrated by the low number of native converts, expelled from the area, or even killed. But at different stages of Tibetan history secular rulers and religious leaders such as the Dalai Lama have been eager to protect Western missionaries and their tasks of preaching Christian beliefs to the local Tibetans. The first Western missionary known to have reached Lhasa was the Jesuit Father Antonio de Andrade, accompanied by Fratello Manuel Marques. Their first encounter with the Tibetans occurred in 1624 and was cordial, with the Tibetans greeting Andrade and Marques with friendliness. However, as their mission expanded and gained followers, Christians soon faced persecution in Tibet, and the mission was eventually expelled.

In 1630, the Tsaparang Jesuit mission in the Guge Kingdom (presently the Gantok district of West Tibet) fell victim to an uprising by dissident local Yellow Hat lamas, led by the king's brother and abetted by the king of Ladakh, against the King who had lavished favours on the alien mission. Many Christian converts were carried off by force to Ladakh as slaves. The church and properties at Tsaparang and Rudok were sacked, and five resident Jesuits became virtual prisoners of the king of Ladakh who had become the de-facto ruler of Guge. A 1640 effort to reestablish the mission in Guge collapsed when a party of three new priests was attacked as it entered Tibet before reaching Tsaparang and was forced to retreat to India.

Between 1850 and 1880, after the Qing court's decree allowing Western missionaries to purchase lands and construct churches in Chinese provinces, as many as a dozen lower ranking priests of the Paris Foreign Mission Society were killed or injured during their journeys to missionary outposts in the Sino-Tibetan borderlands. In 1881, Father Brieux, then head of the Paris Foreign Mission Society in Batang in eastern Tibet, was reported to have been murdered on his way to Lhasa. After proper investigations, Qing officials discovered that the murder cases were covertly supported and even orchestrated by local lamaseries and native chieftains. Feeling threatened by the increasing number of new Christian converts in eastern Tibet, as well as by the imperial decree allowing the missionaries to openly purchase and possess land, the lamaistic monastic communities and their political patrons felt the need to take drastic measures to secure their religious, financial, and political interests.

In 1904, Qing official Feng Quan sought to curtail the influence of the Gelugpa Sect and ordered the protection of Western missionaries and their churches. Indignation over Feng Quan and the Christian presence escalated to a climax in March 1905 when thousands of the Batang lamas revolted, resulting in the killing of Feng, his entourage, local Manchu and Han Chinese officials, and the local French Catholic priests. The revolt soon spread to other cities in eastern Tibet, such as Chamdo, Litang, and Nyarong, and at one point, it almost spilled over into neighboring Sichuan Province. The missionary stations and churches in these areas were burned and destroyed by the angry Gelugpa monks and local chieftains. Dozens of local Westerners, including at least four priests, were killed or fatally wounded. The scale of the rebellion was so tremendous that only when panicked Qing authorities hurriedly sent 2,000 troops from Sichuan to pacify the mobs did the revolt gradually come to an end. The lamasery authorities and local native chieftains' hostility towards the Western missionaries in Tibet lingered through the last throes of the Manchu dynasty and into the Republican period.

According to Hsiao-ting Lin, it was neither 'anti-imperialism' nor 'patriotism' – contrary to what is asserted by the 'standard' Chinese historical narratives – that led the Tibetans to expel the Western missionaries, but "the fact that Tibetan religious and political figures were desperate to prevent any possible intrusion into their local interests and privileges by Christian authorities."

== Reforms ==
According to supporters of the Tibetan Government in Exile, the 13th Dalai Lama banned capital punishment in 1913 as part of his reforms, making Tibet one of the first countries to do so. This fact is acknowledged by Sir Charles Bell, a friend of the Dalai Lama, with the following reservation, "the punishment for deliberate murder is usually so severe that the convict can hardly survive for long."

Historian Alex C. McKay notes that isolated incidents of capital punishment occurred in later years, such as the death of a man named Padma Chandra and the execution of a youth who was involved in the stealing of the western Tibetan administrator's horse. McKay also stresses the fact that corporal punishment continued to be inflicted for numerous offenses and it was frequently fatal.

== Ma Bufang's military campaigns ==
With the support of the Kuomintang's Republic of China, Muslim warlord Ma Bufang launched seven expeditions into Golog. One Tibetan counted the number of times Ma attacked, remembering the seventh one for making "life impossible". Ma and his army wiped out thousands of Tibetans, especially in northeast and eastern Qinghai, and they also destroyed multiple Tibetan Buddhist temples.

== Post-1950 Tibet ==
=== Difficulties in reporting ===
According to an Asia Watch Committee report which was published in 1988, the question of human rights in a minority area of the People's Republic of China is inherently difficult to research and address. Official sensitivity around the Tibet issue compounds the problem. Government measures to prevent information about Tibetan protests and protesters from leaving China have hindered human rights monitoring organizations from providing an adequate account of protests and their consequences, according to the CECC.

The position of the CCP that any discussion of the issue by foreigners is "unacceptable interference in China's internal affairs" is itself an obstacle to scrutiny. The Chinese government has also linked negative remarks about human rights in Tibet with damage to Sino-American relations. This relates to questions about political prisoners, population transfer, and more, which are "hidden in secrecy," according to the report. Thus, gathering information on such subjects with regard to Tibet is a difficult undertaking.

The history of reporting on abuses in modern Tibet goes back to Choekyi Gyaltsen, the 10th Panchen Lama, who first criticized the situation in Tibet by composing the 70,000 Character Petition dealing with the suppression of the Tibetan people in retaliation for the 1959 Tibetan uprising.

In April 2026, the U.S. State Department reported that the Tibet Autonomous Region (TAR) remained the only part of China requiring special permits for foreign visitors, with even stricter rules for overseas Tibetans. Journalists, diplomats, and Tibetan Americans faced harassment and surveillance, reflecting Beijing’s tight control over travel and information in the region.

=== Types of abuses ===
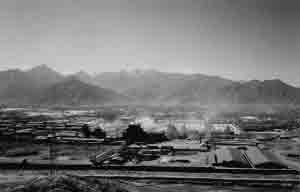
An aerial shot of Drapchi Prison in Lhasa, which, according to the Central Tibetan Administration, has gained a notorious reputation for its violent treatment of prisoners.

According to a 2009 United States report, human rights abuses include the deprivation of life, disappearances, torture, poor prison conditions, arbitrary arrest and detention, denial of fair public trial, denial of freedom of speech and of press and Internet freedoms, political and religious repression. Types of torture range from electric shocks, exposure to cold, severe beatings, and hard labour according to Tibetans repatriated from Nepal. Prisoners have been routinely subjected to "political investigation" sessions and punished if deemed insufficiently loyal to the state.

In many cases, Tibetans have faced persecution solely because of their efforts to safeguard their cultural identity and fundamental rights without any other crime or political activity being involved. Allegations of forced abortions, sterilization, and infanticide are disputed. Tibet also has massive labour initiatives with reports of unfavourable working conditions, workplace harassment, and a deficiency in inspection mechanisms for addressing violations, as well as programs of ideological re-education and relocation. 15 percent of Tibet's population has undergone labor training. 50,000 of them took up jobs within Tibet, while several thousand ended up working in other parts of China. Human rights groups say that the transfer of workers suggest coercive elements are involved. Other scholars point out that vocational programs in Tibet are undersupplied compared to other parts of China and welcomed by non-elite Tibetans as a means of upward mobility. They have cautioned against mistaking instances of abuse for systematic coercion.

Critics of the CCP say that its official aim to eliminate "the three evils of separatism, terrorism and religious extremism" is used as a pretext for human rights abuses.

==== Physical abuses ====
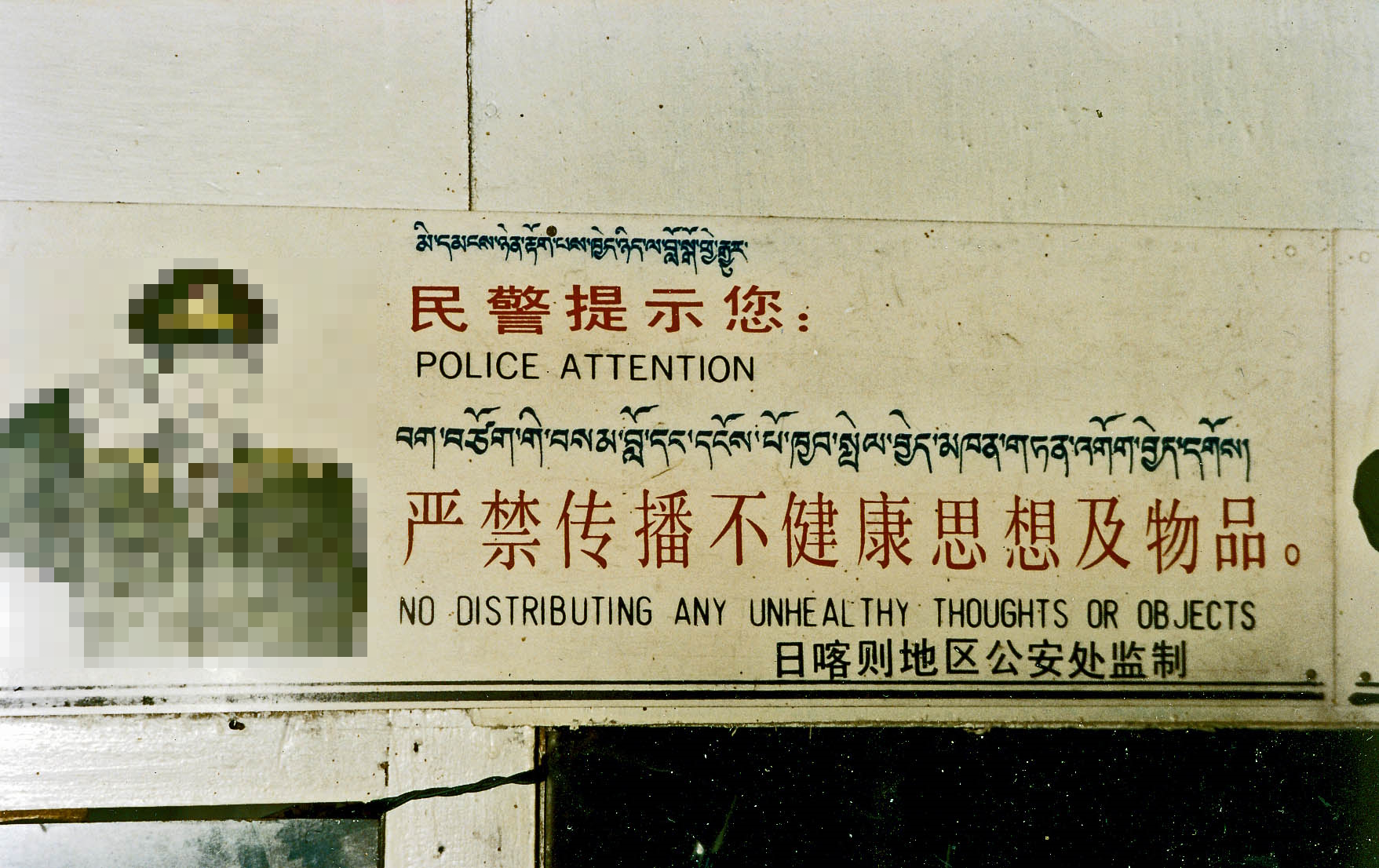
"Police Attention: No distributing any unhealthy thoughts or objects." A trilingual (Tibetan - Chinese- English) sign above the entrance to a small café in Nyalam Town, Tibet, 1993.

According to a UN report regarding the adoption of its Tibetan resolution in 1965, "The Chinese occupation of Tibet has been characterized by acts of murder, rape and arbitrary imprisonment; torture and cruel, inhuman and degraded treatment of Tibetans on a large scale."

The 10th Panchen Lama said in relation to atrocities by Chinese forces: "If there was a film made on all the atrocities perpetrated in Qinghai Province, it would shock the viewers. In Golok area, many people were killed and their dead bodies rolled down the hill into a big ditch. The soldiers told the family members and relatives of the dead people that they should celebrate since the rebels have been wiped out. They were forced to dance on the dead bodies. Soon after, they were also massacred with machine guns...In Amdo and Kham, people were subjected to unspeakable atrocities. People were shot in groups of ten or twenty... Such actions have left deep wounds in the minds of the people"

Since 10 March 2008, exiled Tibetan sources have documented that 228 Tibetans have died under the crackdown, 1,294 have been injured, 4,657 arbitrarily detained, 371 sentenced and 990 disappeared. Four Tibetans were executed in Lhasa on 20 October 2009, while the Chinese authorities confirmed only two. 11 Tibetans were sentenced to life imprisonment. In the majority of cases the defendants had no independent legal counsel and when a lawyer of choice represented the defendants, the authorities blocked representations either through intimidation or on procedural grounds. Amnesty International have stated that there have been a number of detainees in prisons and detention centres in Tibet were "reported to have died in custody, or within weeks of their release, apparently as a result of ill-treatment or lack of medical care in detention."

In one case a Tibetan from Sichuan province, Paltsal Kyab, died five weeks after he had been detained by police in connection with the 2008 protests. His family was not allowed to visit him while he was detained, and received no news until being informed of his death. When claiming his body, family members found it bruised and covered with blister burns; they discovered later that he also had internal injuries, according to Amnesty International. The police told the family that he had died of an illness, though relatives claimed he was healthy when detained.

In 2017, Jamyang Samten, a Tibetan adolescent of 15 years old that was part of a group of 75 Tibetans fleeing Tibet for Nepal was arrested after a shooting incident in Nangpa La pass. Samten was detained, interrogated and tortured using a cattle prod while being chained to a wall with others detained Tibetans. Samten said that he was also punched in the stomach by a guard with a metal glove. Due to his strong desire in seeing the Dalai Lama Samten afterwards again tried to cross the border to Nepal and succeed and arrived afterwards to India. As of 2007, there were around 3,000 to 4,000 Tibetans annually trying to cross the border to Nepal by paying smugglers. Many were enrolled in detention centres for "political re-education" where they suffered from mental and physical hardship.

==== Allegations of genocide ====
According to a secret People's Liberation Army (PLA) document which was purportedly captured by Tibetan guerrillas, 87,000 deaths were recorded in Lhasa between March 1959 and September 1960. Regarding this document, Chinese demographer Yan Hao wonders why "it took six years for the PLA document to be captured, and 30 years for it to be published" ("by a Tibetan Buddhist organisation in India in 1990"), adding that it was "highly unlikely that a resistance force could ever exist in Tibet as late as 1966."

According to Friends of Tibet, an organization that defines itself as a "people's movement for an Independent Tibet", the number of Tibetans who were killed after the Chinese occupation—a period marked by torture and starvation—now exceeds a million. The 14th Dalai Lama has alleged that 1.2 million Tibetans were killed under Chinese rule.

In her book "People who Count" (1995), Dorothy Stein describes how the number of deaths which the Chinese are held responsible for was estimated by "Tibetan nationalists" (her words): "they are attributed to 'figures published by the Information Office of the Central Tibetan Secretariat' in India." "A letter to Tibetan Review by Jampel Senge (April, 1989, p. 22) says 'The census which resulted in the figure of 1.2 was conducted by the Government in Exile through exiled Tibetans who travelled to meet their relations, and through new arrivals from Tibet."

The figure of 1.2 million deaths is challenged by Chinese demographer Yan Hao who says that the methodology which was used by the TGIE is defective. "How can they come to these exact death figures by analysing documents," he questions, "if they have problems in working out an exact figure of Tibet's total population alive at present?" "How can they break down the figures by regions" "when they have a problem in clearly defining the boundary of the greater Tibet as well as its provinces?" Yan Hao stresses that "knowledge of statistics tells us that random sampling is necessary for acquiring reliable data in any surveys" and "those conducted entirely among political refugees could produce anything but objective and unbiased results."

Patrick French, the former director of the Free Tibet Campaign in London, states that there is "no evidence" to support the figure of 1.2 million Tibetans who were killed as a result of Chinese rule. He estimates that as many as half a million Tibetans died from repression and famine under Chinese rule.

In a Written report which was compiled for the United Nations High Commissioner for Refugees in 2005, Professor Colin P. Mackerras writes that the claims such as that the Chinese are swamping Tibetans in their own country and that 1.2 million Tibetans have died due to Chinese occupation should be treated with "the deepest scepticism". The figures show that since the early 1960s, the Tibetan population has been increasing, probably for the first time for centuries. What seems to follow from this is that the TGIE's allegations of population reduction due to Chinese rule probably have some validity for the 1950s but are greatly exaggerated. However, since the 1960s, Chinese rule has had the effect of increasing the population of the Tibetans, not decreasing it, largely due to a modernization process that has improved the standard of living and lowered infant, maternity and other mortality rates.

In his essay Hidden Tibet: History of Independence and Occupation published by the Library of Tibetan Works and Archives at Dharamsala, Sergius L. Kuzmin provided detailed analysis of human losses in Tibet, varying from 3 to 30% population when using different sources. He indicated inadequacy of demography-based results and noted that local-level data was generalized and has only been published by the Tibetan emigrants. He argued that, according to International Law, actions of Maoists in Tibet can be qualified as genocide, regardless of which of the above estimates of population losses one considers to be credible.

==== Allegations of forced abortions, sterilizations and infanticide ====
In 1992, Paul Ingram, speaking on behalf of an NGO group for the Convention on the Rights of the Child claimed that "Few people or organisations seem willing to admit that the Chinese FORCE [sic] Tibetan women to be sterilised, or to have abortions, or will entertain the perspective that their policy is one of planned cultural genocide against the Tibetan people, supplemented by an enormous influx of Chinese settlers. Yet there is a great deal of evidence and detailed testimony, which indicates that this has been Chinese policy in Tibet for many years," saying that it was "Nazi-like".

In The Making of Modern Tibet, historian A. Tom Grunfeld observes that "in the years following the [1960] publication of the LIC's report, the Dalai Lama, Purshottam Trikamdas and the ICJ" (International Commission of Jurists) "all claimed to have found proof of sterilization; yet they failed to produce a single person who could be clinically examined to verify these claims."

A demographical survey of Pala – an area located in Western Changtang about 300 miles north-west of Lhasa – conducted by tibetologist Melvyn Goldstein brings to light that from 1959 to 1990 large families remained the norm and that no reproductive restraints were imposed on nomadic herders: "Despite repeated claims in the West that the Chinese had imposed a strict policy of birth control in Tibet, where ‘forced abortions, sterilisations and infanticides are everyday occurrences’ (New York Times, 31 January 1992), there was no policy of restricting reproduction in Pala, let alone evidence of forced abortions, sterilisations or infanticide." An analysis of the fertility histories collected from 71 females aged from 15 to 59 provides strong evidence in support of the conclusion that no population control policy restricting couples to 2 or even 3 births was or is operative. Besides, no Pala nomads have ever been fined for any subsequent children, and all such children and their families enjoy full rights in the community.

In China's Birth Control Policy in the Tibet Autonomous Region - Myths and Realities, Melvyn C. Goldstein and Cynthia M. Beall report that "A series of published reports claim that China was and is compelling Tibetans to adhere to a strict birth control program that includes forced abortions, sterilizations, and even infanticide.

In a study of fertility and family planning in rural Tibet published in 2002, Melvyn C. Goldstein, Ben Jiao, Cynthia M. Beall and Phuntsog Tsering claim that there was no evidence in any of the sites surveyed that Lhasa was applying a two-child birth rule in rural Tibet. Although a Tibet Information Network report stated that this policy was in place, when Ngamring county, which was cited in the report, was visited, no such policy was evident. The Ngamring county government had striven to increase the use of family planning in the 1990s, but in the summer of 2000 no local nomads or officials in the area of study had heard anything about a two-child limit, nor had any of the officials interviewed at the Ngamring county seat. And finally, no fines had been imposed for fourth and subsequent births. For its authors, "the study highlights the dangers of using refugee reports and anecdotal evidence to interpret highly politicized situations."

==== Infringements on freedom of religion ====
Residents of Tibet state that there are clear limits on their right to practice Buddhism. The most stringently enforced restrictions are the ban on public prayers for the 14th Dalai Lama. Also, permission to hold large public gatherings is required by the Chinese authorities, and Buddhist gatherings are not exempted from this requirement.

The Minister of Foreign Affairs of the People's Republic of China, Yang Jiechi, told a press conference in March 2009 that the Dalai Lama is "by no means a religious figure but a political figure." Xinhua, quoting a Tibetologist, echoed this theme, referring to the Dalai Lama's efforts in establishing a government in exile, establishing a Constitution, and other things. Ending the "Dalai clique"'s use of monasteries for subversion against the state is a core part of the campaign that promotes the CCP's "stability and harmony in the religious field". The state supervisory organ for Buddhism, the Buddhist Association of China, changed their charter in 2009 to denounce the Dalai Lama for agitating for Tibetan independence. The Central People's Government has asserted a right to approve the next Dalai Lama, according to "historical conventions" used in the Qing Dynasty since 1793.

The Tibetan Centre for Human Rights and Democracy (TCHRD) reported instances of "patriotic education" in 2005, from the testimony of "young Tibetan monks who escaped from Tibet". In them, monks were given political literature and a script to recite to County Religious Bureau officials when they were due to visit. They were instructed to practice denouncing the Dalai Lama as a "separatist" and to pledge allegiance to China, and were quizzed on the literature. Officials also extolled the monks to accept the legitimacy of Gyaincain Norbu, the government choice for 11th Panchen Lama.

According to the CECC, educational, legal, and propaganda channels are used to pressure Tibetan Buddhists to change their religious beliefs into a doctrine that promotes government positions and policy. This has resulted instead in continuing Tibetan demands for freedom of religion and the Dalai Lama's return to Tibet. In June 2009, a monastic official who also holds the vice chairmanship of the CPPCC for Tibet, told monks at Galden Jampaling Monastery in Qamdo that their freedom of religion was a result of the Party's benevolence. The TCHRD has claimed that Chinese authorities in 2003 threatened residents of a Tibetan-inhabited county with expropriation if they did not hand over portraits of the Dalai Lama within a month.

The CCP further increased its influence over the teaching and practice of Tibetan Buddhism in 2009, including intensifying a media campaign to discredit the Dalai Lama as a religious leader and preventing Tibetans from respecting him as such. Chinese official statements also indicated that the government would select a successor to the Dalai Lama when he passes away. Tibetans are expected to "embrace such a development." Approximately 800,000-900,000 Tibetan children have experienced separation from their families and compelled to attend colonial boarding schools, wherein they are exposed to indoctrination as part of the CCP's efforts to eradicate Tibetans' national identity according to Free Tibet.

In July 2024, Radio Free Asia reported that ordinary Tibetans in the neighboring Sichuan province have been forced by authorities to remove religious symbols from their homes. While religious demolitions have occurred in Tibetan monasteries, July 2024 marked the first instance of ordinary people's religious symbols being destroyed. Also in 2024, Tibetan monk Jampa Choephel of Penkar Thang Monastery in Rebkong county, Qinghai province, was arrested on March 10 after sharing a speech by the Dalai Lama online. He was sentenced to 18 months in prison.

Access to religious texts and places of worship is limited for average Tibetans, and thus many rely on the internet to find and share teachings. However, Chinese authorities restrict access to religious material online and regularly question, detain, and prosecute Tibetans who share "unapproved" religious teachings through social media and even private phone conversations.

Tibetan singer Ah Sang, also known as Tsugte, remains in Chinese custody as of October 2025 after his July arrest for performing a song honoring the Dalai Lama's 90th birthday. His detention, without contact with family, is seen as part of China's wider crackdown on Tibetan cultural and religious expression. His whereabouts and condition remain unknown.

On 17 May 1995, Chinese authorities took Gedhun Choekyi Nyima, a six-year-old boy recognized by the Dalai Lama as the 11th Panchen Lama, and have kept him and his family hidden for the past 31 years. Thirty-one years later, China's government-appointed replacement, Gyaltsen Norbu, continues to serve in the role, a choice rejected by Tibetans and the international community.

==== 'Reshaping' Tibetan Buddhism ====
In February 2009, the "Tibet Branch" of the Buddhist Association of China changed its charter in an attempt to pressure Tibetan Buddhist monks and nuns to treat the Dalai Lama as a "de facto criminal" and a threat to Tibetan Buddhism, according to a report which was published by China's state-controlled media. The revised charter urged monks and nuns to "see clearly that the 14th Dalai Lama is the ringleader of the separatist political association which seeks 'Tibet independence,' a loyal tool of anti-China Western forces, the very root that causes social unrest in Tibet and the biggest obstacle for Tibetan Buddhism to build up its order." The CECC argues that incorporating language classifying the Dalai Lama as a "separatist" into the charter of a government-designated religious organization increases the risk of punishment for monks and nuns who maintain religious devotion to the Dalai Lama even if they do not engage in overt political activity. The CCP has pressured other governments to abandon support of the Dalai Lama and instead to support the Party line on Tibetan issues.

On March 10, 2010, the Dalai Lama stated that "the Chinese authorities are conducting various political campaigns, including patriotic re-education campaigns, in many monasteries in Tibet. They are forcing the monks and nuns to live in prison-like conditions, they are depriving them of the opportunity to study and practice in peace. These living conditions make the monasteries function more like museums because they are deliberately designed to deliberately annihilate Buddhism."

In the Chinese government's official propaganda, the Dalai Lama's advocacy on behalf of the Tibetan people and their culture is used to argue that he is not a legitimate religious leader, because he is a political actor. Ending the Dalai Lama's role as supreme religious leader is a core part of the campaign that promotes the CCP's "stability" and "harmony" in the Tibetan areas of China. This was carried out by state-run media and senior government officials. Minister of Foreign Affairs Yang Jiechi, for example, told a press conference in March 2009 that the Dalai Lama is "by no means a religious figure but a political figure."

The official response to the continuing criticism of the CCP's policies by Tibetans includes "aggressive campaigns" of "patriotic education" ("love the country, love religion") and legal education. Patriotic education sessions require monks and nuns to pass examinations on political texts, affirm that "Tibet is historically a part of China," accept the legitimacy of the Panchen Lama installed by the Chinese government, and denounce the Dalai Lama.

In June 2009, a monastic official who also holds the rank of Vice Chairman of the TAR Chinese People's Political Consultative Conference (CPPCC) spoke to monks at Jampaling (Qiangbalin) Monastery in Changdu (Chamdo) prefecture, TAR, and emphasized the dependency of "freedom of religion" on Party control and patriotism toward China. "Without the Party's regulations," he told the monks, "there would be no freedom of religion for the masses. To love religion, you must first love your country."

According to the CECC, Chinese officials justify such campaigns as "legitimate and necessary" by seeking to characterize and conflate a range of Tibetan objections to the state's policies as threats to China's unity and stability. An example given to substantiate this is comments made by Tibet Autonomous Region (TAR) Party Secretary Zhang Qingli and Vice Minister of Public Security Zhang Xinfeng, speaking during a February 2009 teleconference on "the work of maintaining social stability." They called for "large numbers of party, government, military, and police personnel in Tibet to immediately go into action" and "resolutely smash the savage attacks by the Dalai clique and firmly win the current people's war against separatism and for stability." Principal speakers at the teleconference stressed the importance of "education campaigns" in achieving such objectives.

A Tibetan activist group reported that Chinese authorities in Kardze County and Lithang County in Kardze Tibet Autonomous Prefecture ("TAP"), Sichuan Province, as part of the anti-Dalai Lama campaign, threatened the local populace with confiscation of their land if they do not hand over portraits of the Dalai Lama within a month.

In 2005, jurist Barry Sautman wrote that the ban on the public display of photos of the 14th Dalai Lama began in 1996 in the TAR but it was not enforced in the Tibetan areas of the provinces of Qinghai, Gansu, Sichuan and Yunnan.

==== Residential schools ====
In February 2023, UN experts said that around one million Tibetan children were attending mandatory boarding schools that separated them from their families and taught primarily in Mandarin Chinese, with a curriculum governed by the CCP. Parents refusing boarding schools have reportedly been threatened with fines. On 11 November 2022, a team of Special Rapporteurs from the United Nations Human Rights Council wrote a letter to the Chinese government that states, "In particular, the residential schools system for Tibetan children appears to act as a large-scale program to assimilate Tibetans into majority Han culture, contrary to the international human rights standards." The schools house children as young as four-years-old, and critics like Tenzin Dorjee and Gyal Lo draw a sharp comparison to the residential school system used in North America to suppress indigenous peoples there. In total, approximately 78% of children in Tibet attend boarding schools, whereas the national average in China overall is 22%. In 2023, the UN Committee on Economic, Social and Cultural Rights (CESCR) expressed concerns about reports that the residential schools form part of a campaign aimed at eradicating Tibetan culture and language. China says that in remote areas such as Tibet, boarding schools are used as a practical way of implementing primary and secondary education due to a shortage of teachers and other resources there.

On a government-organized visit in 2023, Associated Press reporters observed a Tibetan-language lesson at a boarding school in Sichuan.

In a 2024 statement to the BBC, the Chinese embassy in London defended the boarding school policy as follows: "Due to a highly scattered population, children have to travel long distances to get to school, which is very inconvenient [...] If schools were to be built in every place the students live, it would be very difficult to ensure adequate teachers and quality of teaching. That is why local governments set up boarding schools." Opponents to the policy say that forcibly separating children from their families creates psychological trauma. The embassy also said that ethnic minorities in China have "the freedom to use and develop their own spoken and written languages." However, the student the BBC spoke to said only the Chinese language was encouraged at her school. "All the classes were taught in Chinese, except for the Tibetan language class. Our school had a big library, but I didn't see any Tibetan books there," she said.

On 8 September 2025, China submitted a draft Law on Promoting Ethnic Unity and Progress to the National People's Congress, aiming to promote Mandarin over minority languages. Human Rights Watch and others criticized the law for potentially justifying repression and enforcing uniform party ideology domestically and among overseas Chinese.

On 31 October 2025, the CCP faced international criticism for hosting a symposium in Chengdu defending Tibet's boarding school system, which rights groups allege erases Tibetan culture. While Chinese state media and some scholars praised the schools for promoting education and ethnic understanding, the Tibet Action Institute's 2025 report stated that children are forcibly separated from families and indoctrinated, raising concerns of cultural assimilation.

In 2026, China introduced the Law on Promoting Ethnic Unity and Progress, which increased the use of Mandarin in preschools and included political lessons in the curriculum. The law reduced the teaching of Tibetan and affected the way children learn about their language, culture, and traditions. Critics say it is part of a wider effort to shape education and influence the cultural identity of Tibetan communities.

==== Forced relocation of rural Tibetans ====
Human Rights Watch (HRW) reported in 2024 that China has accelerated the forced urbanization of Tibetan villagers and herders. This expands upon China's past policy of moving more than 30 million residents nationwide from what it claims to be impoverished and ecological vulnerable areas to more sustainable locations. According to HRW, by the end of 2025, more than 930,000 rural Tibetans will have been relocated to urban centres where they have struggled to find full employment. Han Chinese migrants are usually economically and politically dominant in large towns and cities such as Lhasa, capital of the Tibet Autonomous Region.

Chinese leaders have forced more than 3 million rural Tibetans to give up their traditional nomadic lifestyles based on yak herding and agriculture by building towns and housing projects without moving them. According to a 2024 Freedom House report, such policies have reduced the ethnic Tibetan share of the population over time.

=== 2008 unrest ===
In March 2008, what began as routine monastic commemorations of Tibetan Uprising Day descended into riots, beatings, and arson by Tibetans against Han, Hui, and even other Tibetans, killing 18 civilians and 1 police officer. Casualties sustained during the subsequent police crackdown are unknown, according to the U.S. Department of State. Many members of the People's Armed Police (PAP) remained in communities across the Tibetan Plateau during the year, and the fallout from the protests continued to impact on human rights outcomes for Tibetan people.

According to numerous sources, the U.S. Department of State says, many detained after the riots were subject to extrajudicial punishments such as severe beatings and deprivation of food, water, and sleep for long periods. In some cases detainees sustained broken bones and other serious injuries at the hands of PAP and Public Security Bureau (PSB) officers. According to eyewitnesses, the bodies of persons killed during the unrest or subsequent interrogation were disposed of secretly rather than returned to their families. Many monasteries and nunneries remained under virtual lock-down, while the authorities renewed the "Patriotic Education" campaign, according to Amnesty International, involving written denunciations against the Dalai Lama.

Tibetan members of the CCP were also targeted, including being forced to remove their children from Tibet exile community schools where they obtain religious education. In March 2010 as many as 50 Tibetans were arrested for sending reports, photos, and video abroad during the unrest, according to Reporters Without Borders (RSF). One individual received a 10-year prison sentence.

It was Chinese government and CCP interference with the norms of Tibetan Buddhism, and "unremitting antagonism toward the Dalai Lama," that were key factors behind the protests, according to a special report by the US Congressional-Executive Commission on China.

Many members of the People's Armed Police (PAP) remained in communities across the Tibetan Plateau during the year, and the fallout from the protests continued to impact on human rights outcomes for Tibetan people. Amnesty International was "deeply concerned at the human rights violations" that occurred during these events and called on the Human Rights Council to address the human rights situation during the 2008 unrest.

=== Tibetan-Muslim religious violence ===
The majority of Muslims in Tibet are Hui people. Tension between Tibetans and Muslims stems from events during the Muslim warlord Ma Bufang's rule in Qinghai such as Ngolok rebellions (1917–49) and the Sino-Tibetan War. In the past riots have broken out between Muslims and Tibetans. The repression of Tibetan separatism by the Chinese government is supported by Hui Muslims. In addition, Chinese-speaking Hui have problems with Tibetan Hui (the Tibetan speaking Kache minority of Muslims).

The main Mosque in Lhasa was burned down by Tibetans and Chinese Hui Muslims were violently assaulted by Tibetan rioters in the 2008 Tibetan unrest. Sectarian violence between Tibetan Buddhists and Muslims does not get widespread attention in the media.

=== Reforms ===
In 1987, the 14th Dalai Lama's brother Jigme Norbu reports that living conditions in jails were improved under the Chinese regime, with officials being designated to see that these conditions and rules were maintained."

In the reforms that were enacted after the 1959 Tibetan uprising, the Italian Marxist philosopher Domenico Losurdo saw a chance for the Tibetan populace to access the human rights which they were previously denied, besides the chance to gain considerably improved living conditions and a significantly increased average life expectancy.

=== Verifiability of exiles' accounts ===
Psychologist and writer Colin Goldner argues that although violence and destruction had been carried out by the People's Liberation Army, especially during the Cultural Revolution, the accounts of Tibetan exiles cannot be trusted either because:

"These are, if not totally invented out of thin air, as a rule hopelessly exaggerated and/or refer to no longer actual happenings. The contention of the Dalai Lama's exiled government that 'the daily life of the Tibetans in their own land' are dictated by 'torture, mental terror, discrimination and a total disrespect for of human dignity' is pure propaganda meant to collect sympathy points or monetary contributions; such accusations do not reflect today's realities in Tibet. Likewise, the accusations of forced abortions and blanket area sterilizations of Tibetan women, of a flooding of the land by Chinese colonists, of systematic destruction of the Tibetan cultural heritage do not agree with the facts."

Amnesty International have stated that there have been "consistent reports", including "testimonies by former detainees and relatives of detainees who left Tibet illegally" that indicated that people held in police stations and detainees in prisons and detention centres in Tibet have been "systematically tortured and ill-treated." The chairman of the Committee Against Torture stated that "allegations of torture were numerous and mutually corroborative: torture did not seem like an isolated phenomenon." China's report on its implementation of the Convention Against Torture did not address these allegations that torture had occurred in Tibet, with many of the questions the members of the Committee Against Torture had relating to this towards China "remained largely unanswered".

The American sinologist Allen Carlson is of the opinion that it is nearly impossible, without substantial field research in Tibet, to verify the numerous allegations of violations advanced by China critics. He does, however, state, "my analysis of Beijing's policies and practices has left me with the impression that the Chinese leadership has no reservations about using whatever means necessary to secure Chinese rule over Tibet."

According to Amnesty International "The Chinese authorities have turned down as 'inconvenient' requests for visits to the TAR by several UN human rights experts."

== See also ==
- Annexation of Tibet by the People's Republic of China
- Antireligious campaigns in China § Tibetan Buddhists
- Anti-Tibetan sentiment § China
- Cultural repression in Tibet
- Freedom of religion in China § Tibetan Buddhism
- History of Tibet (1950–present)
- Human rights in China § Tibetan Buddhism
- Penal system in China
  - Labour camps in Tibet
    - List of concentration and internment camps § Tibet
      - List of prisons in the Tibet Autonomous Region
- Persecution of Buddhists § Tibet
- Protests and uprisings in Tibet since 1950
- Racism in China § Discrimination against Tibetans
- Sinicization of Tibet
- Tibetan diaspora
- Tibetan independence movement
- Tibetan sovereignty debate § Human rights
