= Tibetan sovereignty debate =

Political debate

There are two political debates regarding the relationship between Tibet and China. The first debate concerns whether Tibet Autonomous Region (TAR) and parts of neighboring provinces that are claimed as political Tibet should separate themselves from China and become a new sovereign state. Many of the points in this political debate rest on the points which are within the second debate, about whether Tibet was independent or subordinate to China during certain periods of its history. China has claimed control over Tibet since the 13th century, though this has been contested. All countries today officially recognize Tibet as part of the People's Republic of China and do not acknowledge it as an independent state. While Tibetan independence advocates argue Tibet had periods of de facto independence, Chinese control was solidified in the 1950s. Today, Tibet is officially designated as the Tibet Autonomous Region (TAR) within the People's Republic of China.

It is generally believed that Tibet was independent from China prior to the Yuan dynasty (1271–1368), and Tibet has been governed by the People's Republic of China (PRC) since 1959.

The nature of Tibet's relationship with China in the intervening period is a matter of debate:

- The PRC asserts that Tibet has been a part of China since the Mongol-led Yuan dynasty.
- The Republic of China (ROC) asserted that "Tibet was then definitely placed under the sovereignty of China" when the Qing dynasty (1644–1912) ended the brief Nepalese invasion (1788–1792) of parts of Tibet in c. 1793.
- The Tibetan Government in Exile asserts that Tibet was an independent state until the PRC invaded Tibet in 1949/1950.
- A number of outside scholars maintain that Tibet and China were ruled by the Mongols during the Yuan dynasty, treating Tibet and China as separate realms under a common rule. Some others regard Tibet as "part of a Mongol-ruled Chinese state". Many scholars maintain that Ming China (1364–1644) possessed no administrative control in Tibet, while some scholars indicated that Imperial Chinese superiority continued after Yuan and lasted until Qing. Tibet was part of the Chinese Empire, or at the very least subordinate to the Manchu-ruled China during much of the Qing dynasty.
- Many scholars maintain that Tibet, from 1912 to 1951, enjoyed de facto independence with no formal international recognition. Others believe that the 1914 Simla Convention formally recognized Chinese suzerainty over Tibet.

Presently, the 14th and current Dalai Lama is not in support of Tibetan separatism, and has advocated Tibetan autonomy under Chinese sovereignty instead. His approach is known as the "Middle Way" in which has been officially adopted by the 4th session of the 12th Assembly of Tibetan People's Deputies on September 18, 1997. In 2005, the 14th Dalai Lama emphasized that Tibet is a part of China, and Tibetan culture and Buddhism are part of Chinese culture.

== Background ==
Since the 13th century, Tibet has been under the suzerainty of non-Tibetan rulers, first under the Mongols and later under Chinese authority, with autonomous status within China since 1720. The Tang-Tibet treaty of 821, often cited for recognizing Tibetan sovereignty and territorial integrity, has not been honored by any Chinese government since that time.

From the 19th century onwards, foreign powers have consistently recognized Tibet as part of China in all diplomatic agreements, which accorded China the sovereign right to negotiate and sign treaties related to Tibet. Despite minor exceptions, no country has formally recognized Tibet as a sovereign nation over the past two centuries.

The political authority of the Dalai Lamas in Tibet was influenced by external powers, with the title "Dalai" originating from the Mongols. Since the 18th century, Chinese authorities have overseen the selection of the Dalai and Panchen Lamas.

== Current international context ==
Between 1911 and 1951 Tibet was free of the paramountcy of the Republic of China and functioned as a de facto independent entity. However it did not receive the de jure international recognition of a legal status separate from China. Today's Tibet is internationally recognized as part of China. It is not listed in the list of countries and territories to be decolonized published in 2008 by the UN, and China is not mentioned among the administering powers. No country has recognized the Tibetan government in exile as the legitimate government of Tibet.

== Views of Chinese governments ==
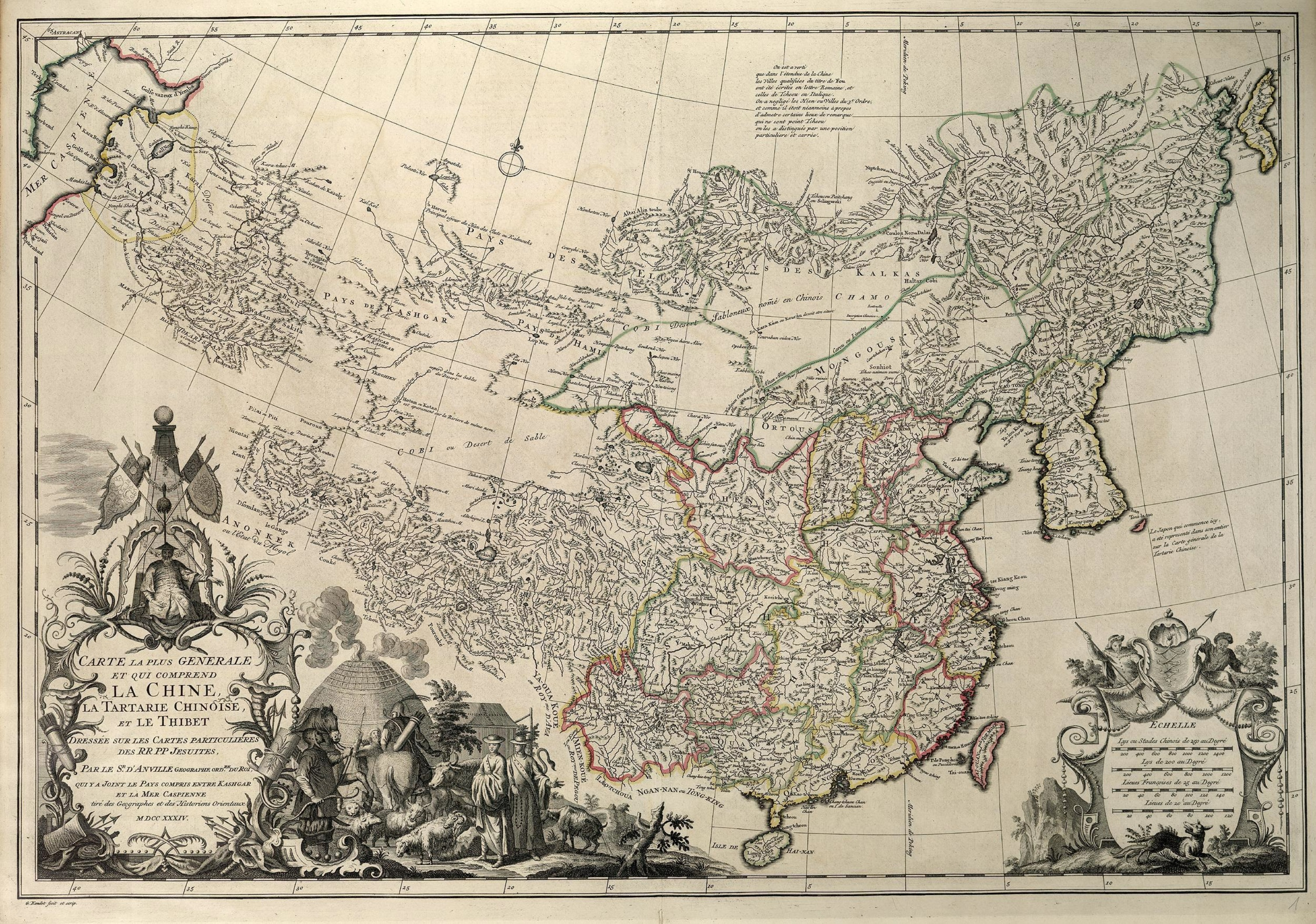
A 1734 Asia map, including China, Chinese Tartary, and Tibet, based on individual maps of the Jesuit fathers.

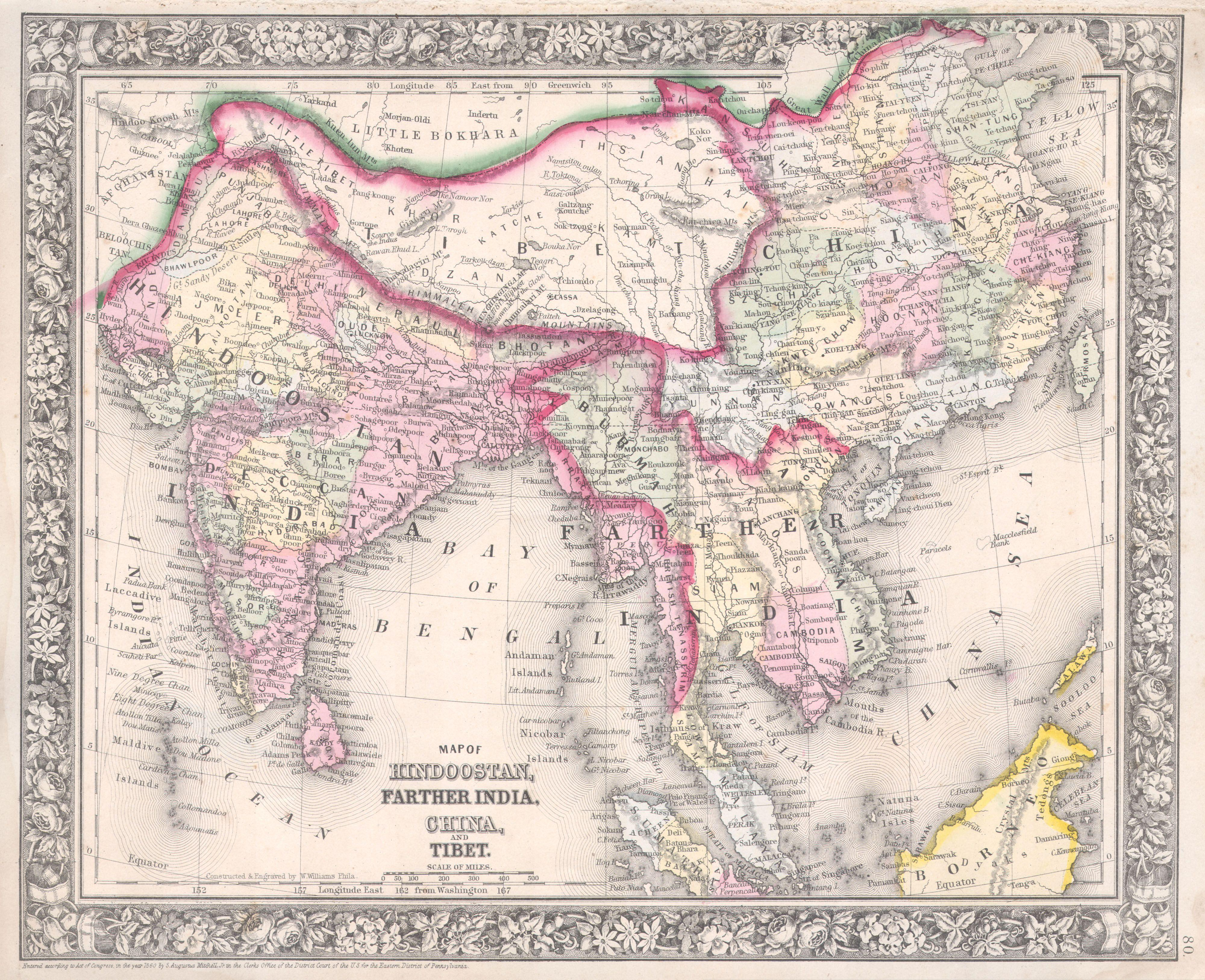
China and Tibet in 1864 by Samuel Augustus Mitchell

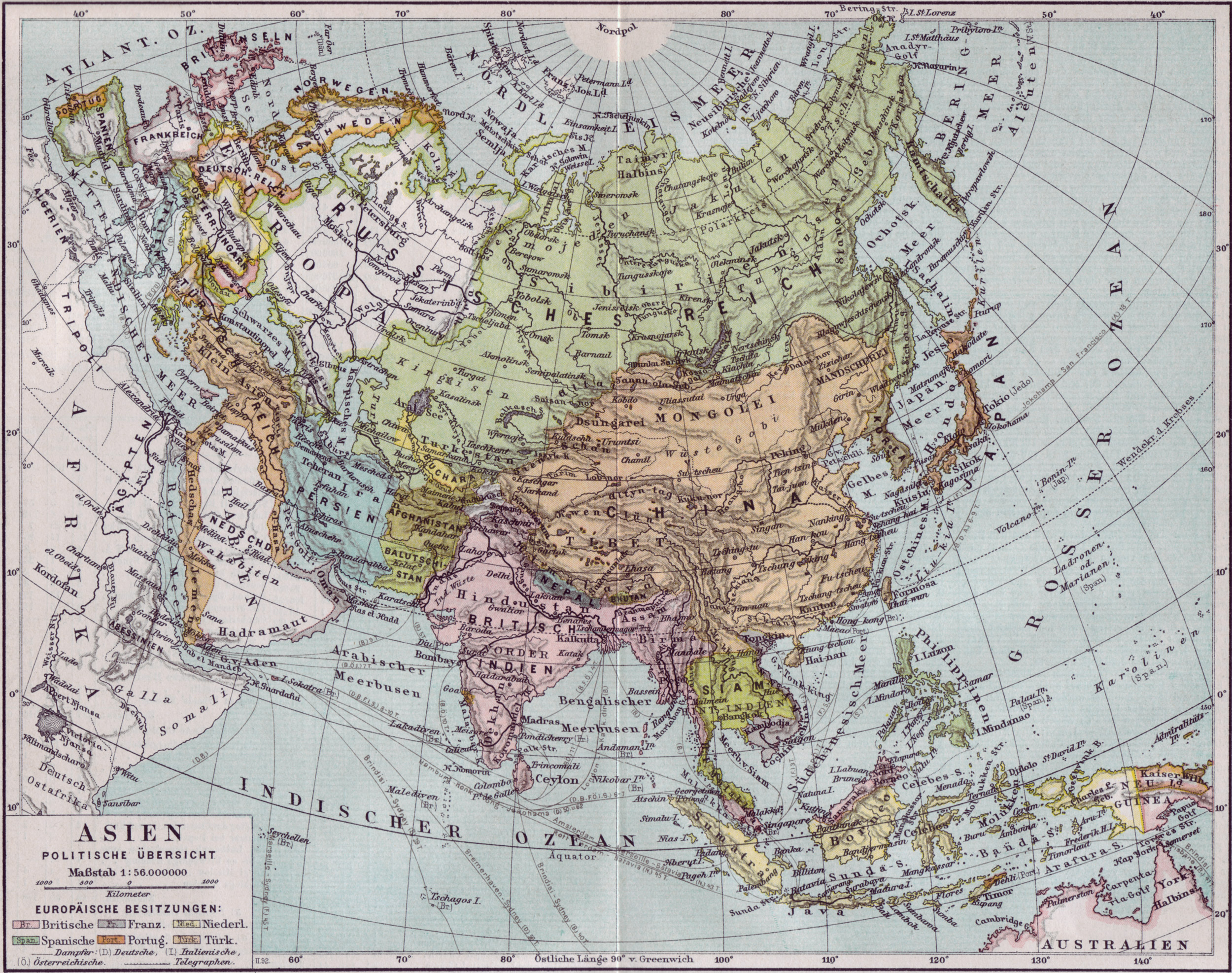
Political map of Asia in 1890, showing Tibet as part of China (Qing dynasty). The map was published in the Meyers Konversations-Lexikon in Leipzig in 1892.

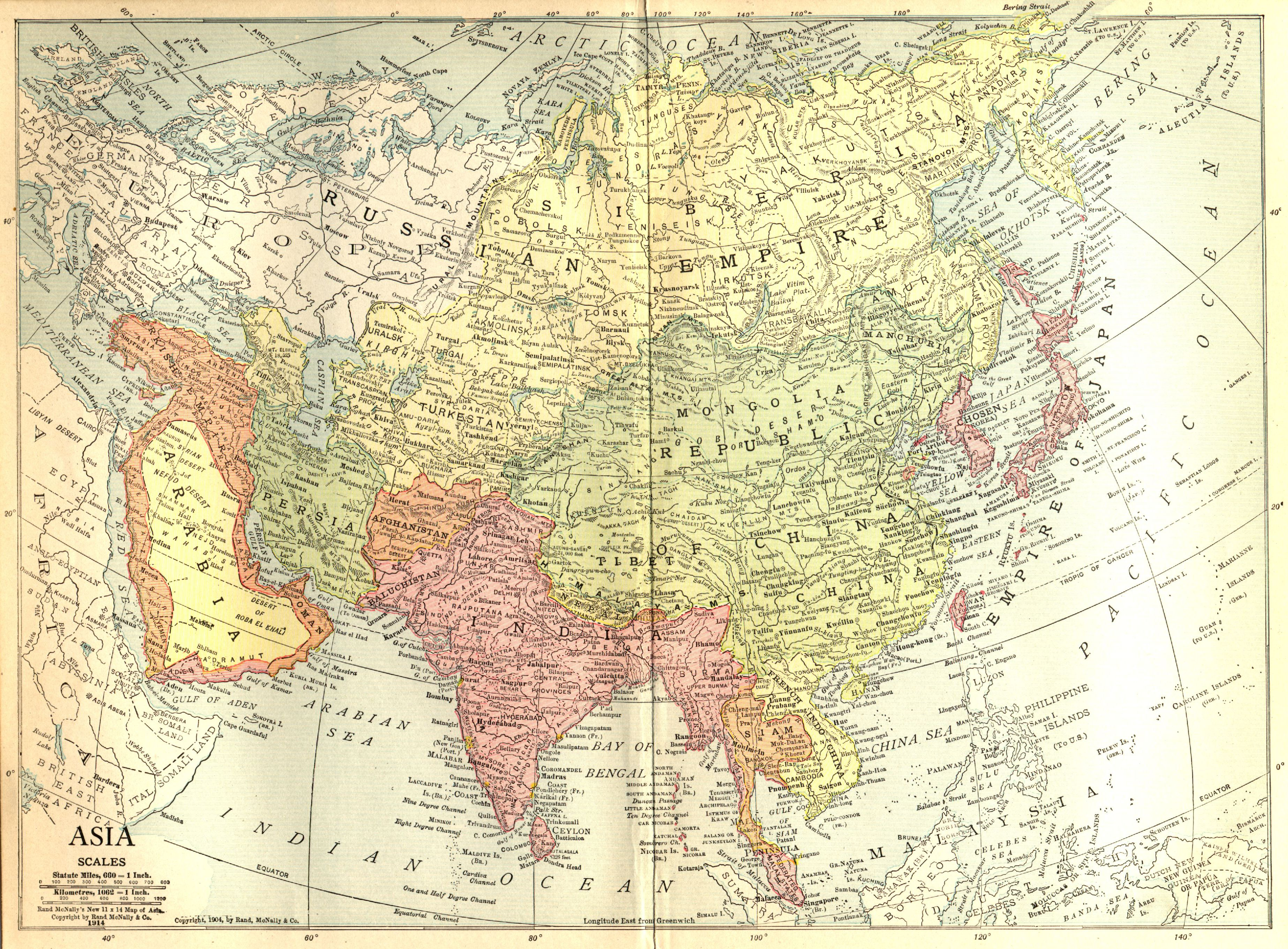
A Rand McNally map appended to the 1914 edition of The New Student's Reference Work shows Tibet as part of the Republic of China

The UN map of the world in 1945, shows Tibet and Taiwan as part of the Republic of China. However, this presentation does not correspond to any opinion of the UN.

The government of the People's Republic of China contends that China has had control over Tibet since the Yuan dynasty (1271–1368).

In 1912 the Imperial Edict of the Abdication of the Qing Emperor was issued in the name of the Xuantong Emperor, providing the legal right for the Republic of China (which previously ruled mainland China from 1912 until 1949 and now controls Taiwan) to inherit all territories of the Qing dynasty, including Tibet. The cabinet-level Mongolian and Tibetan Affairs Commission had existed and was in charge of the administration of Tibet and Outer Mongolia regions from 1912. The commission retained its cabinet-level status after 1949, but no longer executes that function. On 10 May 1943, Chiang Kai-shek asserted that "Tibet is part of Chinese territory... No foreign nation is allowed to interfere in our domestic affairs". He again declared in 1946 that the Tibetans were Chinese nationals. The Mongolian and Tibetan Affairs Commission was disbanded in 2017.

In the late 19th century, China adopted the Western model of nation-state diplomacy. As the government of Tibet, China concluded several treaties (1876, 1886, 1890, 1893) with the British Indian government touching on the status, boundaries and access to Tibet. Chinese government sources consider this a sign of sovereignty rather than suzerainty. However, by the 20th century British India found the treaties to be ineffective due to China's weakened control over the Tibetan local government. A British expeditionary force invaded Tibet in 1904 and mandated the signing of a separate treaty directly with the Tibetan government in Lhasa. In 1906, an Anglo-Chinese Convention was signed at Peking between Great Britain and China. It incorporated the 1904 Lhasa Convention (with modification), which was attached as Annex. A treaty between Britain and Russia followed in 1907. Article II of this treaty stated that "In conformity with the admitted principle of the suzerainty of China over Tibet, Great Britain and Russia engage not to enter into negotiations with Tibet except through the intermediary of the Chinese Government." China sent troops into Tibet in 1908. The result of the policy of both Great Britain and Russia has been the virtual annexation of Tibet by China. China controlled Tibet up to 1912. Thereafter, Tibet entered the period described commonly as de facto independence, though it was recognized only by independent Mongolia as enjoying de jure independence.

In the 2000s the position of the Republic of China with regard to Tibet appeared to become more nuanced, as expressed in the opening speech to the International Symposium on Human Rights in Tibet on 8 September 2007 by the then ROC President Chen Shui-bian (an advocate of Taiwan independence), who stated that his offices no longer treated exiled Tibetans as Chinese mainlanders.

=== Legal arguments based on Tibet's historic status ===
The position of the People's Republic of China (PRC), which has ruled mainland China since 1949, as well as the official position of the Republic of China (ROC), which ruled mainland China before 1949 and currently controls Taiwan, is that Tibet has been an indivisible part of China de jure since the Yuan dynasty of Mongol-ruled China in the 13th century, comparable to other states such as the Kingdom of Dali and the Tangut Empire that were also incorporated into China at the time.

The PRC contends that, according to international law and the Succession of states theory, all subsequent Chinese governments have succeeded the Yuan Dynasty in exercising de jure sovereignty over Tibet, with the PRC having succeeded the ROC as the legitimate government of all China.

=== De facto independence ===
The ROC government exercised no effective control over Tibet from 1912 to 1951; however, in the opinion of the Chinese government, this condition does not represent Tibet's independence as many other parts of China also enjoyed de facto independence when the Chinese nation was torn by warlordism, Japanese invasion, and civil war. Goldstein explains what is meant by de facto independence in the following statement:

...[Britain] instead adopted a policy based on the idea of autonomy for Tibet within the context of Chinese suzerainty, that is to say, de facto independence for Tibet in the context of token subordination to China. Britain articulated this policy in the Simla Convention of 1914.

While at times the Tibetans were fiercely independent-minded, at other times, Tibet indicated its willingness to accept subordinate status as part of China provided that Tibetan internal systems were left untouched and China relinquished control over a number of important ethnic Tibetan groups in Kham and Amdo. The PRC insists that during this period the ROC government continued to maintain sovereignty over Tibet. The Provisional Constitution of the Republic of China (1912) stipulated that Tibet was a province of the Republic of China. Provisions concerning Tibet in the Constitution of the Republic of China promulgated later all stress the inseparability of Tibet from Chinese territory, and the Central Government of China's exercise of sovereignty in Tibet. In 1927, the Commission in Charge of Mongolian and Tibetan Affairs of the Chinese Government contained members of great influence in the Mongolian and Tibetan areas, such as the 13th Dalai Lama, the 9th Panchen Lama and other Tibetan government representatives. In 1934, on his condolence mission following the demise of the Dalai Lama, the Chinese General Huang Musong posted notices in Chinese and Tibetan throughout Lhasa that alluded to Tibet as an integral part of China while expressing the utmost reverence for the Dalai Lama and the Buddhist religion.

The 9th Panchen Lama traditionally ruled over one-third of Tibet. On 1 February 1925, the Panchen Lama attended the preparatory session of the "National Reconstruction Meeting" (Shanhou huiyi) intended to identify ways and means of unifying the Chinese nation, and gave a speech about achieving the unification of five nationalities, including Tibetans, Mongolians and Han Chinese. In 1933, he called upon the Mongols to embrace national unity and to obey the Chinese Government to resist Japanese invasion. In February 1935, the Chinese government appointed the Panchen Lama as "Special Cultural Commissioner for the Western Regions" and assigned him 500 Chinese troops. He spent much of his time teaching and preaching Buddhist doctrines – including the principles of unity and pacification for the border regions – extensively in inland China, outside of Tibet, from 1924 until 1 December 1937, when he died on his way back to Tibet under the protection of Chinese troops.

During the Sino-Tibetan War of 1930–1932, the Chinese warlords Ma Bufang and Liu Wenhui jointly attacked and defeated invading Tibetan forces.

The Kuomintang government in China sought to portray itself as necessary to validate the choice of the Dalai Lama and Panchen Lama. When the current (14th) Dalai Lama was installed in Lhasa in 1939, it was with an armed escort of Chinese troops and an attending Chinese minister. The Muslim Kuomintang General Bai Chongxi called upon the Republic of China to expel the British from Tibet. According to Yu Shiyu, during the Second Sino-Japanese War, Chiang Kai-shek ordered the Chinese Muslim General Ma Bufang, Governor of Qinghai (1937–1949), to repair the Yushu airport in Qinghai Province to deter Tibetan independence. In May 1943, Chiang warned that Tibet must accept and follow the instructions and orders of the Central Government, that they must agree and help to build the Chinese-India [war-supply] road, and that they must maintain direct communications with the Office of the Mongolian and Tibetan Affairs Commission (MTAC) in Lhasa and not through the newly established "Foreign Office" of Tibet. He sternly warned that he would "send an air force to bomb Tibet immediately" should Tibet be found to be collaborating with Japan. Official Communications between Lhasa and Chiang Kai-shek's government was through MTAC, not the "Foreign Office", until July 1949, just before the Communists' victory in the civil war. The presence of MTAC in Lhasa was viewed by both Nationalist and Communist governments as an assertion of Chinese sovereignty over Tibet. Throughout the Kuomintang years, no country gave Tibet diplomatic recognition.

In 1950, after the People's Liberation Army invaded Tibet, Indian Prime Minister Jawaharlal Nehru stated that his country would continue the British policy with regards to Tibet in considering it to be outwardly part of China but internally autonomous.

Western influence would play an active part in shaping modern Chinese claims over Tibet. Ideas of nation-state depended on a state's preexisting status as sovereign. Western views on Chinese sovereignty would prove useful for China. From the Chinese perspective, Tibet was a state without sovereignty. As such, China could deny Tibetan calls for independence under a nation-state model since the state lacked sovereignty.

=== Foreign involvement ===
The PRC considers all pro-independence movements aimed at ending Chinese sovereignty in Tibet, including the CIA's backing of Tibetan insurgents during the 1950s and 1960s, and the establishment of the Government of Tibet in Exile at the end of the 20th century, as one extended campaign aimed at eroding Chinese territorial integrity and sovereignty, or destabilizing China itself.

== Views of the Tibetan government and the subsequent Tibetan government in exile ==
=== Government of Tibet (1912–1951) ===
Flag of Tibet between 1916 and 1951. This version was introduced by the 13th Dalai Lama in 1912. It sports two Snowlions amongst other elements and still continues to be used by the Tibet Government in Exile, but is outlawed in the People's Republic of China.

A proclamation issued by 13th Dalai Lama in 1913 states, "During the time of Genghis Khan and Altan Khan of the Mongols, the Ming dynasty of the Chinese, and the Qing dynasty of the Manchus, Tibet and China cooperated on the basis of benefactor and priest relationship. [...] the existing relationship between Tibet and China had been that of patron and priest and had not been based on the subordination of one to the other." He condemned that the "Chinese authorities in Szechuan and Yunnan endeavored to colonize our territory Chinese" in 1910–12 and stated that "We are a small, religious, and independent nation".

==== Tibetan passports ====
The Tibetan government issued passports to the first-ever Mount Everest expedition in 1921. The Tibetan government also issued passports to subsequent British Everest expedition in 1924 and 1936. The 1938–39 German expedition to Tibet also received Tibetan passports.

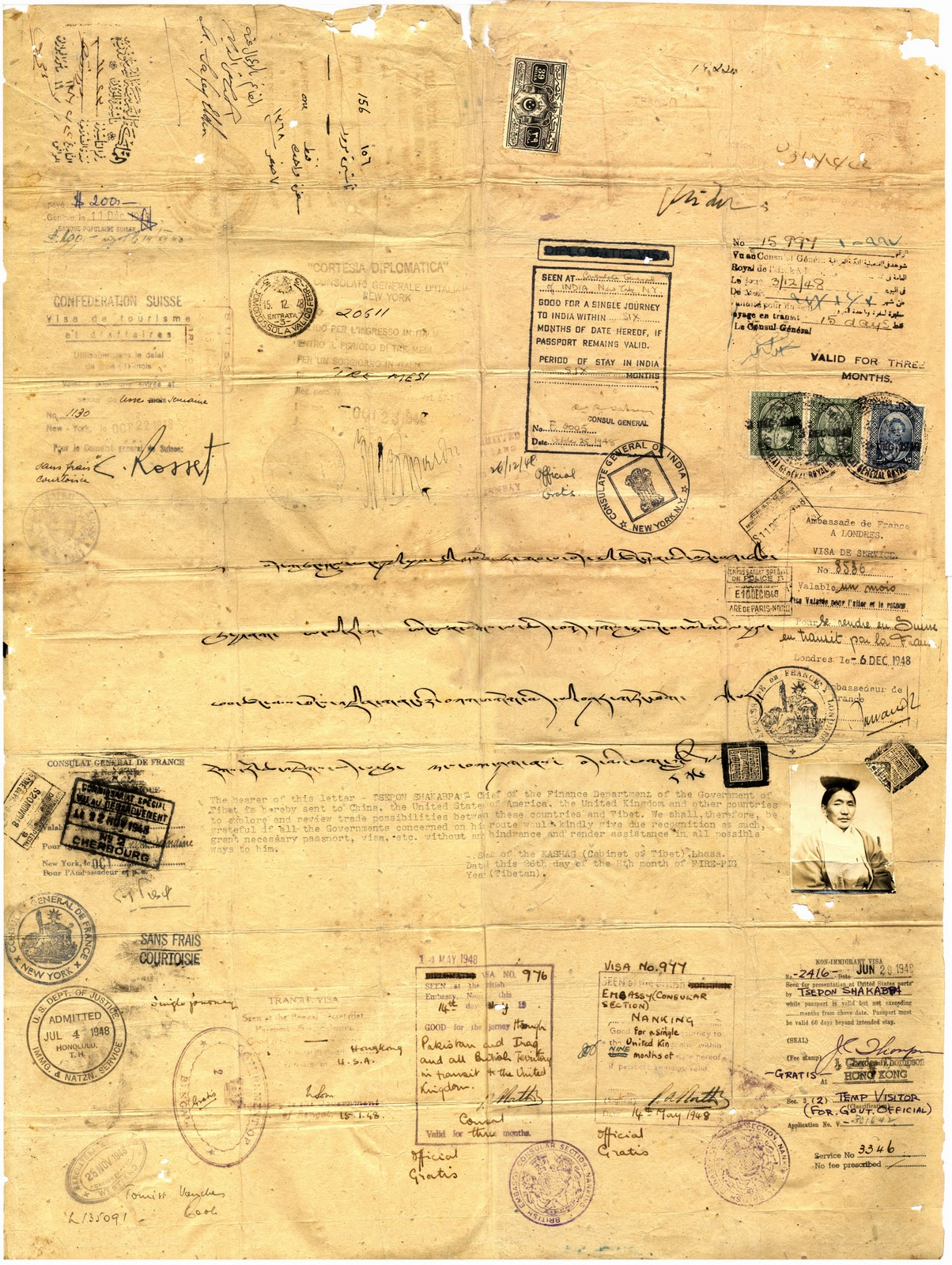
The passport of Tsepon W.D Shakabpa (Collection: Friends of Tibet Foundation)

In 2003, the passport belonging to Tsepon W.D Shakabpa was rediscovered in Nepal by Friends of Tibet Foundation. Issued by the Kashag to Tibet's finance minister Tsepon Shakabpa for foreign travel, the passport was a single piece of pink paper, complete with photograph. It has a message in hand-written Tibetan and typed English, similar to the message by the nominal issuing officers of today's passports, stating that ""the bearer of this letter – Tsepon Shakabpa, Chief of the Finance Department of the Government of Tibet, is hereby sent to China, the United States of America, the United Kingdom and other countries to explore and review trade possibilities between these countries and Tibet. We shall, therefore, be grateful if all the Governments concerned on his route would kindly give due recognition as such, grant necessary passport, visa, etc. without any hindrance and render assistance in all possible ways to him." The text and the photograph is sealed by a square stamp belonging to the Kashag, and is dated "26th day of the 8th month of Fire-Pig year (Tibetan)" (14 October 1947 in the gregorian calendar).

The passport has received visas and entry stamps from several countries and territories, including India, the United States, the United Kingdom, France, Italy, Switzerland, Pakistan, Iraq and Hong Kong, but not China. Some visa do reflect an official status, with mentions such as "Diplomatic courtesy, Service visa, Official gratis, Diplomatic visa, For government official".

=== Tibetan Government in exile (post 1959) ===
In 1959, the 14th Dalai Lama fled Tibet and established a government in exile at Dharamsala in northern India. This group claims sovereignty over various ethnically or historically Tibetan areas now governed by China. Aside from the Tibet Autonomous Region, an area that was administered directly by the Dalai Lama's government until 1951, the group also claims Amdo (Qinghai) and eastern Kham (western Sichuan). About 45 percent of ethnic Tibetans under Chinese rule live in the Tibet Autonomous Region, according to the 2000 census. Prior to 1949, much of Amdo and eastern Kham were governed by local rulers and even warlords.

The view of the current Dalai Lama in 1989 was as follows:

During the 5th Dalai Lama's time [1617–1682], I think it was quite evident that we were a separate sovereign nation with no problems. The 6th Dalai Lama [1683–1706] was spiritually pre-eminent, but politically, he was weak and uninterested. He could not follow the 5th Dalai Lama's path. This was a great failure. So, then the Chinese influence increased. During this time, the Tibetans showed quite a deal of respect to the Chinese. But even during these times, the Tibetans never regarded Tibet as a part of China. All the documents were very clear that China, Mongolia and Tibet were all separate countries. Because the Chinese emperor was powerful and influential, the small nations accepted the Chinese power or influence. You cannot use the previous invasion as evidence that Tibet belongs to China. In the Tibetan mind, regardless of who was in power, whether it was the Manchus [the Qing dynasty], the Mongols [the Yuan dynasty] or the Chinese, the east of Tibet was simply referred to as China. In the Tibetan mind, India and China were treated the same; two separate countries.

The International Commission of Jurists concluded that from 1913 to 1950 Tibet demonstrated the conditions of statehood as generally accepted under international law. In the opinion of the commission, the government of Tibet conducted its own domestic and foreign affairs free from any outside authority, and countries with whom Tibet had foreign relations are shown by official documents to have treated Tibet in practice as an independent State.

The United Nations General Assembly passed resolutions urging respect for the rights of Tibetans in 1959, 1961, and 1965. The 1961 resolution calls for that "principle of self-determination of peoples and nations" applies to the Tibetan people.

The Tibetan Government in Exile views current PRC rule in Tibet, including neighboring provinces outside Tibet Autonomous Region, as colonial and illegitimate, motivated solely by the natural resources and strategic value of Tibet, and in gross violation of both Tibet's historical status as an independent country and the right of Tibetan people to self-determination. It also points to PRC's autocratic policies, divide-and-rule policies, and what it contends are assimilationist policies, and regard those as an example of ongoing imperialism aimed at destroying Tibet's distinct ethnic makeup, culture, and identity, thereby cementing it as an indivisible part of China. That said, in 2005, the Dalai Lama said that "Tibet is a part of the People's Republic of China. It is an autonomous region of the People's Republic of China. Tibetan culture and Buddhism are part of Chinese culture. Many young Chinese like Tibetan culture as a tradition of China". The Dalai Lama also stated in 2008 that he wishes only for Tibetan autonomy, and not separation from China, under certain conditions, like freedom of speech and expression, genuine self-rule, and control over ethnic makeup and migration in all areas claimed as historical Tibet.

The Middle-Way policy was adopted unanimously by the 4th session of the 12th Assembly of Tibetan People's Deputies on September 18, 1997. It was proposed by the 14th Dalai Lama "to peacefully resolve the issue of Tibet and to bring about stability and co-existence between the Tibetan and Chinese peoples based on equality and mutual co-operation. It is also a policy adopted democratically by the Central Tibetan Administration and the Tibetan people through a series of discussions held over a long time." In short, the Middle-Way Approach policy states that

"The Tibetan people do not accept the present status of Tibet under the People's Republic of China. At the same time, they do not seek independence for Tibet, which is a historical fact. Treading a middle path in between these two lies the policy and means to achieve a genuine autonomy for all Tibetans living in the three traditional provinces of Tibet within the framework of the People's Republic of China. This is called the Middle-Way Approach, a non-partisan and moderate position that safeguards the vital interests of all concerned parties-for Tibetans: the protection and preservation of their culture, religion and national identity; for the Chinese: the security and territorial integrity of the motherland; and for neighbours and other third parties: peaceful borders and international relations."

== Third-party views ==
During the Tang dynasty (618–907), the Tibetan Empire and the Tang dynasty were frequently at war, with parts of Tibet temporarily captured by the Tang to become part of their territory. Around 650, the Tang captured Lhasa. In 763, the Tibetan Empire very briefly took the Tang capital of Chang'an.

Luciano Petech, a scholar of Himalayan history, indicated that Tibet's political subordination to China, at least nominally, can date back to the Yuan (1271–1368) and the Ming (1368–1644) dynasties. Most scholars outside of China say that during the Ming dynasty (1368–1644), the Chinese Empire possessed no administrative control over Tibet. In contrast, since the mid-18th century it is agreed that China had control over Tibet reaching its maximum in the end of the 18th century. Melvyn Goldstein, an American Tibetologist, has pointed out that "there can be no question regarding the subordination of Tibet to Manchu-ruled China following...the first decades of the eighteenth century." Zahiruddin Ahmed's China and Tibet, 1708–1959: A Résumé of Facts states that "Chinese Imperial authority in Tibet was, no doubt, indistinguishable from sovereignty." Luciano Petech indicated that Tibet was a Qing protectorate and Beijing effectively, since 1792, participated the internal governance of Tibet.

The patron and priest relationship held between the Manchu Qing Emperors and the Tibetan Lamas has been subjected to varying interpretation. The 13th Dalai Lama, for example, knelt, but did not kowtow, before the Empress Dowager Cixi and the young Emperor while he delivered his petition in Beijing. Chinese sources emphasize the submission of kneeling; Tibetan sources emphasize the lack of the kowtow. Titles and commands given to Tibetans by the Chinese, likewise, are variously interpreted. The Qing authorities gave the 13th Dalai Lama the title of "Loyally Submissive Vice-Regent", and ordered to follow Qing's commands and communicate with the Emperor only through the Manchu Amban in Lhasa; but opinions vary as to whether these titles and commands reflected actual political power, or symbolic gestures ignored by Tibetans. Some authors claim that kneeling before the Emperor followed the 17th-century precedent in the case of the 5th Dalai Lama. Laird Thomas' The Story Of Tibet, published in 2006, says that the Chinese emperor treated the Dalai Lama as an equal.

Some scholars indicate that British recognition of Tibet's subordination to Beijing, through treaties, can date back to 1876. Melvyn Goldstein writes that Britain and Russia formally acknowledged Chinese authority over Tibet in treaties of 1906 and 1907; and that the British expedition to Tibet in 1903–1904 stirred China into becoming more directly involved in Tibetan affairs and working to further integrate Tibet with "the rest of China." Warren Smith's Tibetan Nation: A History of Tibetan Nationalism even admits that the Anglo-Chinese Convention of 1906 is itself a recognition of Chinese sovereignty over Tibet.

The status of Tibet after the 1911 Xinhai Revolution ended the Qing dynasty is also a matter of debate. After the revolution, the Chinese Republic of five races, including Tibetans, was proclaimed. Western powers recognized the Chinese Republic, however the 13th Dalai Lama proclaimed Tibet's independence. Some authors indicate that personal allegiance of the Dalai Lama to the Manchu Emperor came to an end and no new type of allegiance of Tibet to China was established, or that Tibet had relationships with the empire and not with the new nation-state of China. Barnett observes that there is no document before 1950 in which Tibet explicitly recognizes Chinese sovereignty, and considers Tibet's subordination to China during the periods when China had most authority comparable to that of a colony. Tibetologist Elliot Sperling noted that the Tibetan term for China, Rgya-nag, did not mean anything more than a country bordering Tibet from the east, and did not include Tibet.

Other Tibetologists write that no country publicly accepts Tibet as an independent state, although there are several instances of government officials appealing to their superiors to do so. Treaties signed by Britain and Russia in the early years of the 20th century, and others signed by Nepal and India in the 1950s, recognized Tibet's political subordination to China. The United States presented a similar viewpoint in 1922, 1943 and 1948, expressing its recognition of Tibet's subordination to the Republic of China. Goldstein also says that a 1943 British official letter "reconfirmed that Britain considered Tibet as part of China." In the second volume of his A History of Modern Tibet, Goldstein notes that PRC's core aim was "inducing Tibet to accept Chinese sovereignty and the military occupation of Tibet — while also giving the Tibetan side a number of major concessions regarding the continuation of the traditional theocracy."

The United States government maintains that no country recognizes Tibet as a sovereign state, and German scholar Thomas Heberer wrote: "No country in the world has ever recognized the independence of Tibet or declared that Tibet is an 'occupied country'. For all countries in the world, Tibet is Chinese territory." Instances exist when a number of unrecognized entities or organizations express their recognition of Tibet, including, in 2008, the micronation of Ladonia and, in the early 1910s, the similarly unrecognized Bogd Khanate of Mongolia, which declared independence from China together with Tibet just after the fall of the Qing dynasty and signed a treaty of mutual recognition, although the 13th Dalai Lama denied any official approval of the said treaty.

During the early 1990s legistrative bodies, including the European Parliament and United States Congress, and other international organisations declared that Tibetans lacked the enjoyment of self-determination to which they are entitled and that it is an occupied territory.

Under the terms of the Simla Convention, the British government's position was that China held suzerainty over Tibet but not full sovereignty. By 2008, it was the only state still to hold this view. David Miliband, the British Foreign Secretary, described the previous position as an anachronism originating in the geopolitics of the early 20th century. Britain revised this view on 29 October 2008, when it recognised Chinese sovereignty over Tibet by issuing a statement on its website. The Economist reported at that time that although the British Foreign Office's website did not use the word sovereignty, officials at the Foreign Office said "it means that, as far as Britain is concerned, 'Tibet is part of China. Full stop.'"

In 2008, European Union leader José Manuel Barroso stated that the EU recognized Tibet as integral part of China: On 1 April 2009, the French Government reaffirmed its position on the Tibet issue.

In 2014, U.S. President Barack Obama stated that "We recognize Tibet as part of the People's Republic of China. We are not in favor of independence."

This lack of legal recognition makes it difficult for international legal experts sympathetic to the Tibetan Government in Exile to argue that Tibet formally established its independence. On the other hand, in 1959 and 1960, the International Commission of Jurists concluded that Tibet had been independent between 1913 and 1950.

While Canadian foreign policy and Canada's policy toward Tibet is strictly limited to supporting human rights, Canada has nonetheless recognized that the Tibetan people's human rights expressly include their right to self-determination.

=== Genocide allegations ===
Groups such as the Madrid-based Committee to Support Tibet claim that since the People's Liberation Army's invasion of Tibet in 1950, the death toll in Tibet has been 1,200,000 and they have filed official charges of genocide against prominent Chinese leaders and officials. This figure has been disputed by Patrick French, a supporter of the Tibetan cause who was able to view the data and the calculations, instead, he concludes that a no less devastating death toll of half a million people was a direct result of Chinese policies.

According to an ICJ (International Commission of Jurists) report released in 1960, there was no "sufficient proof of the destruction of Tibetans as a race, nation or ethnic group as such by methods that can be regarded as genocide in international law" found in Tibet.

=== Other rights ===
The government of the PRC argues that the Tibetan authority which existed under the rule of successive Dalai Lamas was also a human rights violator. The old society of Tibet was a serfdom and, according to reports of an early English explorer, had remnants of "a very mild form of slavery" prior to the 13th Dalai Lama's reforms of 1913.

The Tibetologist Robert Barnett wrote that the clerics based their resistance to the introduction of anything which might disturb the prevailing power structure on their belief that it was Anti-Buddhist. For example, the clergy obstructed modernization attempts by the 13th Dalai Lama.

The Buddhist-dominated society of Old Tibet had a long history of persecuting Christians and other non-Buddhists. In 1630 and 1742, Tibetan Christian communities were suppressed by the lamas of the Gelugpa Sect, whose chief lama was the Dalai Lama. Jesuit priests were imprisoned in 1630 or they were attacked before they reached Tsaparang. Between 1850 and 1880, eleven fathers of the Paris Foreign Mission Society were murdered in Tibet, or they were killed or injured during their journeys to other missionary outposts in the Sino-Tibetan borderlands. In 1881, Father Brieux was reportedly murdered while he was travelling to Lhasa. Qing officials later discovered that the murderers were covertly supported and the crimes which they committed were even orchestrated by the patrons of local lamaseries — the native chieftains. In 1904, the Qing official Feng Quan sought to curtail the influence of the Gelugpa Sect and he also ordered the protection of Western missionaries and their churches. Indignation with Feng Quan and indignation with the Christian presence in Tibet both escalated until they reached a climax in March 1905, when thousands of Batang lamas revolted, killing Feng, his entourage, local Manchu and Han Chinese officials, and the local French Catholic priests. The revolt soon spread to other cities in eastern Tibet, such as Chamdo, Litang and Nyarong, and at one point, it almost spilled over into neighboring Sichuan Province. The missionary stations and the churches which were located in these areas were burned and destroyed by the angry Gelugpa monks and the local chieftains. Dozens of Westerners who lived in these areas, including at least four priests, were killed or fatally wounded. The scale of the rebellion was tremendous, so the revolt did not gradually come to an end until panicked Qing authorities pacified the mobs by hurriedly sending 2,000 troops from Sichuan. In Tibet, the hostility towards the Western missionaries which was prevalent among the lamasery authorities and the local native chieftains' lingered through the last throes of the Qing dynasty and it also lingered into the Republican period.

Three UN resolutions of 1959, 1961, and 1965 condemned human rights violation in Tibet. These resolutions were passed at a time when the PRC was not permitted to become a member and of course was not allowed to present its singular version of events in the region (however, the Republic of China on Taiwan, which the PRC also claims sovereignty over, was a member of the UN at the time, and it equally claimed sovereignty over Tibet and opposed Tibetan self-determination). Professor and sinologist A. Tom Grunfeld called the resolutions impractical and justified the PRC in ignoring them.

Grunfeld questioned Human Rights Watch reports on human rights abuses in Tibet, saying they distorted the big picture.

According to Barnett, since the United States and other Western powers used the Tibet issue for cold war political purposes in the 1950s and 1960s, the PRC is now able to get support from developing countries and use it to defeat the United Nations' last nine attempts to pass resolutions which are critical of China. Barnett writes that the position of the Chinese in Tibet should be more accurately characterized as a colonial occupation, and he also writes that such an approach might cause developing nations to be more supportive of the Tibetan cause.

The Chinese government ignores the issue of its alleged violations of Tibetan human rights, and prefers to argue that the invasion was about territorial integrity and unity of the State. Furthermore, Tibetan activists inside Tibet have until recently focused on independence, not human rights.

Leaders of the Tibetan Youth Congress which claims a strength of over 30,000 members are alleged by China to advocate violence. In 1998, Barnett wrote that India's military includes 10,000 Tibetans, a fact that has been causing China some unease. He further wrote that "at least seven bombs exploded in Tibet between 1995 and 1997, one of them laid by a monk, and a significant number of individual Tibetans are known to be actively seeking the taking up of arms; hundreds of Chinese soldiers and police have been beaten during demonstrations in Tibet, and at least one killed in cold blood, probably several more."

On 23 March 2008, there was a bombing incident in the Qambo prefecture.

=== Self-determination ===
Even though the oldest ROC constitutional documents claim that Tibet is a part of China, Chinese political leaders acknowledged the principle of self-determination. For example, at a party conference in 1924, Kuomintang leader Sun Yat-sen issued a statement which advocated the right of self-determination for all Chinese ethnic groups: "The Kuomintang can state with solemnity that it recognizes the right of self-determination of all national minorities in China and it will organize a free and united Chinese republic." Complete secession of Tibet was then rejected and the policy was enforced in the unaltered ROC constitution passed by the nationalist government that stated in Article 3 that all Tibetans "possessing the nationality of the Republic of China" shall be citizens of the ROC while Articles 4 and 5 reaffirmed that any territories "shall not be altered" unless the resolution is approved by the National Assembly and all racial groups are equal.

In 1931, the CCP issued a constitution for the short-lived Chinese Soviet Republic which states that Tibetans and other ethnic minorities, "may either join the Union of Chinese Soviets or secede from it." It is notable that China was in a state of civil war at the time and that the "Chinese Soviets" only represents a faction. Saying that Tibet may secede from the "Chinese Soviets" does not mean that it can secede from China. The quote above is merely a statement of Tibetans' freedom to choose their political orientation. The possibility of complete secession was denied by Communist leader Mao Zedong in 1938: "They must have the right to self-determination and at the same time they should continue to unite with the Chinese people to form one nation". This policy was codified in PRC's first constitution which, in Article 3, reaffirmed China as a "single multi-national state," while the "national autonomous areas are inalienable parts". The Chinese government insists that the United Nations documents, which codifies the principle of self-determination, provides that the principle shall not be abused in disrupting territorial integrity: "Any attempt aimed at the partial or total disruption of the national unity and the territorial integrity of a country is incompatible with the purposes and principles of the Charter of the United Nations...."

=== Legitimacy ===
The PRC also points to what it claims are the autocratic, oppressive and theocratic policies of the government of Tibet before 1959, its toleration of existence of serfdom and slaves, its so-called "renunciation" of (Arunachal Pradesh) and its association with India and other foreign countries, and as such claims the Government of Tibet in Exile has no legitimacy to govern Tibet and no credibility or justification in criticizing PRC's policies.

China claims that the People's Liberation Army's march into Tibet in 1951 was not without the support of the Tibetan people, including the 10th Panchen Lama. Ian Buruma writes:

...It is often forgotten that many Tibetans, especially educated people in the larger towns, were so keen to modernize their society in the mid-20th century that they saw the Chinese communists as allies against rule by monks and serf-owning landlords. The Dalai Lama himself, in the early 1950s, was impressed by Chinese reforms and wrote poems praising Chairman Mao.

Instances have been documented when the PRC government gained support from a significant portion of the Tibetan population, including monastic leaders, monks, nobility and ordinary Tibetans prior to the crackdown in the 1959 uprising. The PRC government and many Tibetan leaders characterize PLA's operation as a peaceful liberation of Tibetans from a "feudal serfdom system." (和平解放西藏).

When Tibet complained to the United Nations through El Salvador about Chinese invasion in November 1950—after Chinese forces entered Chamdo (or Qamdo) when Tibet failed to respond by the deadline to China's demand for negotiation-- members debated about it but refused to admit the "Tibet Question" into the agenda of the U.N. General Assembly. Key stakeholder India told the General Assembly that "the Peking Government had declared that it had not abandoned its intention to settle the difficulties by peaceful means", and that "the Indian Government was certain that the Tibet Question could still be settled by peaceful means". The Russian delegate said that "China's sovereignty over Tibet had been recognized for a long time by the United Kingdom, the United States, and the U.S.S.R." The United Nations postponed this matter on the grounds that Tibet was officially an "autonomous nationality region belonging to territorial China", and because the outlook of peaceful settlement seemed good.

Subsequently, The Agreement Between the Central Government and the Local Government of Tibet on Method for the Peaceful Liberation of Tibet, also known as Seventeen-Point Agreement, was signed between delegates of China and Tibet on 23 May 1951. The Dalai Lama, despite the massive Chinese military presence, had ample time and opportunity to repudiate and denounce the Seventeen-Point Agreement. He was encouraged and instigated to do so with promise of public but not military support by the US, which by now had become hostile to Communist-ruled China.

On May 29, the 10th Panchen Erdeni (i.e. 10th Panchen Lama) and the Panchen Kampus Assembly made a formal statement, expressing their heartfelt support for the agreement. The statement indicated their resolution to guarantee the correct implementation of the agreement and to realize solidarity between the different ethnic groups of China and ethnic solidarity among the Tibetans; and on May 30, the 10th Panchen Erdeni telegrammed the 14th Dalai Lama, expressing his hope for unity and his vow to support the 14th Dalai Lama and the government of Tibet with the implementation of the agreement under the guidance of the Central Government and Chairman Mao.

The Agreement was finally accepted by Tibet's National Assembly, which then advised the Dalai Lama to accept it. Finally, on 24 October 1951, the Dalai Lama dispatched a telegram to Mao Zedong:

The Tibet Local Government as well as the ecclesiastic and secular People unanimously support this agreement, and under the leadership of Chairman Mao and the Central People's Government, will actively support the People's Liberation Army in Tibet to consolidate defence, drive out imperialist influences from Tibet and safeguard the unification of the territory and sovereignty of the Motherland.

On 28 October 1951, the Panchen Rinpoche [i.e. Panchen Lama] made a similar public statement accepting the agreement. He urged the "people of Shigatse to give active support" to carrying out the agreement.

Tsering Shakya writes about the general acceptance of the Tibetans toward the Seventeen-Point Agreement, and its legal significance:

The most vocal supporters of the agreement came from the monastic community...As a result many Tibetans were willing to accept the agreement....Finally there were strong factions in Tibet who felt that the agreement was acceptable...this section was led by the religious community...In the Tibetans' view their independence was not a question of international legal status, but as Dawa Norbu writes, "Our sense of independence was based on the independence of our way of life and culture, which was more real to the unlettered masses than law or history, canons by which the non-Tibetans decide the fate of Tibet...This was the first formal agreement between Tibet and Communist China and it established the legal basis for Chinese rule in Tibet."

On March 28, 1959, premier Zhou Enlai signed the order of the PRC State Council on the uprising in Tibet, accusing the Tibetan government of disrupting the Agreement. (see, for review). The creation of the TAR finally buried the Agreement that was discarded back in 1959.

On April 18, 1959, the Dalai Lama published a statement in Tezpur, India, that gave his reasons for escaping to India. He pointed out that the 17 Point Agreement was signed under compulsion, and that later "the Chinese side permanently violated it". According to Michael Van Walt Van Praag, "treaties and similar agreements concluded under the use or threat of force are invalid under international law ab initio". According to this interpretation, this Agreement would not be considered legal by those who consider Tibet to have been an independent state before its signing, but would be considered legal by those who acknowledge China's sovereignty over Tibet prior to the treaty. Other accounts, such as those of Tibetologist Melvyn Goldstein, argue that under international law the threat of military action does not invalidate a treaty. According to Goldstein, the legitimacy of the treaty hinges on the signatories having full authority to finalise such an agreement; whether they did is up for debate.

== See also ==
- Tibet
- Tibetan culture
- History of Tibet
- Annexation of Tibet by the People's Republic of China
- History of Tibet (1950–present)
- Antireligious campaigns in China#Tibetan Buddhists
- Foreign relations of Tibet
- Freedom of religion in China#Tibetan Buddhism
- Genocide of Indigenous peoples#Tibet
- Human rights in China#Tibetan Buddhism
- Human rights in Tibet
- Penal system in China
  - Labour camps in Tibet
  - List of prisons in the Tibet Autonomous Region
- Sinicization of Tibet
- Central Tibetan Administration
- Tibetan diaspora
- Tibetan independence movement
- Patron and priest relationship
- South Tibet
- Ngapoi Ngawang Jigme
- Protests and uprisings in Tibet since 1950
- Tibet flag case
- Seventeen Point Agreement
