= Lhasa Prison (Utritru/Utritu) =

Prison in Lhasa, Tibet Autonomous Region, China

- Interactive map of Lhasa Prison
- Location: Duodi, northern Lhasa, Tibet Autonomous Region, China; 29.6850411°N 91.15916768°E
- Status: Operational
- Opened: March 1965 (institutional predecessor)

Lhasa Prison (Chinese: 西藏拉萨监狱; pinyin: Xīzàng Lāsà Jiānyù) is a prison in the northern outskirts of Lhasa, Tibet Autonomous Region, China. The institution traces its administrative history to 1965, while the prison facility identified in Tibetan and human-rights sources as Utritu or Utritru was completed by 1988.

Utritu is described by the International Campaign for Tibet as a Tibetanised form of the Chinese name Wuzhidui (五支队), meaning "Number Five Detachment" or "Number Five Unit". Other sources romanise the name as Utritru, Outridu or Authitu.

Human-rights sources identify Utritu as historically forming part of the wider Sangyip Prison Complex. The present Lhasa Prison is a separate institution from the Tibet Autonomous Region Prison, commonly known as Drapchi Prison. Contemporary Tibet Autonomous Region government records list the two prisons separately.

== History ==
According to a 2011 profile in the Tibet Legal Daily, the institutional predecessor of Lhasa Prison was established in March 1965 as the Construction Team of the Re-education Through Labour Office of the Preparatory Committee of the Tibet Autonomous Region (自治区筹委会劳教处建筑队).

During administrative restructuring in the early 1980s, the construction team was merged with the First Labour-Reform Detachment, Fifth Labour-Reform Detachment and the Labour-Reform Bureau's vehicle unit. The combined organisation was transferred to the Tibet Autonomous Region Public Security Department and became the Tibet Autonomous Region Public Security Department First Labour-Reform Team (西藏自治区公安厅第一劳改队).

In March 1992, the organisation was transferred from the Public Security Department to the Tibet Autonomous Region Department of Justice. In 1994 it was renamed Tibet Autonomous Region Sangyi Prison (西藏自治区桑伊监狱), and in 1995 it was renamed Tibet Autonomous Region Lhasa Prison (西藏自治区拉萨监狱).

This institutional history helps distinguish the date of the prison organisation from the construction of the facility known as Utritu. The International Campaign for Tibet states that Utritu was completed by 1988 and subsequently became increasingly referred to as Lhasa Prison.

== Utritu and the Sangyip complex ==
Human Rights Watch described Wuzhidui (五支队), which it rendered in Tibetanised form as Outridu, as one of several detention facilities within the Sangyip complex in northeastern Lhasa. In its 1996 report, Human Rights Watch described Outridu as formerly operating as a reform-through-labour facility and subsequently as a re-education-through-labour facility.

Human Rights Watch reported that Wuzhidui had held many people detained following the unrest in Lhasa in 1989. Most of its known political prisoners were transferred to the newly established Trisam re-education-through-labour facility in 1992. The report suggested that the transfer may have followed a protest by prisoners at Sangyip on 20 May 1991.

The International Campaign for Tibet similarly identifies Utritu as part of the group of facilities historically known collectively as Sangyip. In 2018, ICT stated that Utritu had not generally been a major centre for political imprisonment in more recent periods, although it had been used when additional cells or solitary-confinement facilities were required.

The terminology surrounding the complex has caused confusion in published sources. Sangyip has variously been used for the wider group of detention facilities and for particular institutions within it, while Utritu/Utritru, Outridu and Wuzhidui have been used for the facility subsequently identified as Lhasa Prison.

== Location and development ==
The 2011 Tibet Legal Daily profile places Lhasa Prison in the Duodi Valley (夺底沟) on the northern outskirts of Lhasa, approximately 6 kilometres (3.7 mi) from the city centre.

A 2021 investigation by the Tibet Research Project used satellite imagery, historical photographs and mapping services to geolocate Utritru/Lhasa Prison at approximately 29.6850411°N, 91.15916768°E. The project distinguished the facility from nearby Drapchi Prison and Sitru, the Tibet Autonomous Region-level Public Security detention centre.

The Tibet Research Project reported that satellite imagery showed several phases of redevelopment within the prison. A section containing three large buildings appeared in imagery in 2013, with additional perimeter walls and watchtowers appearing in 2014. The project also identified a separate secured facility immediately west of Lhasa Prison which it considered possibly associated with Utritru or the wider Sangyip complex, although its institutional identity was not established.

In 2023, RAND Europe used the Tibet Research Project's publicly available dataset of 83 identified detention facilities as the starting point for a wider satellite-imagery and night-time-lighting analysis of prisons and detention centres in the Tibet Autonomous Region.

A 2025 land-use planning register published by the Lhasa Municipal Natural Resources Bureau recorded a permit for Lhasa Prison covering 228,084 square metres of land classified for security use, east of Zangre North Road and south of the North Ring Road.

== Current operation ==
Lhasa Prison remains an operating prison within the Tibet Autonomous Region justice system. Official guidance published by the Tibet Autonomous Region Prison Administration in 2023 separately lists Lhasa Prison and provides contact information for relatives of prisoners wishing to arrange visits or remit money.

Official procurement records continue to use the name 西藏拉萨监狱 (Xizang Lhasa Prison). A January 2026 procurement notice, for example, concerned the prison's annual bulk-material purchasing programme.

== See also ==
- Sangyip Prison Complex
- Drapchi Prison
- Trisam Prison
- Qushui Prison
- Bomi Prison
- List of prisons in the Tibet Autonomous Region
