= Jigme Gyatso (Tibetan independence activist) =

Tibetan independence activist (born 1961)

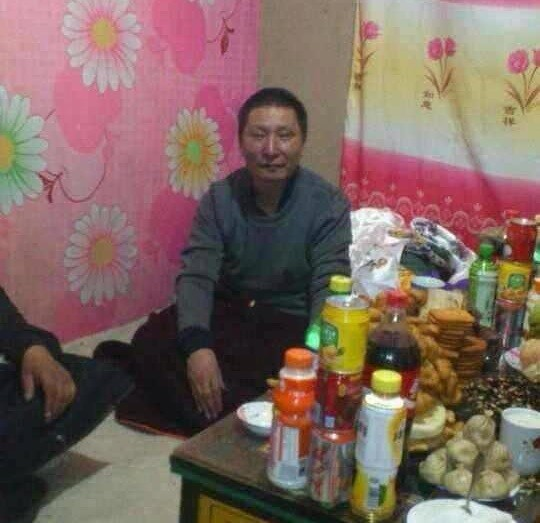
- Jigme Gyatso, after his release from prison, on 1 April 2013 in his hometown
- Born: 1961 (age 64–65); Kersul, Amdo, Gansu province, Tibet
- Occupation: President of the "Tibetan Independence Organisation" བོད་རང་བཙན་བདེན་དོན་རྩོད་ལེན་ཚོགས་ཆུང་།
- Known for: Political activities in Tibet

Jigme Gyatso (born 1961) is a Tibetan activist of the Tibetan Independence Organisation who, in 1996, was sentenced to 15 years in prison on charges of "leading a counter-revolutionary organisation" and "inciting splittism". Two more years were added to his sentence in 2004 when he protested in jail. Several international human rights groups have protested or campaigned on his behalf, and Amnesty International has designated him a prisoner of conscience.

== Background and early activism ==
Jigme Gyatso is from Kersul in Amdo, in Gansu province, Tibet. In 1985, he travelled to India to receive religious initiation, then returned to Tibet to join a monastery the following year. He then became involved in the Tibetan independence movement, acting as the leader of the secret youth organization "Tibetan Independence Organisation" in 1991. In 1992, he helped to organize a pro-independence rally in Lhasa, at which many participants were arrested by the Chinese public security bureau (PSB). Following the rally, PSB officials put Jigme Gyatso under surveillance.

== Arrest and imprisonment ==
On 30 March 1996 around 6pm, Jigme Gyatso was arrested at a restaurant in Lhasa owned by a fellow member of the Tibetan Independence Organization who was also arrested with him. Jigme Gyatso was then detained on charges related to the 1992 Lhasa protest: incitement and endangering national security by establishing an illegal organization. At his trial, authorities described him as a "counter-revolutionary ringleader". On 25 November 1996, the Lhasa Municipal Intermediate People's Court sentenced him to 15 years' imprisonment and 5 years' deprivation of his political rights.

Jigme Gyatso was then held for one year and one month in Gutsa PSB Detention Centre. He later stated that he was tortured during this time by prison authorities. During the first six months, he allegedly faced lengthy interrogation sessions, was forced to wear manacles on his wrists and ankles, and was beaten with batons. Amnesty International reported that in 1997, he was "beaten so badly that he could barely walk afterwards". "I heard that they took him out of the prison to a different place to torture and interrogate him very severely. The secret service policemen got drunk and put the beer bottles between the handcuffs and his back to hurt him even more." said his best friend who lives in exile.

He was transferred to Drapchi Prison in April 1997. In May of the following year, he joined other inmates in protesting inside prison when Chinese prison officials tried to force Tibetan political prisoners to salute the Chinese national flag and sing the Chinese national hymn. Nine inmates were killed by prison authorities in retaliation, and Jigme Gyatso was again beaten.

In May 2004, Jigme Gyatso again shouted "Long live the Dalai Lama!", resulting in a beating with electric batons. He was charged with "inciting separatism" and given an additional two years to his sentence, pushing his scheduled release back to March 2013. He was later transferred again, this time to Chushul Prison on the outskirts of Lhasa.

In January 2011, Amnesty International reported that Jigme Gyatso was believed to be seriously ill as a result of prison mistreatment, and issued an alert on his behalf. The World Organization Against Torture reported that he had become "very frail", suffered from kidney dysfunction, and could "only walk with his back bent".

=== International reaction ===
The United Nations Working Group on Arbitrary Detention reviewed Jigme Gyatso's case in 1999, and issued a ruling that his detention was "arbitrary" and unlawful. Amnesty International has campaigned repeatedly for Jigme Gyatso's release, and designated him a "prisoner of conscience", "detained solely for peacefully exercising his rights to freedom of expression, association and assembly". The Tibetan Centre for Human Rights and Democracy has issued warnings over his health and called for his release on compassionate grounds. In 2009, the World Organization Against Torture called for a letter-writing campaign on Jigme Gyatso's behalf in light of the evidence that he had been mistreated by prison authorities. The International Campaign for Tibet has also circulated petitions calling for "the release of Jigme Gyatso, so that he may seek medical attention and be freed from unjust political persecution".

On 27 November 2005, UN Special Rapporteur on Torture Manfred Nowak visited Jigme Gyatso in prison; in his official report, Nowak recommended that the prisoner be released. Jigme Gyatso was reportedly subject to beatings and solitary confinement as a result of the meeting.

=== Release ===
Jigme Gyatso was released from Chusul prison on 30 March 2013. He was ordered to return to his Sangchu home and arrived under police escort on 1 April 2013. His friend Jamyang Tsultrim related that "Those who saw him reported that he was very weak. He was limping and reported having heart problems and high blood pressure. His vision was also weak." Further he said that "People might think he is free now. But I want to make clear that Jigme Gyatso still suffers under surveillance of Chinese officials. He still has no rights and freedom."
