= List of United Nations resolutions concerning Tibet =

Concerning the question of Tibet, the United Nations General Assembly passed three resolutions in 1959, 1961, and 1965. In all three resolutions, the United Nations called for the respect of the Tibetan people's human rights, freedoms and cultural heritage, citing the principles set out in the Charter of the United Nations and the Universal Declaration of Human Rights. In Resolution 1723, the United Nations called specifically for the respect of the Tibetan people's right to self-determination.

== United Nations General Assembly Resolution 1353 (1959) ==
Passed on 21 October 1959 during the 834th plenary meeting, Resolution 1353 expressed grave concerns about the violation of the Tibetan people's fundamental human rights and freedoms, and cited official statement made by the 14th Dalai Lama.

== United Nations General Assembly Resolution 1723 (1961) ==
Passed on 20 December 1961 during the 1085th plenary meeting, Resolution 1723 solemnly called for the cessation of violating the Tibetan people's rights including right to self-determination.

== United Nations General Assembly Resolution 2079 (1965) ==
Passed on 18 December 1965 during the 1403rd plenary meeting, Resolution 2079 declared the United Nations' conviction that the violation of the Tibetan people's freedoms and the suppression of their cultural and religious life increase international tensions and embitter relations among peoples.
