= Labour camps in Tibet =

Labour transfer programme
- vocational training, re-education camps
- Other names: Labour transfer scheme, Vocational Education and Training Centers
- Location: Tibet Autonomous Region, China
- Built by: Chinese Communist Party
- Operational: Since 2019

The labour transfer programme or scheme in the Tibet Autonomous Region of the People's Republic of China, is part of the vocational training programmes run by the Chinese government under the Chinese Communist Party (CCP) aimed at teaching skills, providing jobs, improving standards of living and lifting Tibetans out of poverty. The Tibetan regional government came out with a policy paper in March 2019 called the "2019–2020 Farmer and Pastoralist Training and Labor Transfer Action Plan" which mandates the "military-style…[vocational] training".

Many aspects of the scheme have been called coercive, with religious re-education and correction of "backward thinking" including "thought education" also being planned for Tibetans excessively influenced by religion. The training includes learning the Chinese language and developing "gratitude" for the CCP. Plans for "poverty alleviation" say that the state must "stop raising up lazy people". This characterization has been questioned by other scholars who point out that vocational programs and a career in the military have long served as means of upward mobility for non-elite Tibetans.

== 2020 Zenz report ==
According to a September 2020 report by German anthropologist Adrian Zenz sponsored by the Jamestown Foundation, over 500,000 Tibetans, mostly subsistence farmers and herders, were trained in the first seven months of 2020 in military-style training centres experts say are akin to labour camps. The study adds the training programs lead to most workers ending up in low-paid jobs like textile manufacturing, construction, and agriculture. However, the Jamestown Foundation study stresses that in Tibet, the labour scheme is "potentially less coercive" than what is alleged in Xinjiang re-education camps. The study concluded:

While some Tibetans may voluntarily participate in some or all aspects of the scheme, and while their incomes may indeed increase as a result, the systemic presence of clear indicators of coercion and indoctrination, coupled with profound and potentially permanent change in modes of livelihood, is highly problematic. In the context of Beijing’s increasingly assimilatory ethnic minority policy, it is likely that these policies will promote a long-term loss of linguistic, cultural and spiritual heritage.

=== Criticism ===
Other scholars have criticized some of Zenz's conclusions and pointed out that vocational programs in Tibet are actually undersupplied compared to other regions of China and welcomed by poorer, less-educated Tibetans as a means of upward mobility, often in combination with expanded state-mandated hiring quotas for minorities and a career in the military.

== Chinese government reactions ==
Officials in Chinese administered Tibet have defended the "vocational training program", saying that it allows the locals to acquire new work skills and improve living standards. Tibetans are not forced to take part in the program, and if they do, they have the choice of taking up the training they want, such as driving or welding.

== See also ==
- Laogai
- List of concentration and internment camps#China
- List of prisons in the Tibet Autonomous Region
- List of re-education through labor camps in China
- Penal system in China
- Re-education through labor
