= Hidden Tibet =

Hidden Tibet: History of Independence and Occupation is a book written by Sergius L. Kuzmin, a specialist of amphibians and history of Mongolia and Tibet, Dr.Sc.(Hist.) and Ph.D.(Biol.) of the Russian Academy of Sciences, Dr.Sc.(H.C.) of the Institute of History and Archeology of Mongolian Academy of Sciences and published in 2010 by A. Terentyev publishing house, with the support of the International Campaign for Tibet.

The book is devoted to the political history of Tibet. Its central thesis is that historical facts demonstrate that throughout its history, Tibet has never been an integral part of China.

Presentation of the book was held on March 10, 2010, at the Institute for the regional press. At the presentation of the English edition of the book, which was held on April 10, 2012, in Dharamshala, Tibetan Prime Minister Lobsang Sangay delivered a speech.

On October 14, 2016, Sergey Kuzmin was awarded a degree of honorary doctor of the Institute of History and Archeology of the Academy of Sciences of Mongolia for his significant contribution to the study of the history of Mongolia and the development of Mongolian studies. In 2017 he received the degree of doctor of historical sciences at the Institute of Oriental Studies, Russian Academy of Sciences.
