= Penal system in China =

The penal system in the People's Republic of China is composed of an administrative detention system and a judicial incarceration system. As of 2020, it is estimated that 1.7 million people had been incarcerated in the People's Republic of China, which is the second-highest prison population after the United States. China also retains the use of the death penalty with the approval of the Supreme People's Court, and there is a system of death penalty with reprieve in which the sentence is suspended unless the convict commits another major crime within two years while they are detained.

== History ==
Penal labor was formalized in the 1950s, soon after the Chinese Communist Party (CCP) won the Chinese Civil War. According to historian John Delury, "Communist penal theory fused traditional Confucian and Buddhist notions of transformation with Soviet techniques."

The Prison Law of the People's Republic of China was enacted on December 20, 1994. Since then, the Chinese prison system has operated under supervision of the Bureau of Prison Administration which falls under the Ministry of Justice.

== Prison enterprises ==
All prisons in China operate businesses which they use to fund their operations. Prison officers can earn bonuses for financial and business performance.

== Population ==
The prisons which were managed by the Ministry of Justice held 1,649,804 prisoners in mid-2015, resulting in a population rate of 118 per 100,000. Adding the number of detainees in the Ministry of Public Security's detention centers of 650,000 reported as of 2009, would result a total population of 2,300,000, and raise the rate to 164 per 100,000. In the same report, it is noted that female prisoners account for about 6.5%, juvenile for 0.8% and foreigners for 0.4% of the total prisoners population in Ministry of Justice's facilities.

== Investigative detentions ==
Public security departments, People's Procuratorates, People's Courts and Supervisory Commissions can issue detention orders, and the detainees are usually held in facilities managed by public security departments, though supervisory commissions usually take care of their own detainees. State security department have similar rights and functions as public security departments.

Delegates of the congress or local people's congress above county-level during their term are exempt from detention or criminal prosecution without prior approval from the standing committee of the corresponding legislature. Chinese police and security services routinely make use of torture to obtain confessions and information from detainees.

=== Administrative ===
Public Security officers can summon civilians for investigative purposes, and can use force when a civilian refuses to cooperate and when approved by a superior officer. Public Security Administration Punishment Law states police should not question citizen on grounds authorized exceed eight hours, unless the citizen has violation that could result in administrative detention, in which case, the questioning could be extended to 24 hours. Criminal Procedure Law states the police should not question someone for more than twelve hours, unless that someone is a major suspect of a crime, in which case it could be extended to twenty four hours.

If the police found enough evidence for a crime, they can submit it to a procurator and ask permission for arrest, or if there is limited evidence or considered misdemeanor, they can impose administrative detention for up to fourteen days.

State Security officers have similar rights and authorities as Public Security officers.

=== Procuratorial ===
The procuratorates can approve arrest when there is a reasonable ground with requests from the police or sometimes on their own for public-servants-related crimes they investigate (which function has since been absorbed by Supervisory Commissions), after which the suspect is placed into Criminal (investigative) detention, which can last for two months, and with approval from superior office, can be extended to seven months.

=== Judicial ===
The people's courts can summon citizens and with approval from its Chief Judge, detain those who disrupt judicial process or refuse to cooperate. Judicial detention be as long as fourteen days, usually under facilities of public security departments. It is authorized on different grounds in Criminal Procedure Law, Civil Procedure Law and Administrative Procedure Law.

=== Supervisory ===
The supervisory commissions (established in March 2018) can detain civil servants and politicians who are suspected of corruption when they have reasonable amount of evidence. Detentions must be approved by a superior commission or the national commission.Political detention, or Liuzhi, can be applied for up to three month, which can be extended once for up to three month when approved from a superior commission. Civil servants detained are not always allowed to see anyone, including their lawyer. This is authorized under Supervision Law.

== Penalties ==
=== Administrative ===
The public security and state security departments are the two departments under the administrative branch that can limit one's freedom. For violation of the Public Security Administration Penalty Law, the police can impose penalties on their own, though those detained can file administrative review to its supervising department or file an administrative lawsuit to a court.

In American and British English, this law's title would translate to the Police Penalties Act; it is an Act of the National People's Congress that prescribes penalties such as fines and detention to be administered by police.

The act's 2025 revision sets out the statute's overall purpose and scope. Its general provisions state that the law is intended to maintain public order, protect public safety and legal rights, and set standards for how law enforcement agencies and the police exercise their powers. It distinguishes between conduct that constitutes a crime, which is handled under China's Criminal Law act, and conduct that does not meet criminal thresholds, which is handled through police penalties under this law.

Administrative detention for misdemeanors outlined in Administrative Penalty Law for up to twenty days. Teenagers of sixteen years old or less and women who are pregnant or feeding an infant less than one years old are exempt. Teenagers aged sixteen to eighteen are exempt from their first misdemeanor.

Compulsory rehabilitation may be imposed on drug addicts who refuse or failed community rehabilitation or who began to reuse after previous community rehabilitation for a duration of two years ordinarily. Public security department issue the order for compulsory rehabilitation. Rehabilitation centers are often run by the public security department and, in some places, the judicial administrative department. There are concerns that this may give the public security organ too much power with little or no oversight. The effectiveness of compulsory rehabilitation is also questioned, and it is more often seen as a deterrence rather than rehabilitation.

=== Judicial ===
For those who are prosecuted and found guilty, the court may sentence them to following penalties that limit one's freedom in accordance with the law:

Public surveillance or Guanzhi (literally, Control) requires no jail time, and the convicted can return to his community immediately but must report their activities to the local police department or judicial administrative department regularly for the duration designated by the court from a minimum three months to a maximum two years, and with multiple crimes combined sentencing can reach three years. Guanzhi also require one's freedom of speech, association, publishing, protest etc. be limited unless approved by the designated reporting agency, though one can still vote and hold public offices. For those under Guanzhi, right to equal pay at work is protected by law.

Criminal detention or Juyi range from one month to six months in a place near one's residence, overseen by the local police department and the convicted is allowed return home one or two days per month. They may need to work while detained and will receive some pay.

Fixed-term imprisonment will range from six months to fifteen years, or when guilty of multiple crimes, the maximum will be twenty years or the combined sentenced time, whichever is less. If reduced from death penalty, the term will be twenty five years. If reduced from life imprisonment, the term will be twenty years.

Life imprisonment can almost always be reduced to fixed-term, though total time served must be no less than ten years. Life without parole was enacted into the Criminal Law on Dec 11, 2015, is applicable to those convicted with embezzlement.

Death penalty with two years reprieve will be commuted to life imprisonment if the convicted did not commit another serious crime within the two-year period or fixed-term imprisonment if the convicted helped solve a major crime or contributed the society greatly. Death penalty with reprieve, without parole can be automatically reduced to life without parole if another crime is not committed within the two-year period, from which point the sentence can no longer be commuted.

Death penalty with immediate execution must be approved by the Supreme People's Court. The death penalty is not applicable to pregnant women, minors, and in most cases, seniors more than 70 years old. If a woman is found pregnant anytime while detained or incarcerated before execution, even if she miscarried, the execution will be cancelled and the sentence reverted, and the court must redetermine an appropriate sentence.

If sentenced to imprisonment of any kind, pre-trial time detained will be deducted from the actual time needed to serve, and for those sentenced to public surveillance, one day detained will be count as two days served.

== Administration ==
Prisons are managed by prison administration of local departments of justice, and detention centers are managed by police departments. For those sentenced to administrative or criminal detention, the holding cells are administrated by local police department. For those sentenced to fixed term or life imprisonment or death penalty, they are admitted into prisons managed by local prison administration overseen by Prison Administration Beaureu of Ministry of Justice.

=== Detention centers ===
Detention centers are managed by local public security department, overseen by Ministry of Public Security (MPS), the condition of those detention centers varies as there are no clear law on its operation but only internal regulations made by MPS and provincial department of public security.

Administrative Detention Center or Juliu Suo, literally "detain and stay facility", is used for administrative or judicial detention. It is usually located within a public security station and guarded by the police. The detained are usually released within twenty days.

General Detention Center or Kanshou Suo, literally "watch and guard facility", is used for suspect of an ongoing criminal investigation as authorized by procurators or criminal detention as sentenced by court. Fixed-term imprisonment with less than three months of actual sentence at the time of the verdict is also served here. The perimeter of these facilities are watched by the People's Armed Police (PAP), but administrated by the public security department.

Those who are punished or sentenced for a short time are not required to do labour, but those who are sentenced for a long time may need to. Good performance when working in the penal labor system can get time taken off a prisoner or detainee's sentence but conversely underperforming and failing to meet a production quota can get time added onto a sentence.

Sometimes these detention centers are located in the same place or closely together, with certain degree of separation.

=== Prisons ===
Prisons are usually large in size and they are supervised by the Bureau of Prisons Administration which is under the control of the Ministry of Justice in accordance with the Prison Law. The only exception to this rule is Qincheng Prison, which is managed by the Ministry of Public Security and is reported to have held high-profile convicts. Prisons have few deputies because they are headed by wardens who are assisted by teams of police. The administrators of the prisons are members of the People's Police. A Procurator's Office supervises the prisons that fall under its jurisdiction, and it is required to ensure the protection of the rights of the prisoners and lawfully operate the prisons. The Prisons reportedly have better living conditions than the detention centers which are operated by the public security station, depending on where they are located. Male adult prisoners, female prisoners and juvenile offenders are each held in separate facilities. Almost all prisons in China operate within the penal labor system, some prisons have full-time sales staffs which are required to solicit orders from manufacturers and sub-contractors which are located in different parts of China. Prisoners may also be contracted out to companies as a source of cheap and obedient labor. The Chinese government does not provide sufficient funds to prisons and detention facilities and as a result, their staffs are forced to generate their own revenues. If the staffs of prisons and detention centers do not generate their own revenues, they will not be able to operate their prisons and detention centers. Prisoners in Chinese prisons are systematically abused by guards and prison authorities, torture is routinely used in Chinese jails, it is used for investigative and punitive purposes.

Adult

Prisoners may be subjected to forced labor, often under harsh and violent conditions. It was reported that most prisons operate on a point-based system, which means that prisoners who passed their line will receive extra compensation depending on how many extra points they have earned. The judge who presides over a prisoner's commutation trial will consider the prisoner's labor record evidence of his or her good behavior. The prison shall have a classroom and a reading room, and the prisoners shall receive an education. Chinese law states that prisoners shall receive prompt medical treatment and it also states that prisons shall be equipped with infirmaries.

According to Chinese law, female prisoners are supposed to be held in separate facilities and in those facilities, they will be watched by female officers, male officers are generally not allowed to enter these facilities and when they need to meet a prisoner for official purposes, they must be accompanied by a female officer. However, it has been widely reported that the sexual abuse of prisoners by authorities is widespread in the Chinese penal system. The International Society for Human Rights claims that female political prisoners are frequently gang raped on the order of prison authorities.

Juvenile

Chinese law stipulates that those who are below the age of eighteen when they are sentenced will be sent to juvenile facilities, and those who reach the age of eighteen while they are detained will not be transferred if the remainder of their sentence is less than two years.

=== Community correction ===
Since the passage of the Community Correction Bill in 2016, discussions about it have been heated. The Community Correction Bill is part of the Eighth Amendment which was added to the Criminal Law in 2011, however, community correction has been implemented in different ways since 2003 because the Eighth Amendment to the Criminal Law does not contain clear instructions as to how Community Correction should be implemented. As a result, those who should be in community correction programs largely remain free, besides their monthly duty to report to police stations. And because of that, community correction is rarely granted to prisoners who apply for it for non-medical reasons. The legislation on community correction is expected to increase the use of such measures, reduce the size of the prison population and combat recidivism by better acclimatizing prisoners to the society.

== Commutation ==
Commutation is offered to prisoners with good behavior, and should the administration of the prisons apply for commutation or parole, the intermediate court of the jurisdiction which the prison falls in, will open trial in order to decide on commutations and paroles based on material which is provided by the prison's staff and testimonies which are given by the prisoners, the guards and the cellmates. The procuratorate of the same jurisdiction will send a representative to these trials. For those who are sentenced to life or death with a reprieve, the commutation or parole of their sentences will be heard at the high court of corresponding jurisdiction.

== Pardons ==
The Constitution of China grants the Standing Committee of the National People's Congress the power to grant pardons and release prisoners, then issued by the President. On August 28, 2015, Xi Jinping signed the pardon order which resulted in the release of over thirty thousand prisoners, most of whom had participated in the Second Sino-Japanese War or the Chinese Communist Revolution. This is the eighth time of such pardon, and first time after Chairman Mao and President Liu's order of this scale.

== See also ==
- Capital punishment in China
- Crime in China
- Human rights in China
- Judicial system of China
- Law enforcement in China
- Laws in China
- Labour camps in Tibet
- Laogai
- Re-education through labor
- Xinjiang re-education camps
- List of concentration and internment camps#China
- List of prisons in the Tibet Autonomous Region
- List of re-education through labor camps in China
- One institution with two names
- Shuanggui
