= Drapchi Prison =

Prison in Lhasa, Tibet, China

Coordinates: 29.67917605°N 91.13947266°E

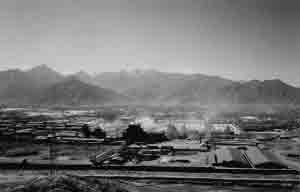
An undated image of the Chinese created Drapchi Prison

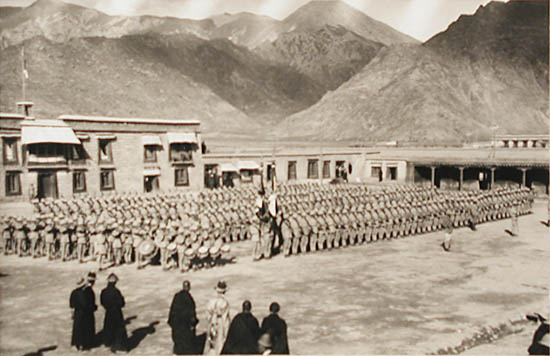
Photo of the Drapchi Regiment of the Tibetan Army taken in the 1930s before 1935 by Frederick Williamson

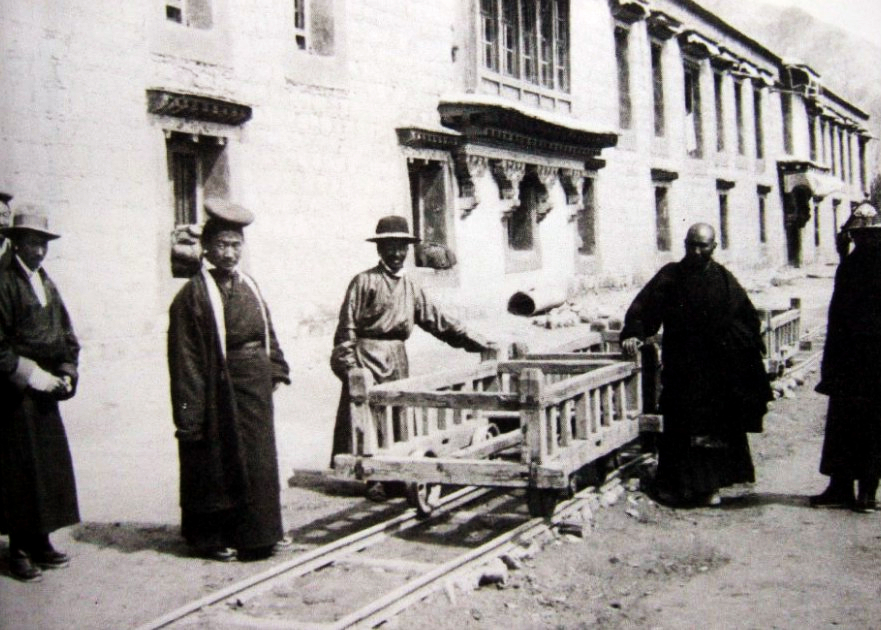
The Tibetan coin (mint) Drapchi Lekhung (north side of the main building), photographed by Frederick Williamson on August 31, 1933

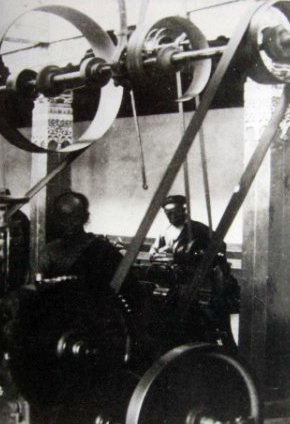
Photo of Tibetan Government Mint called Drapchi Lekhung milling machines into new coins public use called Drapchi Lekhung on 1 August 1933 by Frederick Williamson

Drapchi Prison, or Lhasa Prison No. 1 (Tibetan: གྲྭ་བཞི་, Wylie: grwa bzhi, lit. "four corners"; simplified Chinese: 拉萨第一监狱; traditional Chinese: 拉薩第一監獄), is the largest prison in Tibet, China, located in Lhasa. Drapchi is the Tibetan word, named after its location and was originally a military garrison until it was converted into a prison after the 1959 Tibetan Uprising. It is roughly one mile from the city centre and is the main prison for judicially sentenced prisoners in Tibet. It was the primary place for the detention of political prisoners before 2005 when the newer and modernised Chushur (Chinese: Qushui) Prison was built. Drapchi also goes by the name Delapuxie prison, which has sometimes been listed as a separate prison online.

According to Central Tibetan Administration, the prison has gained a notorious reputation and is feared by the Tibetans due to its strong management. Reports of brutality have been alleged by Tibetan exile groups.

In November 1994, 13 nuns were sent to Drapchi to serve a 5-year sentence for endangering state security by protests against the Chinese rule in Lhasa. In April 1996, all the inmates of Unit 3 of Drapchi prison, consisting of nearly 100 female political prisoners, went on a hunger strike in protest of their treatment. The week-long strike caused the prison officers some concern that it might damage the reputation of the prison further if the inmates died as a result and promised an end to the brutality.

Drapchi Prison used to be the only official prison in Tibet but, following the 1994 law change, former laogais were rebranded, and locations such as Powo Tramo were also referred to as prisons.

China claims that "The Tibet Autonomous Region Prison aims to create a "modern and civilised prison". According to the same source, between 1997 and 2004, it had invested "more than 60 million yuan in the construction of software and hardware facilities, which has improved the overall appearance of the prison".

== See also ==
- List of prisons in the Tibet Autonomous Region
- Lhasa
- Tibetan Money
- Army of Tibet
- Tsarong
- Human Rights in Tibet
- Tibet since 1950
- Central Tibetan Administration
- Ganden Phodrang
- Tenzin Gyatso, the 14th Dalai Lama
