= Sangyip Prison Complex =

Prison in Lhasa, Tibet, China

Sangyip Prison Complex, officially called the People's Armed Police (PAP) Number 1 Branch (Chinese: Di yi zhidui - Unit No. 1), is located in Lhasa, Tibet. It is well known for the political detention of Tibetans throughout its history, which is believed to have started in 1964. Articles often refer to prisoners detained in Sangyip Prison; however, Sangyip includes several prisons (units) all under the same banner. References to Sangyip as a prison complex date back as far as 1994. Reports from human rights organizations, such as Amnesty International and Human Rights Watch, have documented severe human rights abuses within Sangyip Prison, including torture, forced labor, and inadequate living conditions. Notable detainees have included Takna Jigme Sangpo, Yeshi Gyatso, Palden Gyatso, among others.
