= List of prisons in the Tibet Autonomous Region =

This is a list of prisons within Tibet Autonomous Region province of the People's Republic of China. This list does not include detention centres, which are not classed as prisons in China.

Name	Enterprise name	City/County/District/Prefecture	Village/Town	Established	Notes	Coordinates
Sangyip Prison Complex		Lhasa		1964	Officially known as the People's Armed Police (PAP) Number 1 Branch (Chinese: Di yi zhidui - Unit No. 1), Sangyip is a military and prison complex located in Lhasa, Tibet. It is well known for the political detention of Tibetans throughout its history, which is believed to have started in 1964. Articles often refer to prisoners detained in Sangyip Prison; however, Sangyip includes several prisons (units) all under the same banner. References to Sangyip as a prison complex date back as far as 1994.	
Powo Tramo Prison (Ch: Bomi Prison)	Nyingtri Prefecture (Ch: Nyingchi)	Kongpo, Pomé County	Qingduo	1955	Located 400 miles east of Lhasa, this prison is a significant centre for the detention of political prisoners. In November 2001, all Tibetan political prisoners with heavy sentences were transferred there. It is believed to be spread across two units forming a complex with either referred to as Powo Tramo. Powo Tramo is also known as Zhamu Prison, Bomi Prison, Bomi Second Prison, Prison Number 2, or Tibet Autonomous Regional No. 2 Labour Reform Detachment. Initially, the Tibet Autonomous Region Public Security Department's second labour reform team, Powo Tramo, was established in the 1980s under the Tibet Autonomous Region Public Security Department's management. After policy changes in 1992, the RTL team was transferred to the Tibet Autonomous Region Judicial Department. The RTL team was then changed to Bomi Prison (official Chinese name) in the Tibet Autonomous Region in 1994	Area No. 1: 30.06715968,95.56494266 Area No.2: 30.01150132,95.60979896
Chushur Prison	Nitang Brickyard	Qüxü County, Lhasa			A large prison, hundreds of political prisoners, United Nations Special Rapporteur on torture, M. Nowak, visited the prison in 2005.	29.55185984,90.96841697
Lhasa Prison (Utritru/Utritu)		Lhasa		1988	Utritru has also been known as Lhasa Prison since 1995, Its name comes from the Chinese "Wuzhidui". It was first built in 1988 as an RTL facility, became a laojiao, and is now a prison. It is part of a group of prisons known as Sangyip. Information suggests Utritru is mainly a criminal detention facility, rather than political. but it has been used to provide extra cells for other prisons nearby. Most of its historical political inmate population was moved to Trisam in mid-1992. The prison has undergone significant expansion starting in the 90s and then several times between 2005 and 2020.	29.6850411, 91.15916768
Lhasa Juvenile Offender Detachment					Believed to be attached to Utritru within the perimeter but separated by walls.	29.68497744, 91.15555793
Lhasa Prison for Special Prisoners						
Xizang Autonomous Region Prison	Carpet Factory	Lhasa	Zaji	1960	Also referred to as Drapchi, Delapuxie, or Tibet Autonomous Region Prison. It was the primary place for the detention of political prisoners before 2005 when the newer and modernised Chushur (Chinese: Qushui) Prison was built. Drapchi is the Tibetan name, named after its location. It was originally a military garrison until it was converted into a prison after the 1959 Tibetan Uprising. It is roughly one mile from the city centre and is the main prison for judicially sentenced prisoners in Tibet. In 2004, Working Group on Arbitrary Detention visited the prison. About 7% are female, 76% Tibetans and 20% Han Chinese.	29.67917605,91.13947266
Trisam Prison				1992	Has three units: the first for male political prisoners, the second for male criminals and the third for women prisoners. Juveniles are included. Trisam conducted hard labor, and at least eight cells were reportedly used for solitary confinement. It is currently believed to be in use as a drug rehabilitation centre.	29.63864478,90.98179196
Xizang No. 2 Prison					May be the same location as Powo Tramo. Holds political prisoners.	
