= Astragalomancy =

Form of divination

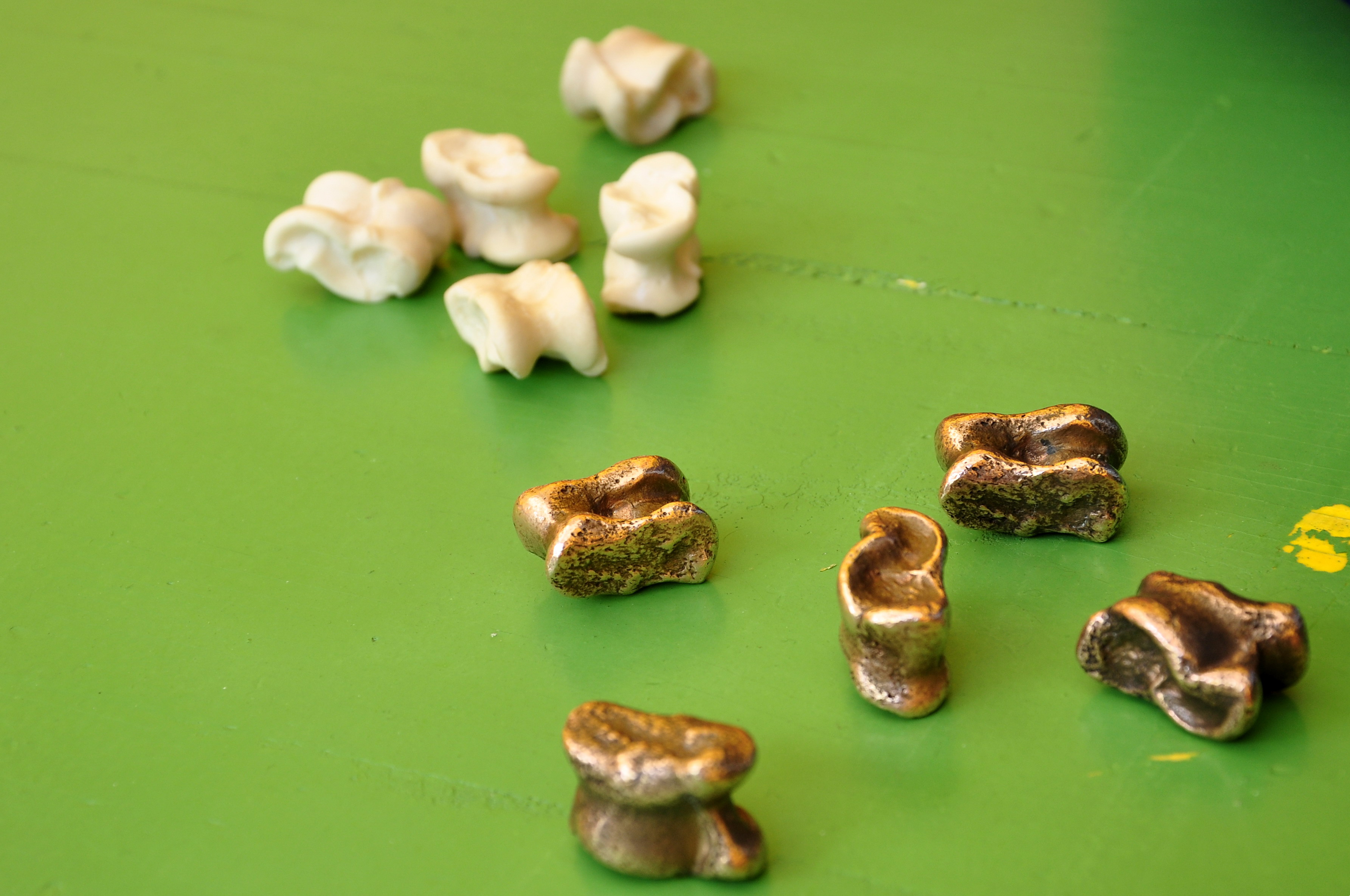
Replica Roman astragali

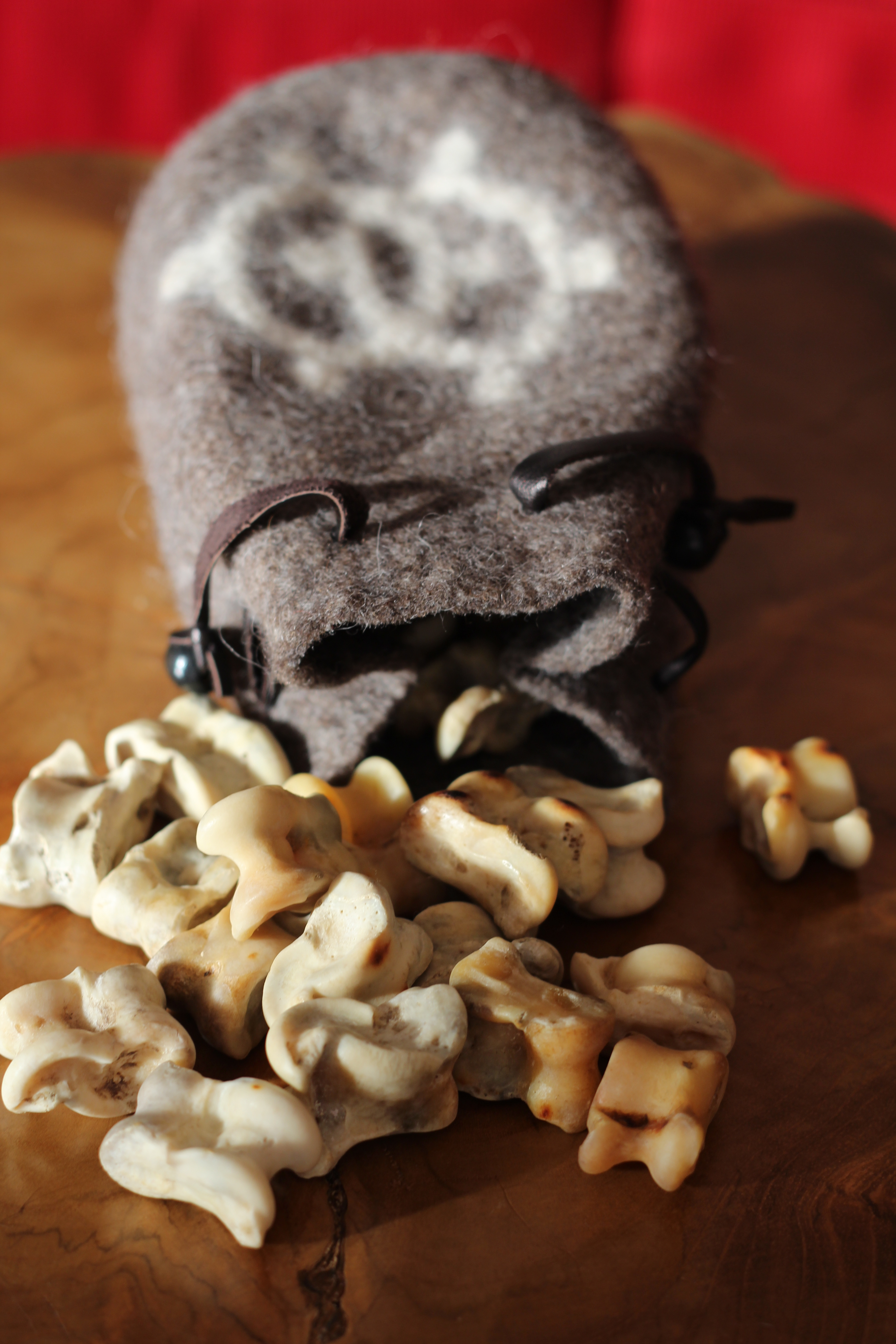
Astragali used for gaming in Mongolia

Astragalomancy, also known as cubomancy or astragyromancy, is a form of divination that uses dice specially marked with letters or numbers. Historically, as with dice games, the "dice" were usually knucklebones or other small bones of quadrupeds. Marked astragali (talus bones) of sheep and goats are commonly found in Mediterranean and Near Eastern archaeological sites, particularly those that served as funerary and religious locations. For example, marked astragali have been found near the altar of Aphrodite Ourania in Athens, Greece, suggesting that astragalomancy was performed near the altar after about 500 BCE.

The practice of contacting divine truth via random castings of dice or bones stretches back before recorded history. The Metropolitan Museum of Art displayed bone "dice" (hakata) used by the Shona people of Southern Africa.

Astragalomancy is often considered to be a branch of cleromancy. As a form of sortition, numbers are scrawled into the dice; the numbers are associated with letters, thus bearing on the questions of the diviner. The diviner then casts the dice, resulting in a random sequence of numbers. The diviner interprets this sequence according to certain rules, usually related to a religion (e.g. Tibetan Buddhism and the Mo system of cubomancy).

Another branch of cleromancy sometimes compared to astragalomancy is pessomancy (also known as psephomancy) – a type of divination which uses colored or marked pebbles rather than numbered dice. These pebbles are either thrown out of a bag after shuffling or drawn from the bag at random. The interpretation of the colors or symbols relate to issues such as health, communications, success, and travel.

== In Ancient Greece ==
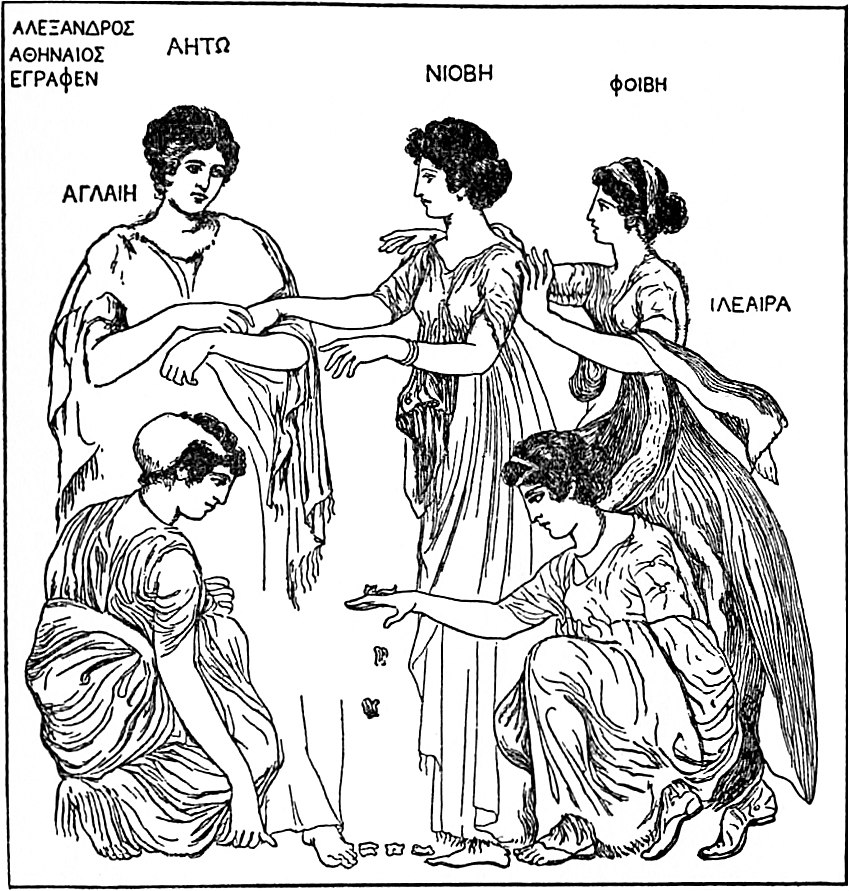
EB1911 Greek Art - Greek Drawing of Women Playing at Knucklebones

Astragalomancy animation: computer simulation of 1 million throws with 10% chance for 1 and 6 and 40% chance for 3 and 4. The complete set of 56 is reached between the 20,000th and 200,000th throw.

Astragalomancy was performed in Ancient Greece through the rolling of astragaloi and subsequent consultation of "dice oracles". Astragaloi] are the marked and cut-off knucklebones of sheep, or similarly shaped imitations in bronze or wood that served as divination dice in the ancient Greek world. They have four sides and are oblong in shape, with two rounded sides on which they do not land. The dice had two narrow sides and two broad sides, with one of the narrow sides being flat, the other concave, while one broad side was concave and the other convex. The sides were associated with the values 1,3,4 and 6, with opposing sides adding up to seven. Unlike cubic dice, the construction of astragaloi meant there were varying chances that a particular value would be rolled. The results were then compared to dice oracles, some of which have since been excavated throughout the Mediterranean on large stone pillars Each result also had an attached divinity to it, for example the roll of five ones, statistically the lowest roll due to the construction of the dice, was a favourable roll and was associated with Zeus, with one oracle reading “because Zeus will give good counsel to your mind;”.

These Anatolian dice oracles are all set out in a particular format. They address the reader in a first-person singular, with an implied narrator and an implied reader. The narrator addresses the reader as if they are interacting, and regularly addresses the reader as ‘stranger’ implying they come from somewhere else, usually with business to be conducted. The business the reader has is either silently or openly expressed to the oracle, who responds in kind. The text's standard construction of the inquirer then is one who has come from a foreign place to the oracle, puts the business or activities he wants to conduct to the god, and then receives an answer. These answers included positive responses like, “You will find that for which you are consulting the oracle, and nothing will be bad” or “you will get everything about which you are asking,” and negative ones such as, “The sun has gone down, and terrible night has come. Everything has become dark: interrupt the matter, about which you ask me.”

== Tibetan dice divination ==
Tibetan culture contains a wide range of dice divination traditions, some within the Buddhist tradition and some outside of it. The most common form uses the standard cubical six-sided dice with sides numbered on through six with pips. Others such as the Sanskrit pāśaka are four sided rectangular dice, and date from the eighth to the tenth century with evidence from manuscripts.

There is evidence that dice divination was used in Tibetan law, influencing things such as loans, interest, marital law and troop conscription. There is a recently published Tibetan manuscript containing both a divination manual and a legal text, suggesting an interconnectedness between the two practices. The legal section of the text lays out many issues spread over 11 ‘clauses’, which contain sets of questions and answers. Each case ends with a question of whether the matter can be resolved by means of sho, meaning ‘dice’. The petitions typically end with the phrase “Do we decide by means of sho or not - how do you command?".

=== Early Tibetan dice divination ===
Early Tibetan dice divination was performed with pāśaka, four-sided oblong dice with pips one through four marked on the long sides. These were generally 7 cm x 1 cm x 1 cm in size and were constructed so that under regular circumstances it was unlikely they landed on their narrow ends. In order to produce an oracle, the process was as follows: one pāśaka, or die, was thrown three consecutive times, with the result and order of the pips recorded. With these three throws, sixty four possible combinations, or omens, were possible. These omens were usually displayed in manuscripts with geometric shapes separated by lines, like this “◎◎ / ◎ / ◎◎◎◎” representing the dice results. This result would then be compared to the corresponding entry in the manuscript, and the omen would then apply. The omens themselves are constructed in a particular way, and are either written in verse (referred to as Type-1) or written in prose (referred to as type 2). The contents can be summarised as follows:

- “(a) set of die-marks,
- (b) verse in ⟨Type-1⟩ / the name of the divinity in ⟨Type-2⟩,
- (c) commentary,
- (d) result.”

== In Tibetan Buddhism ==
The Dalai Lama is reported as using the mo, balls of dough in which have been placed pieces of paper with possible "choices" written on them, to help in making important decisions. Tibetan divination has long featured the mo in making everyday decisions, too. There are books written by various lamas on interpretations for the casting of dice. The traditional six sided dice appears in the iconography of the Hindu deity Lha-Mo. A pair of such dice hang from her belt, attached with string. Lha-Mo is part of the “eight terrible ones”, defenders of the buddhist faith, and is closely associated with divination, with a strong connection to divination via dice throwing. Lha-Mo's connection to dice throwing is apparent in a story in the Beun-mo bka'i than-yig, a religious text. In this story, Lha-Mo appears in the guise of a fortune teller multiple times, and ritually throws dice in each apparition, eventually healing a queen who was sick. The lamas of the Lha-Mo cult, the “Dpal-Idan dmag-zor rgyal-mo'i sgo-nas” still perform a dice throwing ritual for divination today, called ‘mo’.

== On the Silk Road ==
The style of astragalomancy using numerical trigrams was widespread, and evidence of such is found in Turkish, Tibetan, Sanskrit, and Sogdian divination texts from the sixth century through to the 10th century. One particular text is called the Divination of Maheśvara, found on the silk road frontier of Dunhuang. This text is unique as it is a dice divination text in which the method is entirely different from any other known Chinese divination text. The text contains sixty-four oracles, each of which is associated with a deity, as well as being keyed to a particular three-number combination or numerical trigram, placing this method at an intersection between Chinese numerical trigram divination traditions, and Indian dice divination traditions. The method involves the diviner invoking Śakra, Brahmā, the Four Heavenly Kings as well as other spirits; the client sits facing west and casts the dice after stating the concern to create a trigram, which the diviner interprets using a text.

== In South America ==
The huayru is a dice game played in South America at funerals. The game is traditionally played with llama bones, as they are believed to have a special power to attract the soul of the deceased. There are many reasons for the playing of this game, but all of which revolve around divining the will of the recently deceased. There is an example of how the huayru game was used in order to divine the fate of the community during an Ecuadorian agrarian reform, and interpreted the dice throw as the deceased being unhappy with the direction the community was heading. This shows that the game provided a link between the living and the deceased, with the game serving as a way to communicate and receive guidance. The game also represents the journey of the deceased, with the dice representing llamas that undertake a journey throughout places associated with commodities such as a silver mine, and it is this journey that introduces ambiguity into the game. The players of the game try to influence the results of the dice by offering prayers or pouring libations, indicating it is a game of chance. This is in contrast to the cultural context of the game, where the deceased is the one who controls how the dice fall, and the players react as such, beating on the corpse of the deceased and questioning why it wishes them to fail if the dice do not fall in their favour. The dice themselves in some cultures instead are carved out of manioc or plantain as opposed to llama bones, and are carved in the shape of a canoe. Both llamas and canoes hold significance as they are both symbols of travel, with both llamas and canoes being used to carry cargo long distances, and so the playing of the game assists the soul of the deceased on its journey. For some Amazonian societies, the symbol is more powerful as the corpse of the deceased is placed in a hollowed tree called a canoe.
