= Gyaca =

Gyaca may refer to:

- Gyaca County, county in Tibet
- Gyaca, Tibet, village in Tibet
