= Architecture of Tibet =

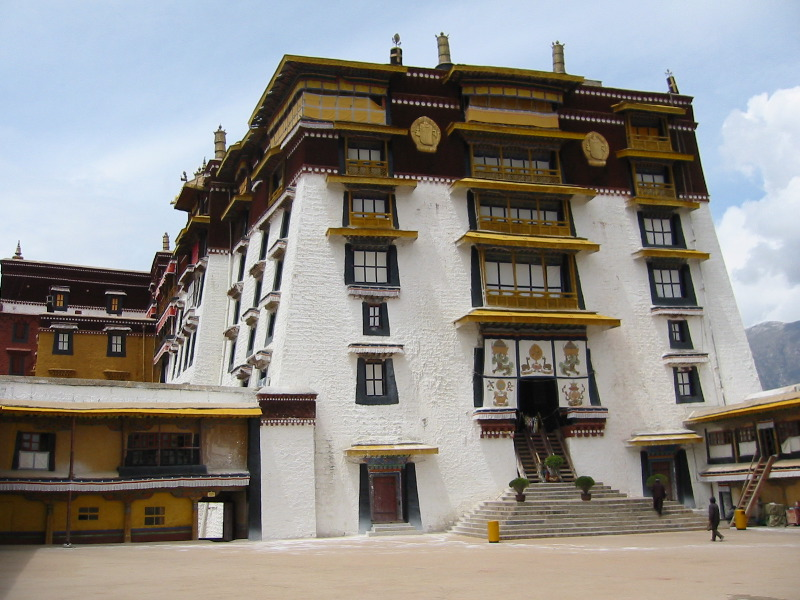
The White Palace of the Potala

Architecture of Tibet contains influences from neighboring regions but has many unique features brought about by its adaptation to the cold, generally arid, high-altitude climate of the Tibetan plateau. Buildings are generally made from locally available construction materials, and are often embellished with symbols of Tibetan Buddhism. For example, private homes often have Buddhist prayer flags flying from the rooftop.

Religious structures fall into two main types: temples, which are used for religious ceremonies and worship; and stupas (Chörtens), which are reliquaries and symbols. Temples (gompas) come in a great variety of styles, generally reflecting local architectural traditions. The design of the Tibetan Chörtens can vary, from roundish walls in Kham to squarish, four-sided walls in Ladakh.

Secular structures in Tibet include private homes, multi-family dwellings, and shops. Some herding families live in tents for part of the year, although people who live in tents year-round are becoming rare due to government programs to encourage (or require) herdsmen to move into permanent housing. Manor homes that belonged to the Tibetan aristocracy before 1949 have all but disappeared from the Tibetan plateau; however at least one, Namseling Manor in Dranang County, Lhoka Prefecture, which dates from the 14th century, has been restored.

Typically, Tibetan structures are constructed of natural materials such as stone, clay, and wood. Since 1980, concrete has also come into use but so far is not widespread. The most desirable building sites are on elevated land facing south. Flat roofs are used in most parts of the central and western Tibetan plateau where rainfall is slight; however in the eastern Tibetan plateau where summer rains are heavier, sloping roofs, covered either in slate, shingles, or (increasingly) ceramic tile, are popular in some regions. In prosperous agricultural areas, private homes may have up to three stories. In herding areas where houses may be used only part of the year, they usually have only one story.

Walls that are constructed of stone or rammed earth may be up to a meter thick at the base. In large structures such as temples and manor homes, walls slope inward to create an illusion of greater height. Windows are usually small because the walls are so heavy that large openings would make the structure weak and unstable. In the past, windows featured paper-covered wooden latticework, but nowadays almost universally use glass.

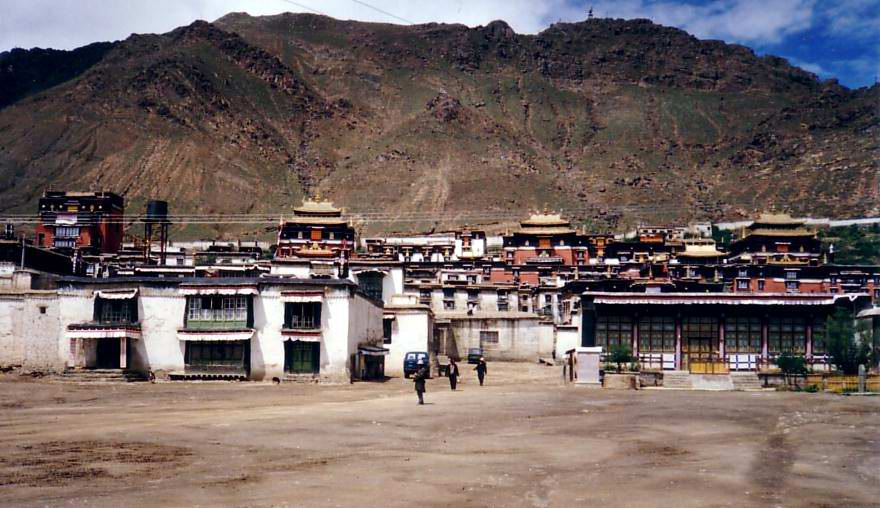
Tashilhunpo shows the influence of Mongol styles of architecture

== Residential housing ==
The highest-grade residences in the past, of course, are the residences of the Dalai Lama and the Panchen Lama. The residences of these officials are very grand, large in scale and rigorous in layout. The main building is three or four stories high. The ground floor is for chores. The second floor is the living room for the whole family. The hall is located in a prominent position on the second floor. The south floor of the main building is used to form a spacious courtyard. The general officials and the manor house have no gallery.

== World Heritage Site ==
Standing at 117 meters in height and 360 meters in width, the Potala Palace, designated as a World Heritage Site in 1994 and extended to include the Norbulingka area in 2001, is considered a most important example of Tibetan architecture. Formerly the residence of the Dalai Lama, it is said to have over a thousand rooms within its thirteen stories, used for both religious purposes and as the (former) seat of the Tibetan government and home of the Dalai Lama, who was Tibet's head of state until 1959. It is divided into the outer White Palace, which serves as the administrative quarters and living quarters of the Dalai Lama, and the inner Red Palace, which houses the Great West Hall, chapels, shrines, and Buddhist scriptures.

== Traditional architecture ==
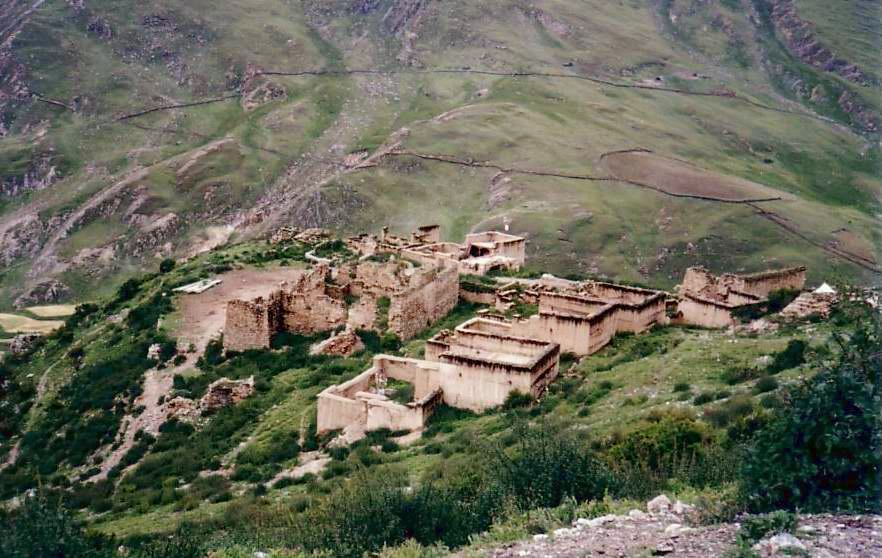
Yerpa monastery ruins

Traditional Kham architecture is seen in most dwellings in Garzê Tibetan Autonomous Prefecture. Although the region has been previously heavily logged, wood is still harvested locally from remaining stands of forest and used for housing. Throughout the region, horizontal timber beams support the roof and are in turn supported by wooden columns. In some areas such as Dêgê County, Baiyü County, and Dawu County, Sichuan, wood is also used to make log-cabin style exterior walls. Home interiors are sometimes paneled with wood and cabinetry is ornately decorated. Ganzi is known for its wooden houses built in a range of styles and lavishly decorated with wooden ornamentation. Although various materials are used in the well-built houses, it is the skillful carpentry that is most striking. Farm houses in Kham are often very spacious although the first (ground) floor is usually used to house farm implements and animals, not for human habitation. Floors, ceilings, and room dividers are made of wood. Carpentry skills are passed down from master to apprentice.

Traditional Tibetan building practices are threatened by the increasing use of concrete, which can be cheaper than natural materials and requires less skill. Traditional homes are regarded by some upwardly mobile Tibetans as backward, and towns and cities are increasingly dominated by apartment buildings. Earthquakes are also a threat to traditional Tibetan houses, which often contain insufficient horizontal ties to keep the columns and roof stable during a seismic event.

== Religious architecture ==
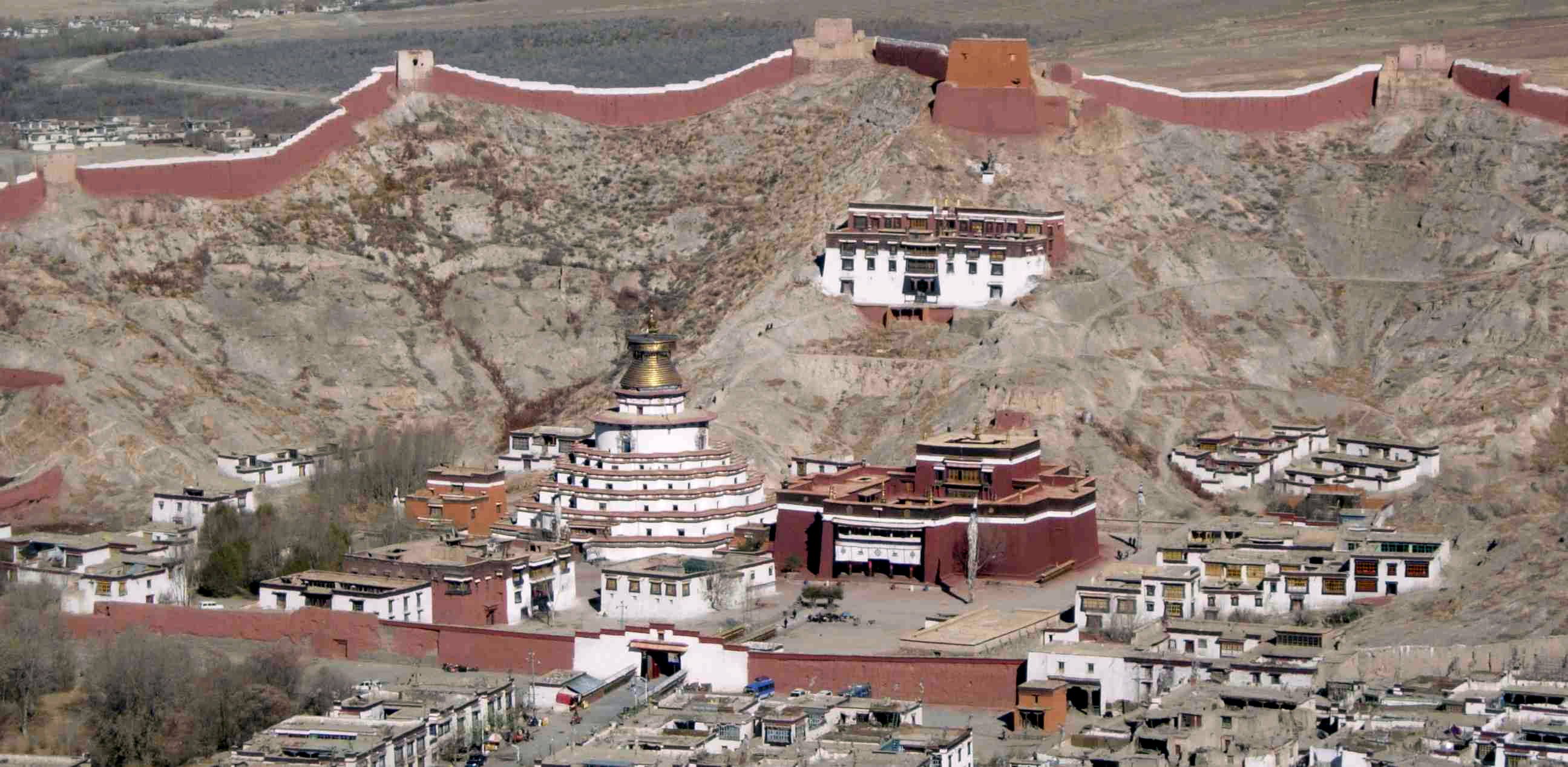
Palcho Monastery

China's Cultural Revolution resulted in the deterioration or loss of Buddhist monasteries, both by intentional destruction or through lack of protection and maintenance. Starting in the 1980s, Tibetans began to restore or rebuild damaged temples and revive monastic traditions.

Tashi Lhunpo Monastery shows the influence of Mongol architecture. Changzhug Monastery is one of the oldest in Tibet, said to have been first built in the 7th century during the reign of King Songtsen Gampo (605?–650 CE). Jokhang was also originally built under Songsten Gampo. Tsurphu Monastery was founded by the first Karmapa, Düsum Khyenpa (1110–1193) in 1159, after he visited the site and laid the foundation for an establishment of a seat there by making offerings to the local protectors, dharmapala and genius loci. In 1189 he revisited the site and founded his main seat there. The monastery grew to hold 1000 monks. Tsozong Gongba Monastery is a small shrine built around the 14th century AD. Palcho Monastery was founded in 1418 and known for its kumbum which has 108 chapels on its four floors. Chokorgyel Monastery, founded in 1509 by Gendun Gyatso, 2nd Dalai Lama once housed 500 monks but was completely destroyed during the Cultural Revolution.

Ramoche Temple is an important temple in Lhasa. The original building complex was strongly influenced by Tang dynasty architectural style as it was first built by Han Chinese architects in the middle of the 7th century. Princess Wencheng took charge of this project and ordered the temple be erected facing east to show her homesickness.

Monasteries such as the Kumbum Monastery continue to be affected by Chinese politics. Simbiling Monastery was completely flattened in 1967, although it has to some degree been restored.

== See also ==
- Tibetan Buddhist architecture
- Tibetan culture
- Architecture of Bhutan
- List of Tibetan monasteries
