= Chokorgyel Monastery =

Buddhist monastery in Tibet

- Tibetan transcription(s); Tibetan: ཆོས་འཁོར་རྒྱལ་དགོན་པ་ Wylie transliteration: Chos 'khor rgyal dgon pa Other transcriptions: Chökorye, Chokhor-gyal
- Location within Tibet

Religion
- Affiliation: Tibetan Buddhism
- Sect: Gelug

Location
- Location: Metoktang Valley, Gyatsa County, Tibet, China
- Country: China
- Interactive map of Chokorgyel Monastery
- Coordinates: 29°27′N 92°43′E

Architecture
- Founder: Gendun Gyatso, 2nd Dalai Lama
- Established: 1509; 517 years ago

Chokorgyel Monastery (Wylie: Chos 'khor rgyal dgon pa; also, Chökorye, Chokhor-gyal) is a Buddhist monastery in Gyatsa County in Tibet, China.

== History ==
In 1509 Gedun Gyatso, the 2nd Dalai Lama, had a meditation cave and founded a hermitage here. The Gelugpa monastery of Chokorgyel (Tibetan: ཆོས་འཁོར་རྒྱལ་དགོན་པ་), is a four-hour hike from the sacred lake, Lhamo La-tso, and about 115 km northeast of Tsetang and about 160 km southeast of Lhasa. The monastery is at an altitude of 4,500 m (14,764 ft), while the lake itself is at an altitude of about 5,000 m. (16,404 ft). It is a small, oval lake - no more than 2 square kilometres in size.

The Dzungar Mongols severely damaged the monastery in 1718, although it was rebuilt immediately by the Regent Kangchene, although little, if anything ancient would have survived until the time of the arrival of the Chinese in 1959.

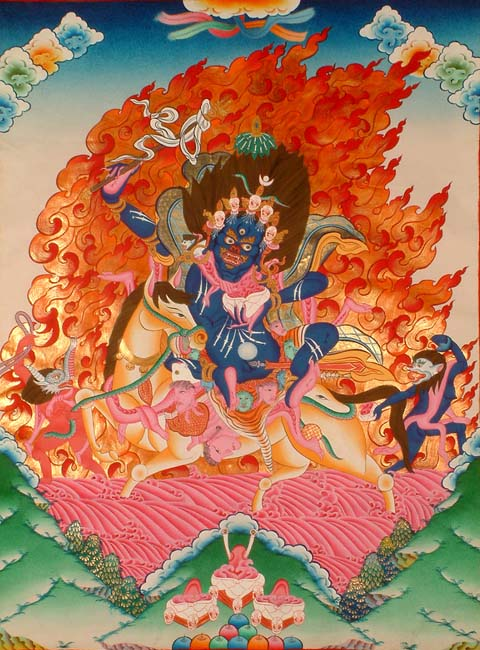
Palden Lhamo

It is said that Palden Lhamo, the female guardian spirit of the sacred lake, Lhamo La-tso, promised the 1st Dalai Lama in one of his visions "that she would protect the reincarnation lineage of the Dalai Lamas." Ever since the time of Gendun Gyatso, the 2nd Dalai Lama, who formalised the system, and senior monks have since regularly visited the lake to seek guidance on choosing the next reincarnations. particularly of the Dalai and Panchen lamas, through visions while meditating there.

The monastery was an important halting-place for many senior lamas on their treks to and from the 'Vision Lake', Lhamo Lha-so. It once housed 500 monks but was completely destroyed during the Cultural Revolution when every bit of wood was removed from the buildings, leaving only roofless walls. The main hall has since been rebuilt and a few monks have taken up residence once again.

== Description of the Monastery and its surroundings ==
The monastery is situated between three mountains. Mount Zhidag to the north is the "white" residence of the ancient Bonpo protector of the earth, Shidrak, at the foot of which is the Dalai Lamas' residence. Higher up are the remains of a temple in which is the footprint of Damchen Choje, the 'Dharma Protector Bound to Service'. Above this was the now-destroyed meditation cave of the 2nd Dalai Lama, although his footprint in stone has survived in a mani wall. The mountain to the south, Shridevi, is the "blue" residence of the Protectress Palden Lhamo on which the dundro or sky burial site is located, and to the east, Mount Begtse, the "red" mountain residence of Protector Begtse, or Chamsing, who was imported by the Gelugpa from Mongolia. On the eastern slope of this mountain is an ancient interdenominational Red Hat gompa called Nyingsaka (composed from: Nyingma, Sakya and Kagyu).

The monastery is in the upper Metoktang Valley in the old province of Dakpo at the "geomantically powerful confluence of three rivers."

The monastery was originally built in a triangular form to reflect the symbolism of its position at the confluence of three rivers and surrounded by three mountains and also represents the conjunction of the three elements of water, earth and fire, as well as the female principle of Palden Lhamo in the form of an inverted triangle. The ruins, with their massive walls include two monastic colleges or dratsangs and two large temples, the Lukhang and Tsuklakhang.

At the centre of the monastery complex there is a small pillar engraved with sutras and a Buddhist swastika. The Lukhang, to the west of this, is the temple of the Serpent Protectors, which was built over the original hermitage of the 2nd Dalai Lama. It is said to have been built by red eagles (kyungka, garudas). On the walls of the main temple, the Tsuklakang to the north, damaged murals can still be seen. This used to house a large statue of Mipam Gompo which dated back to the founding of the monastery.

South of the walls is the Shinje Melong or 'Mirror of the Lord of Death' - a polished grey granite stone in which it is said horoscopes may be read as in a crystal ball, and is also used in rain-making ceremonies.
