= Nechung =

Tibetan Buddhist monastery in Lhasa, Tibet, China

Nechung Monastery
- Tibetan transcription(s); Tibetan: གནས་ཆུང་ལྕོག; Wylie transliteration: gnas-chung lcog Official transcription (China): Naiqung Gönba; Chinese transcription(s); Traditional: 乃琼寺
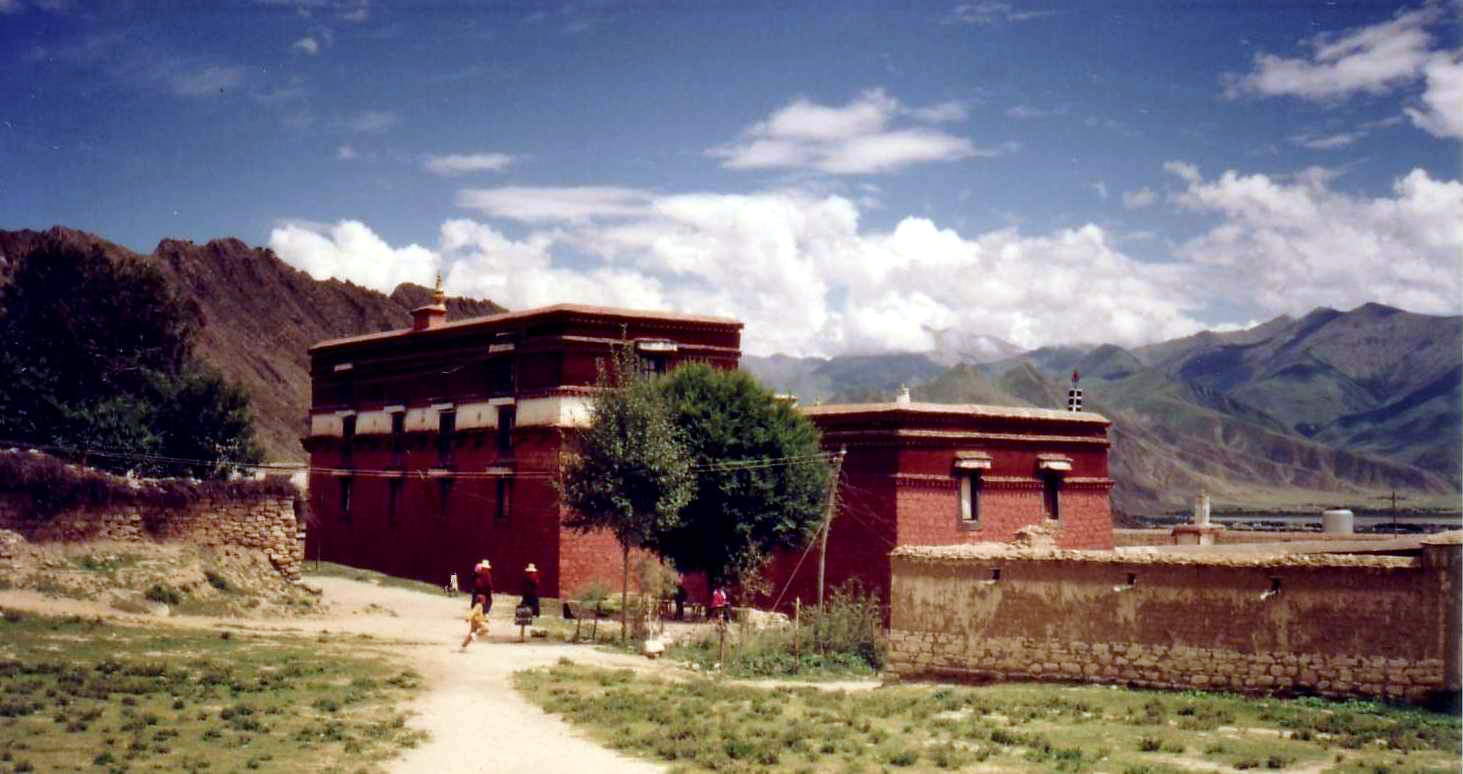

- Location within Tibet

Religion
- Affiliation: Tibetan Buddhism
- Sect: Nyingma

Location
- Location: Doilungdêqên District, Lhasa, Tibet Autonomous Region, China
- Country: China
- Interactive map of Nechung Monastery
- Coordinates: 29°40′17″N 91°3′21″E

Nechung Monastery, Nechung Gompa (Tibetan: གནས་ཆུང་དགོན་པ།, Wylie: gnas-chung lcog, ZWPY: Naiqung Gönba) or Nechung Chok (Tibetan: གནས་ཆུང་ལྕོག, ZWPY: Naiqung Jog "the small dwelling", Chinese: 乃琼寺), is the seat of the State Oracle of Tibet. It is also referred to as Sungi Gyelpoi Tsenkar, the "Demon Fortress of the Oracle King."

It is about 10-minute walk down from Drepung Monastery, and was the residence of the three-headed, six-armed Pehar Gyalpo, the chief protector of the Gelugs (Yellow Hat sect) and the seat of the State Oracle or Nechung Oracle. It is a medium-sized temple which used to house about a hundred monks.

== History and functions ==
It was the seat of State Oracle until 1959 when he fled with the Dalai Lama to India who now lives in exile in Dharamsala, India. The Dalai Lamas traditionally always consulted him before making an important decision.

It was the residence of the Protector Pehar, a deity of the Horpa, who lived to the east of (Lake) Kokonor. According to tradition, he is held to have been originally brought to Samye Monastery by Padmasambhava who bound him to protect the dharma. An alternative story is that he was brought back by a Bon general, Tara Lugong, who took possession of the meditation school near Kanchow of the Bhaţa Hor, a tribe of Uighurs, about the end of the 8th century CE. Pehar was regarded as the guardian deity of the treasures of Samye Monastery and, later, as the 'protector of religion'.

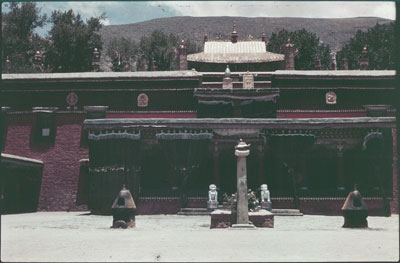
The main temple of Nechung monastery, with pillar or doring (rdo ring), 2 incense burners and 2 stone lions behind, before 1950

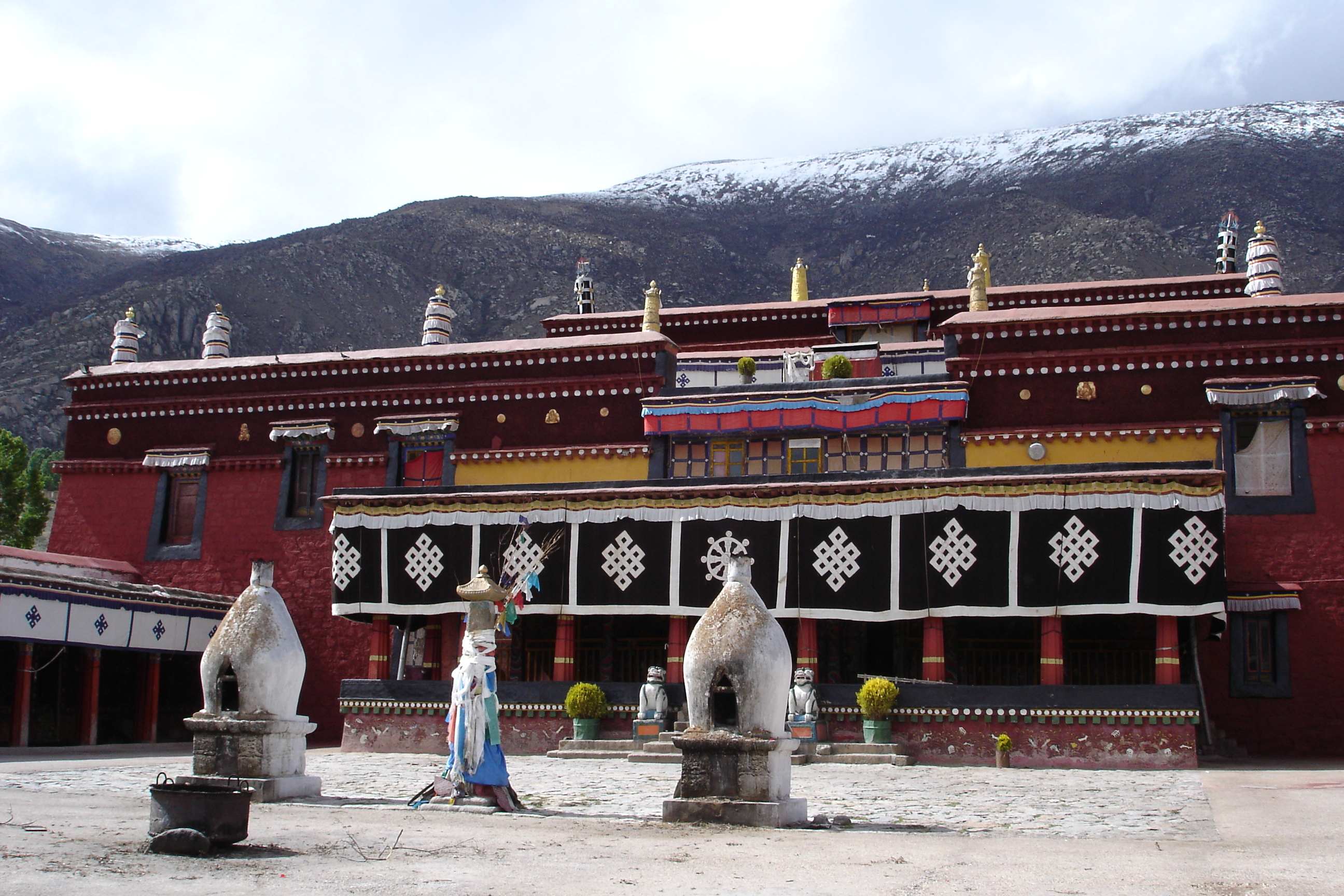
Main temple in 2006

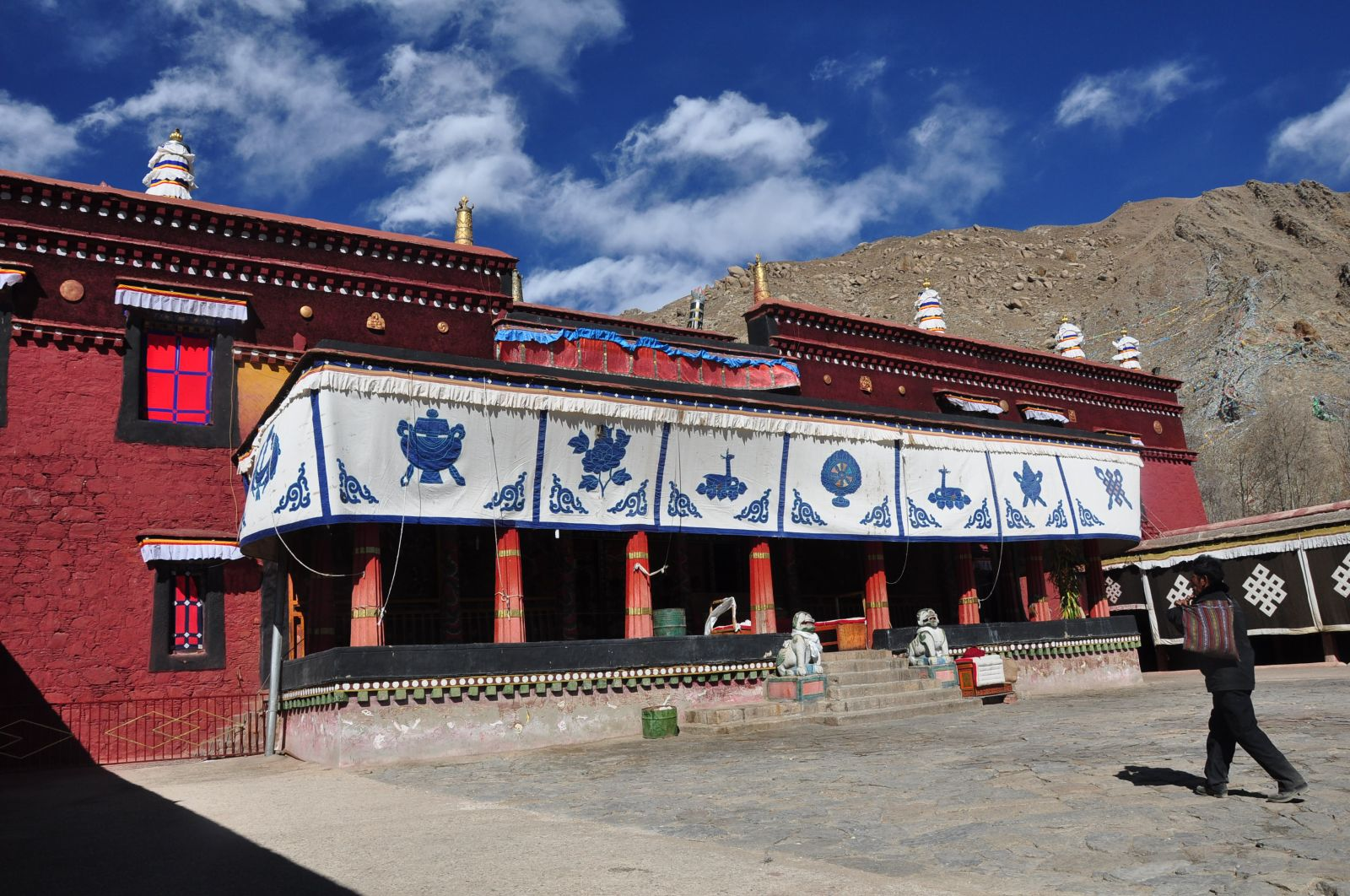
Main temple in 2010

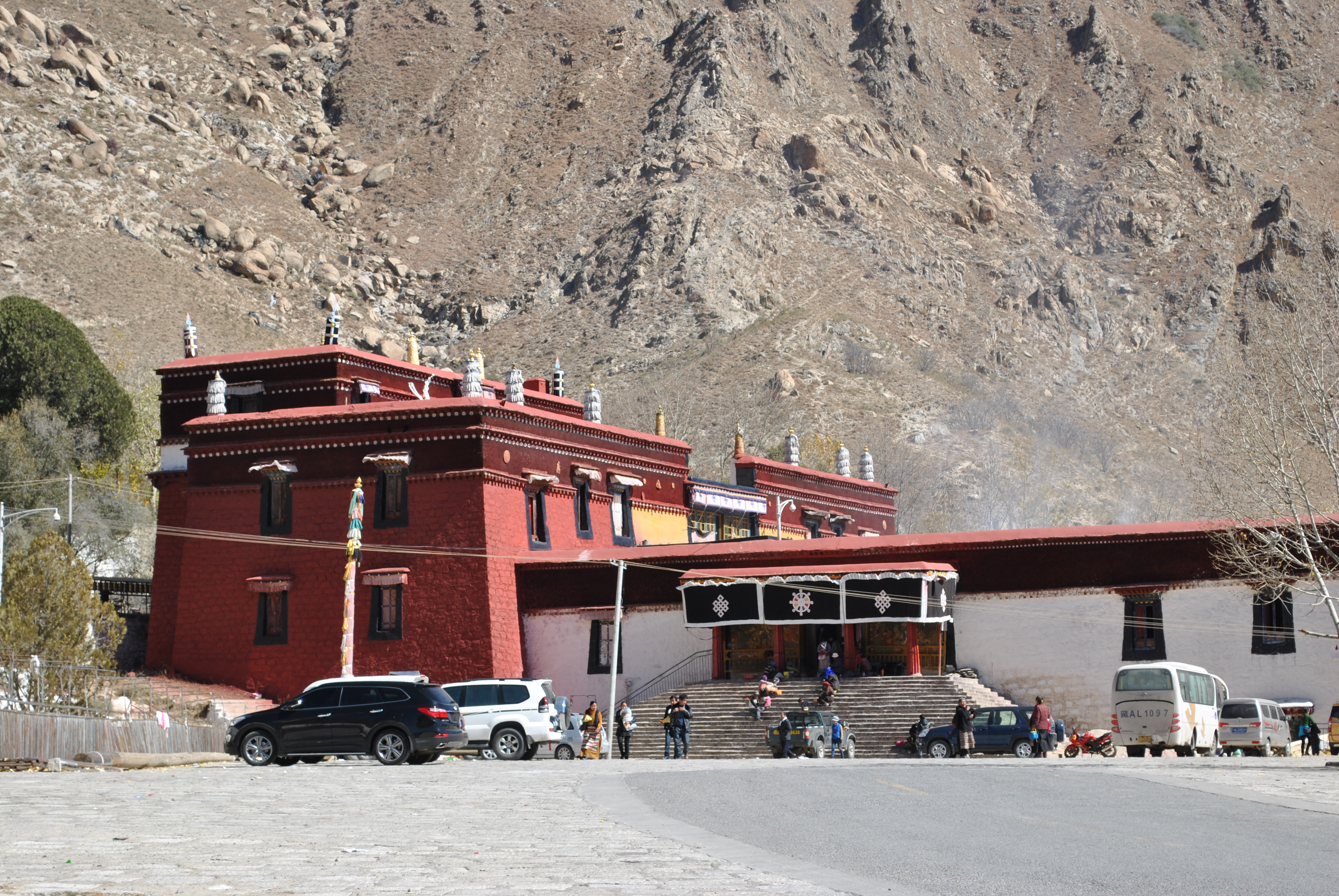
Nechung, 2013

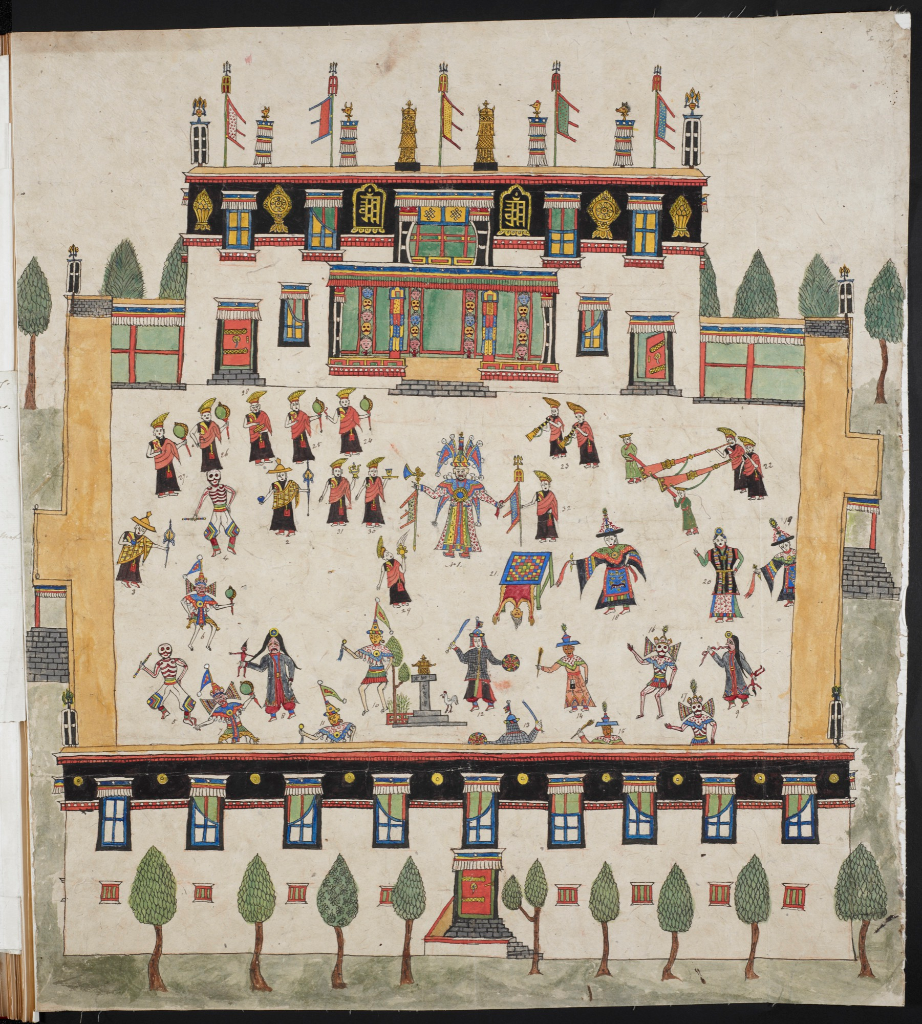
Nechung in art from 1850s

During the time of Lobsang Gyatso, the Fifth Dalai Lama (r. 1642–1682), Pehar was first moved from Samye to Tse Gugtang and then to the present site of Nechung Monastery.

Although the State Oracle is a Nyingma monk, he has been adopted by the Gelugpas and is now chosen for his receptivity to possession by Pehar during trance. He is considered to be the medium of Dorje Drakden, one of Pehar's aspects.

According to belief, when the State Oracle is possessed by Pehar, he becomes very agitated, with tongue lolling, bloodshot eyes and displays superhuman strength, lifting heavy weights, twisting swords, etc. He mumbles words which are recorded and then interpreted by monks and also blesses grain which is thrown to the crowd.

Unlike most Central Asian shamans, who are thought to leave their bodies when in a trance-like state and travel to the land of the spirits from where they bring back messages, Tibetan oracles act "as a mouthpiece for the gods or spirits who possess him and speak through him, very often without his own knowledge of what is being said, answering directly the questions of those who consult him." The tradition of oracles was inherited from the pre-Buddhist religion of Tibet, Bön. The "great" Fifth Dalai Lama was "the first to institutionalise the State Oracle of Nächung."

Nechung was almost completely destroyed during the Cultural Revolution and annexation of Tibet by China, though now, it has been largely restored and there is a huge new statue of Guru Rinpoche (Padmasambhava) on the second floor. There is a college of debate to the east of Nechung which is once again attended by young students.

A new Nechung Monastery has been built in Dharamsala, India.

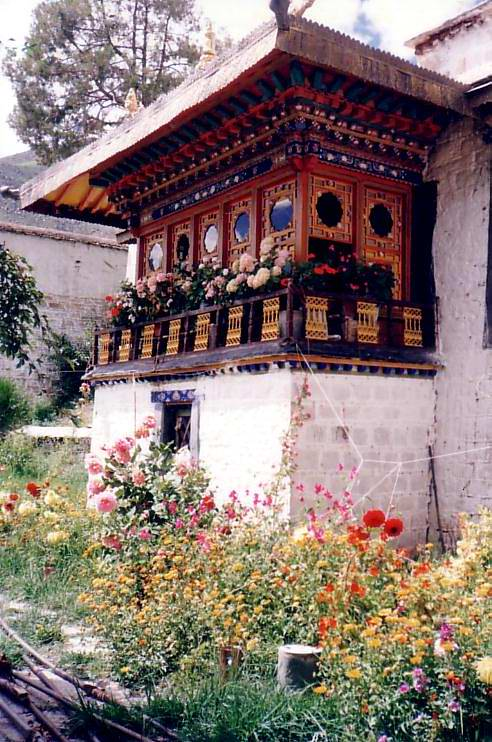
Retreat of the 13th Dalai Lama, Nechung, Tibet

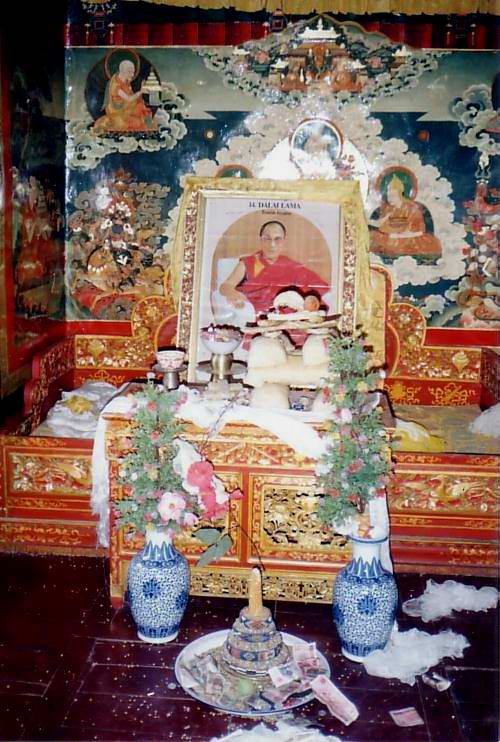
Throne awaiting Dalai Lama's return. Retreat of the 13th Dalai Lama, Nechung, Tibet.

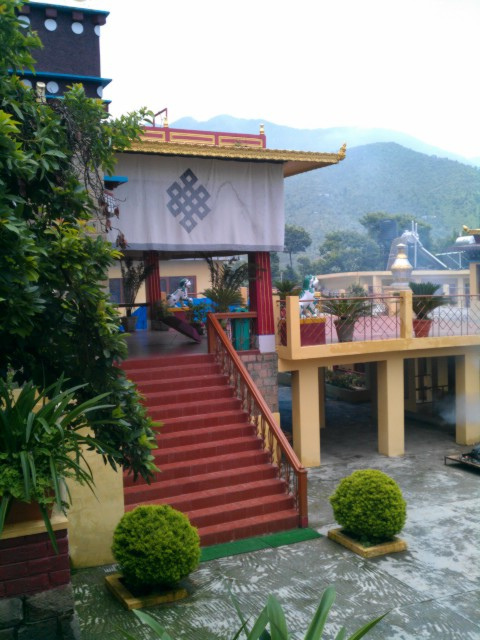
Nechung in Dharamsala, India

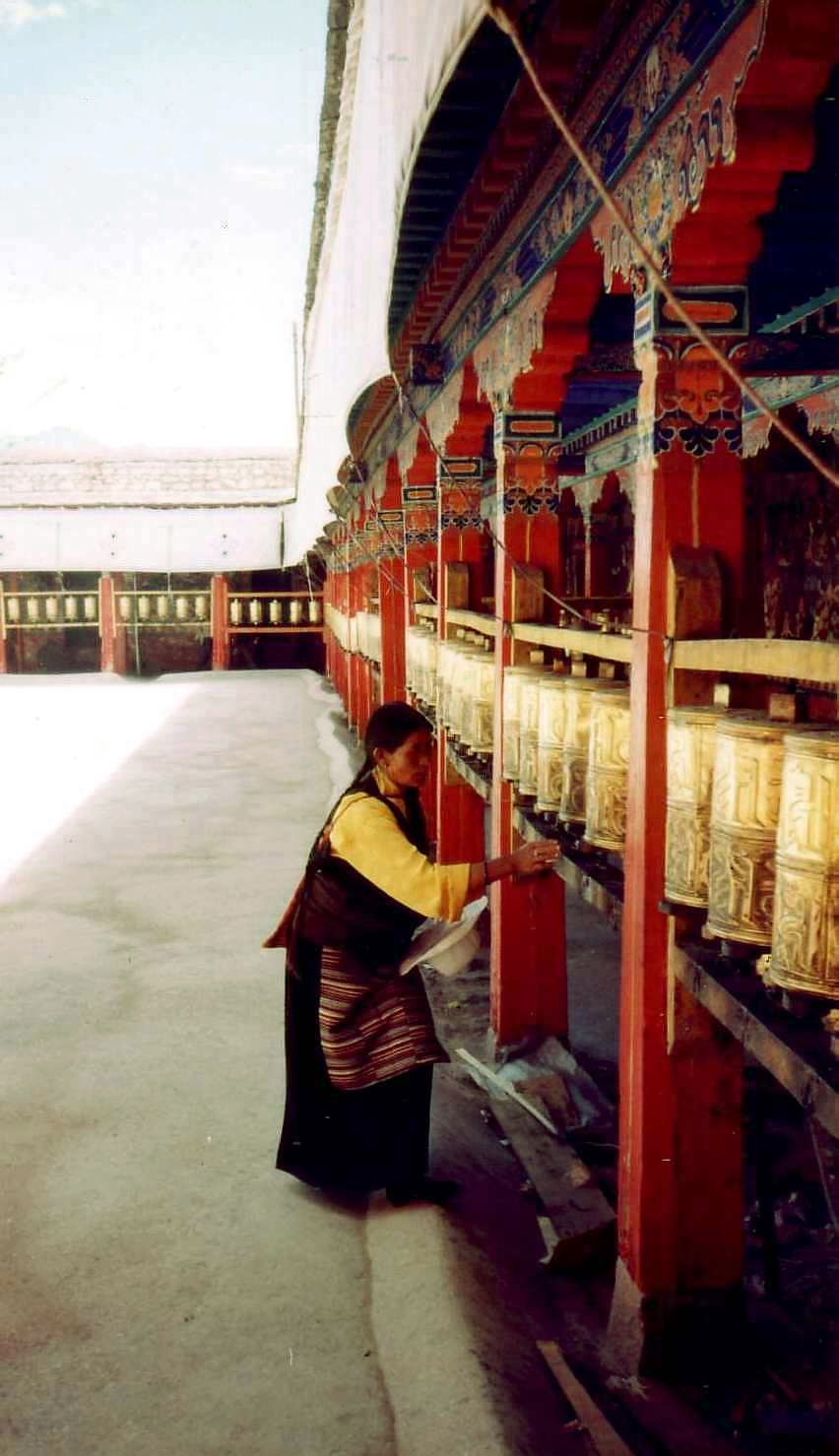
Prayer wheels at Nechung Chok, Lhasa
