= Palden Lhamo =

Female Tibetan Buddhist deity

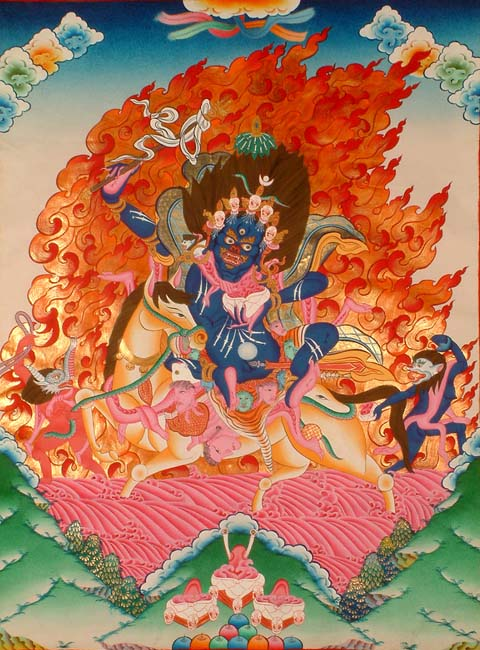
A thangka of Palden Lhamo, guardian deity of Tawang Monastery, Arunachal Pradesh, India

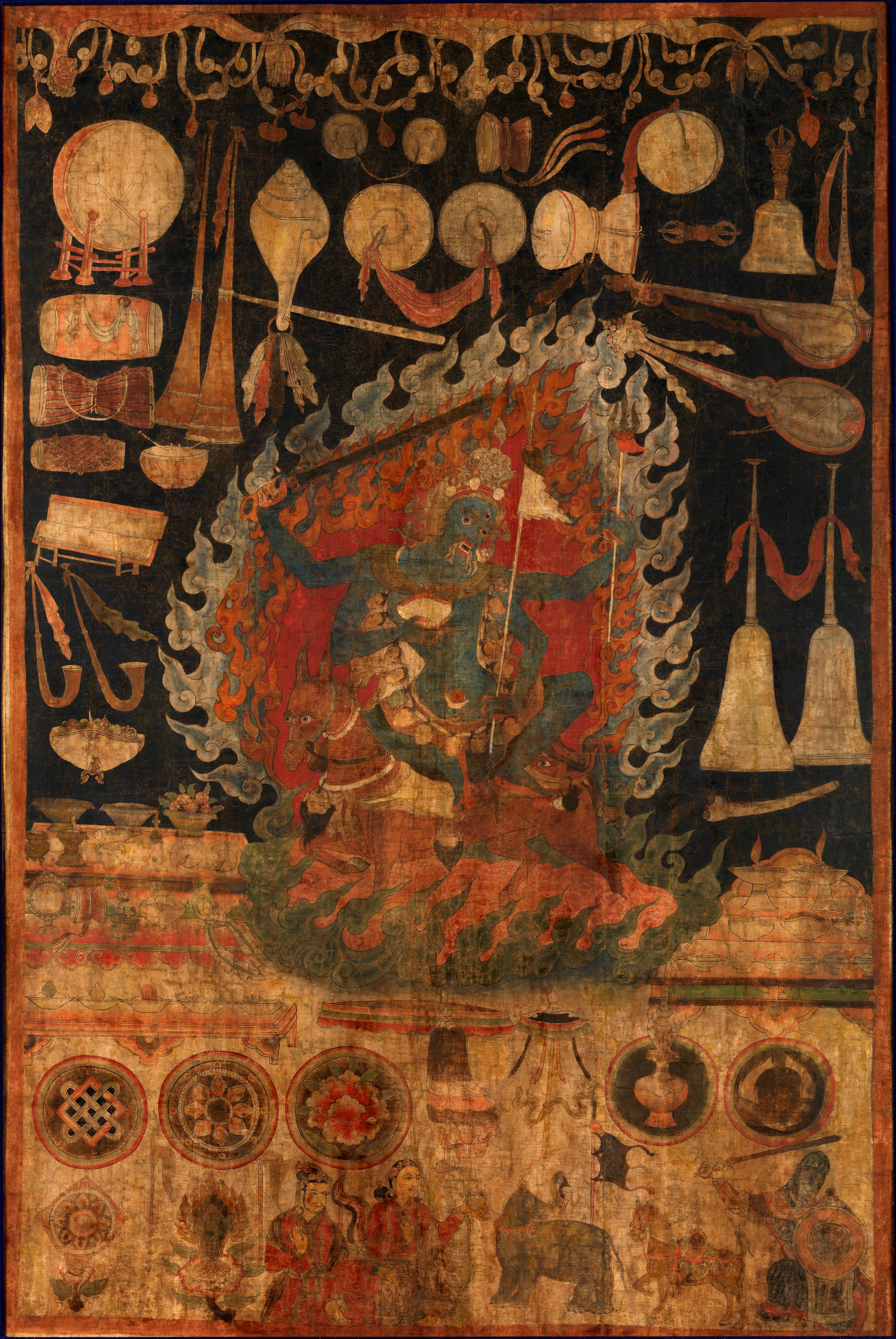
Offerings to the Goddess Palden Lhamo, Tibet. Late 16th Century distemper on cloth, 67 x 44 1/8 in. Palden Lhamo is the principal protectress of Tibet and the only female of the Eight Guardians of the dharma. This black-ground (Tibetan: nag thang) painting was installed in the chapel (gonkhang) dedicated to the wrathful protective deities (dharmapalas), a room reserved for tantric initiation rites within a Tibetan monastery.

Palden Lhamo ("Glorious Goddess", Tibetan: དཔལ་ལྡན་ལྷ་མོ།, Wylie: dpal ldan lha mo, Lhasa dialect: [pantɛ̃ l̥amo], Sanskrit: Śrīdēvī) or Shri Devi is a Vajrayana Buddhist dharmapala who appears in various forms. She is considered an enlightened being by Tibetan Buddhists.

Palden Lhamo is the special dharmapala of the Dalai Lamas, while the three protectors of his Gelug school of Tibetan Buddhism are Yamaraja, Vaisravana, and Mahakala. She is the wrathful deity considered to be the principal protectress of Tibet.

Palden Lhamo appears in the retinue of the Obstacle-Removing Mahakala, either as an independent figure or associated to Ekajati, and has been described as "the tutelary deity of Tibet and its government", and as "celebrated all over Tibet and Mongolia, and the potent protector of the Dalai and Panchen Lamas and Lhasa."

== Origins ==
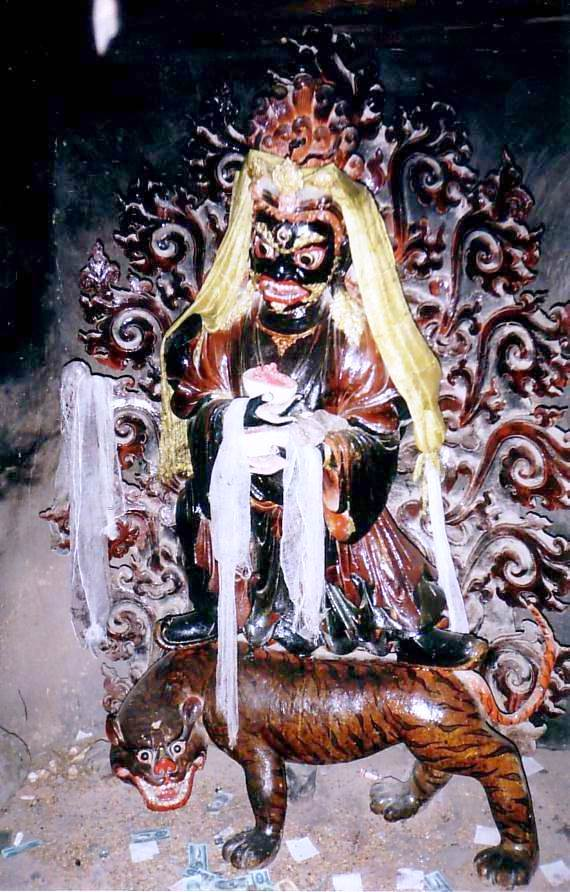
Palden Lhamo, Gyantse Gompa. 1993

Palden Lhamo means "Glorious Goddess" and can feature a wide range of wrathful female protectors and dakinis. Usually, Palden Lhamo refers to the Gelugpa version of her as a wrathful emanation of Tara.

Magzor Gyalmo was said to be named Remati during the time she was married to the evil king of Lanka, both of them rakshasas according to one version. Remati vowed that if she failed to convert the king to Buddhism and dispel his wickedness, she would end his dynasty. She tried many times to convert him to avoid the killing of dharma practitioners but failed along with their son being raised to kill Buddhists. With no choice, she slaughtered her son while her husband was out hunting. She ate her son's flesh, drank his blood with his skull as a kapala or cup, and flayed his skin to make a saddle.

She escaped out towards the north. Just as she left on a mule, the king returned and found out about his son's murder. Enraged, he shot the rump of the mule that Remati was riding. In response, Remati healed the wound and transformed it into an eye by stating, "May the wound of my mount become an eye large enough to watch over the twenty-four regions, and may I myself be the one to extirpate the lineage of the malignant kings of Lanka!". There, she traveled onwards through India to Tibet to China to Mongolia and was said to have finally settled down on the mountain, Oikhan in eastern Siberia.

When she died, she was reborn in hell and fought her way out of hell, stealing a bag of diseases and a sword. When she escaped to the charnel grounds, she found no peace and prayed to the Buddha for a reason to live. The Buddha Vajradhara (tantric Shakyamuni) appeared before her and requested her to protect the dharma. Astonished, Remati agreed and thus arose as the dharmapala she is, only using her weapons against enemies of Buddhism. She was also appointed as a guardian of dharma by Yama, lord of death. Her retinue consists of the lion-headed dakini Simhamukha (Sengdongma) behind her and the Makara-headed dakini Makaravaktra holding the reins of the mule in front of Palden Lhamo. Surrounding them are the 4 Goddesses of the Seasons, the 5 Sisters of Long Life, and the 12 Tenma goddesses.

== Palden Lhamo and the lake Lhamo La-tso ==
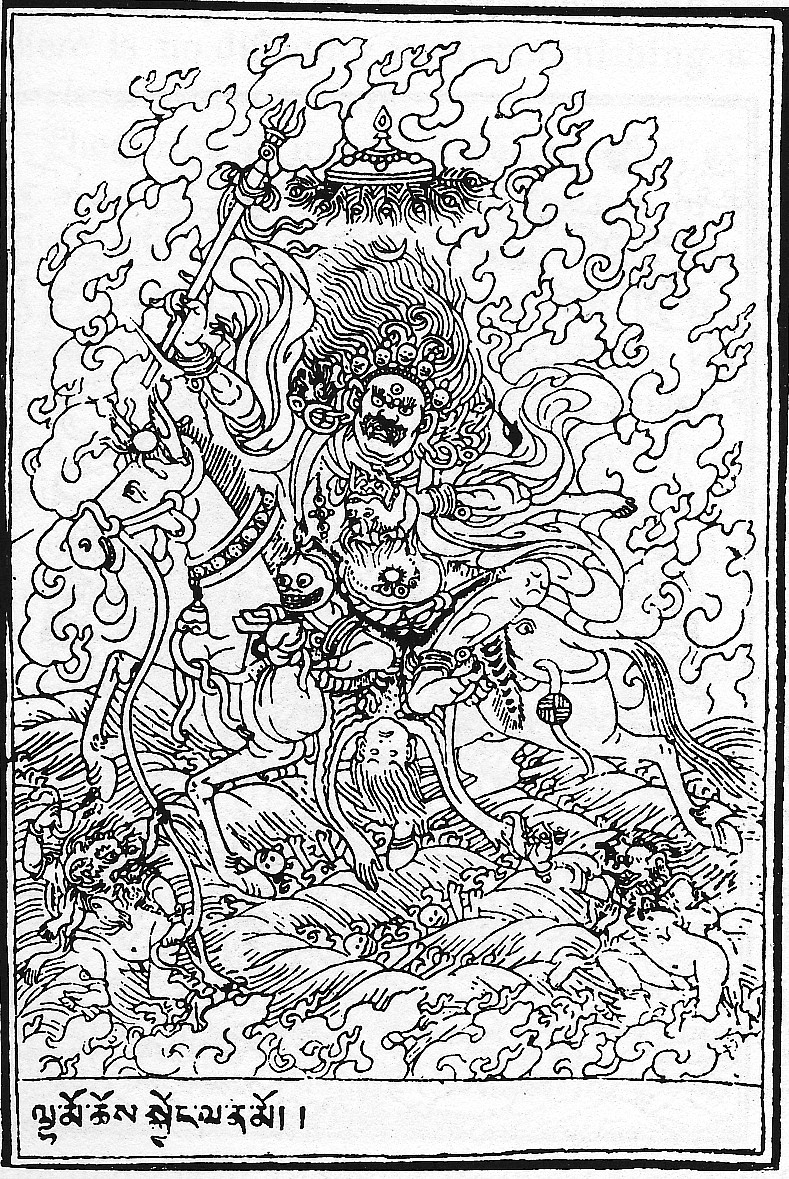
Palden Lhamo line drawing from the 1895 book Tibetan Buddhism by L. Austine Wadell

Palden Lhamo, as the female guardian spirit of the sacred lake, Lhamo La-tso, promised the 1st Dalai Lama in a vision "that she would protect the reincarnation lineage of the Dalai Lamas." Since the 2nd Dalai Lama, who formalised the system, regents and other monks have gone to the lake to meditate and seek guidance on choosing the next reincarnation through visions.

The particular form of Palden Lhamo at Lhamo La-tso is Gyelmo Makzor Ma (Wylie: rgyal mo dmag zor ma "Queen Torma Mother") or Machik Pellha Zhiwé Nyamchen (Wylie: ma gcig dpal lha zhi ba'i nyams can "Pacified Expression of the Common Wife Palden Lhamo"), an unusually peaceful form of Palden Lhamo. The lake is sometimes referred to as "Palden Lhamo Kalidevi", indicating that she is an emanation of the goddess Kali.

The mountain to the south of Chokorgyel Monastery is the "blue" residence of Palden Lhamo, on which a sky burial site is located. The monastery was originally built in a triangular form to reflect the symbolism of its position at the confluence of three rivers and surrounded by three mountains and also represents the conjunction of the three elements of water, earth and fire, as well as the female principle of Palden Lhamo in the symbolic form of an inverted triangle.

== Traditional accounts ==
It is said that, during the reign of Songtsän Gampo (605 or 617? – 649 CE), Palden Lhamo outdid all the other protector-deities in her promise to protect the king's Trulang shrine. She presented an iron cup and pledged "Erect an image of me, and I shall protect this royal shrine from any future damage by humans and mamo demons!' She is also said to have advised Lhalung Pelgyi Dorje to kill the anti-Buddhist king Langdarma in 841 CE, and is described as the 'Dharma-protectress of Lhasa'.

== Description ==
She is the only female among the traditional 'Eight Guardians of the Law' and is usually depicted as deep blue in colour and with red hair to symbolise her wrathful nature, crossing a sea of blood riding side-saddle on a white mule. The mule has an eye on its left rump where her angry husband's arrow hit it after she killed her son, who was destined, and being raised to be the one to finally put an end to Buddhism, and used his skin as a saddle blanket. She has three eyes and is often shown drinking blood from a human skull.
