= Tenma goddesses =

Twelve guardian deities in Tibetan Buddhism

The Tenma goddesses are twelve guardian deities in Tibetan Buddhism. In hierarchy, they fall under Palden Lhamo, one of the eight Dharmapala deities. Other times, they are part of the retinue of the Bönpo goddess, Sidpa Gyalmo. Formerly, the 12 Tenma were said to have been local protectors of Tibet before the spread of Buddhism until they came to Padmasambhava's Asura Cave in the Pharping region of Nepal while Padmasambhava was subduing many deities and spirits. Some stories say that the goddesses were hostile to the spread of Buddhism during this time while others said that they refused to give their life essence to Padmasambhava and wanted to keep protecting Tibet. Either ways, Padmasabhava defeated them and bound them to an oath to protect the dharma.

In Dharamsala, India, there is a Tenma oracle, for which a young Tibetan woman is the kuten, which literally means, "the physical basis".

== See also ==
- Nechung Oracle
- Trance
