= Lhamo La-tso =

- Location within Tibet
- Location: Tibet
- Coordinates: 29°31′0.0″N 92°44′17.0″E
- Type: Lake

Lhamo Latso or Lha-mo La-tso (Tibetan: ལྷ་མོའི་བླ་མཚོ།, Wylie: Lha mo'i bla mtsho) is a small oval oracle lake where senior Tibetan monks of the Gelug sect go for visions to assist in the discovery of reincarnations of the Dalai Lamas. Other pilgrims also come to seek visions. It is considered to be the most sacred lake in Tibet.

It is also known as "The Spiritual-Lake of the Goddess", the goddess being Palden Lhamo, the principal Protectress of Tibet. Other names include: Tso Lhamo (mTsho Lha mo), Chokhorgyelgi Namtso (Chos 'khor rgyal gyi gnam mtsho) and Makzorma (dmag zor ma) and, on old maps, as Cholamo.

== Palden Lhamo and Lhamo Latso ==
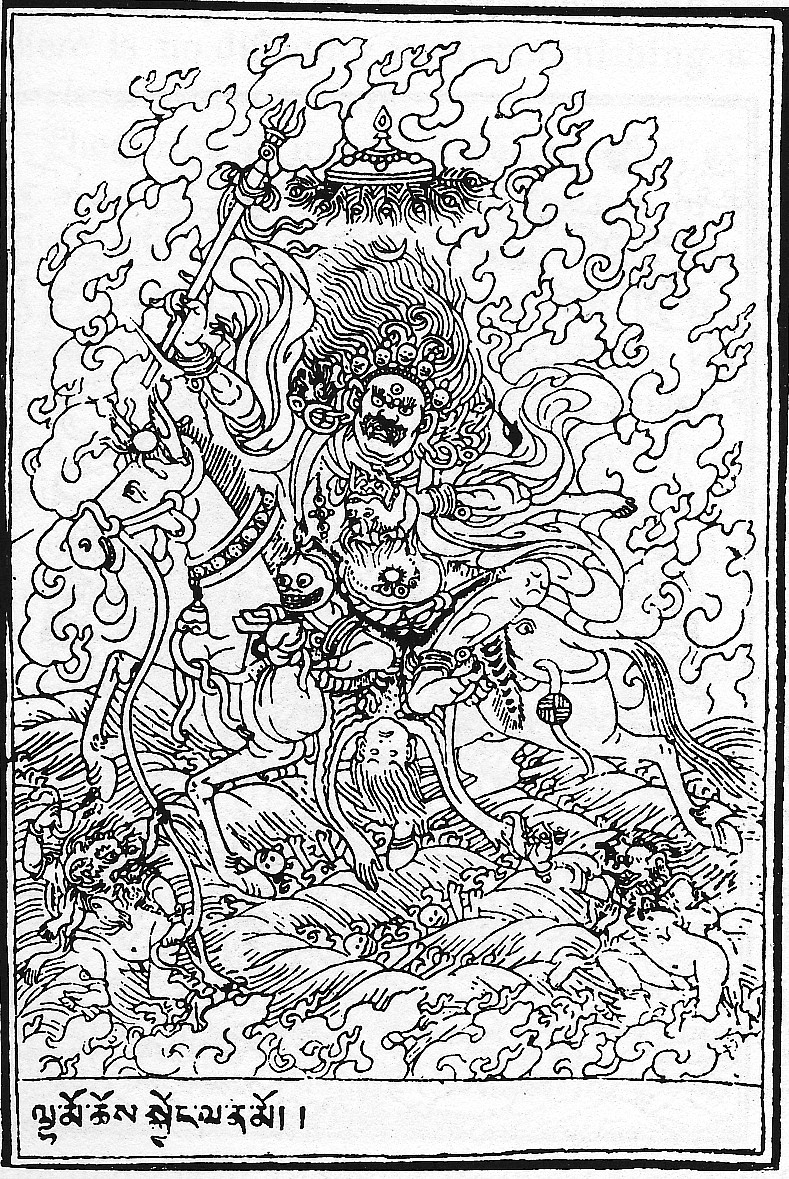
Palden Lhamo

It is said that Palden Lhamo, as the female guardian spirit of the Lhamo Latso promised the 1st Dalai Lama in one of his visions "that she would protect the reincarnation lineage of the Dalai Lamas." Ever since the time of the 2nd Dalai Lama, who formalised the system, the regents and other monks have gone to the lake to seek guidance on choosing the next reincarnation through visions while meditating there.

The particular form of Palden Lhamo at Lhamo Latso is Jemo Maksoma (Wylie: rgyal mo dmag zor ma, "The Victorious Queen who Turns Back Enemies". The lake is sometimes referred to as "Palden Lhamo Kalideva", which indicates that she may be the Buddhist form of the same Goddess known in the Hindu traditions as Kali, shakti of Shiva. Jemo Maksoma, also called Machik Pellha Shiwé Nyamchen (Wylie: Ma gcig dPal lha Zhi ba'i Nyams can), this is an unusually peaceful form of Palden Lhamo.

The mountain to the south of Chokorgyel Monastery, Shridevi, is the "blue" residence of Palden Lhamo on which a sky burial site is located. The monastery was originally built in a triangular form to reflect the symbolism of its position at the confluence of three rivers and surrounded by three mountains and also represents the conjunction of the three elements of water, earth and fire, as well as the female principle of Palden Lhamo in the form of an inverted triangle.

Lhamo Latso... [is] a brilliant azure jewel set in a ring of grey mountains. The elevation and the surrounding peaks combine to give it a highly changeable climate, and the continuous passage of cloud and wind creates a constantly moving pattern on the surface of the waters. On that surface visions appear to those who seek them in the right frame of mind.

It was here that in 1935, the Regent, Reting Rinpoche, received a clear vision of three Tibetan letters and of a monastery with a jade-green and gold roof, and a house with turquoise roof tiles, which led to the discovery of Tenzin Gyatso, the present 14th Dalai Lama.

== Geographical setting ==
Lhamo Latso is in Gyaca County, Lhokha Province southeast of Lhasa, a four-hour hike from the Gelugpa Chokorgyel Monastery at an altitude of about 5,300 metres (17,400 ft) and covers an area of only about 2 square kilometres (0.77 sq mi).

Chokorgyel Monastery itself is about 115 kilometres (71 mi) northeast of Tsetang and about 160 km (99 mi) southeast of Lhasa, at an altitude of 4,500 metres (14,800 ft).

The old path from Chokorgyel Monastery used to be paved to make access easier for the senior monks wishing to visit the lake. Halfway along is a diamond-shaped pond fed by glaciers known as Yoni Lake. On a ridge near the top of the pass overlooking the lake a ritual shökde or throne was built for the Dalai Lama, where he once sat to divine the future while gazing into the lake about 1 kilometre (0.62 mi) in front and 150 metres (490 ft) lower down. Nowadays it is buried under a mound of silk scarves (hadak).

Many pilgrims come each year to Lhamo Latso believing that, with proper devoutness, and after fasting for three days and refraining from talk, they will be rewarded with a revelation of their future in the skull-shaped mirror of the lake. Previously there was a temple to Jemo Maksoma at the eastern end of the lake; the site is now marked only by prayer flags and offerings left by pilgrims.

There is a kora (circumambulatory pilgrimage) around Lhamo La-tso.
