= Oracle =

Provider of prophecies or insights

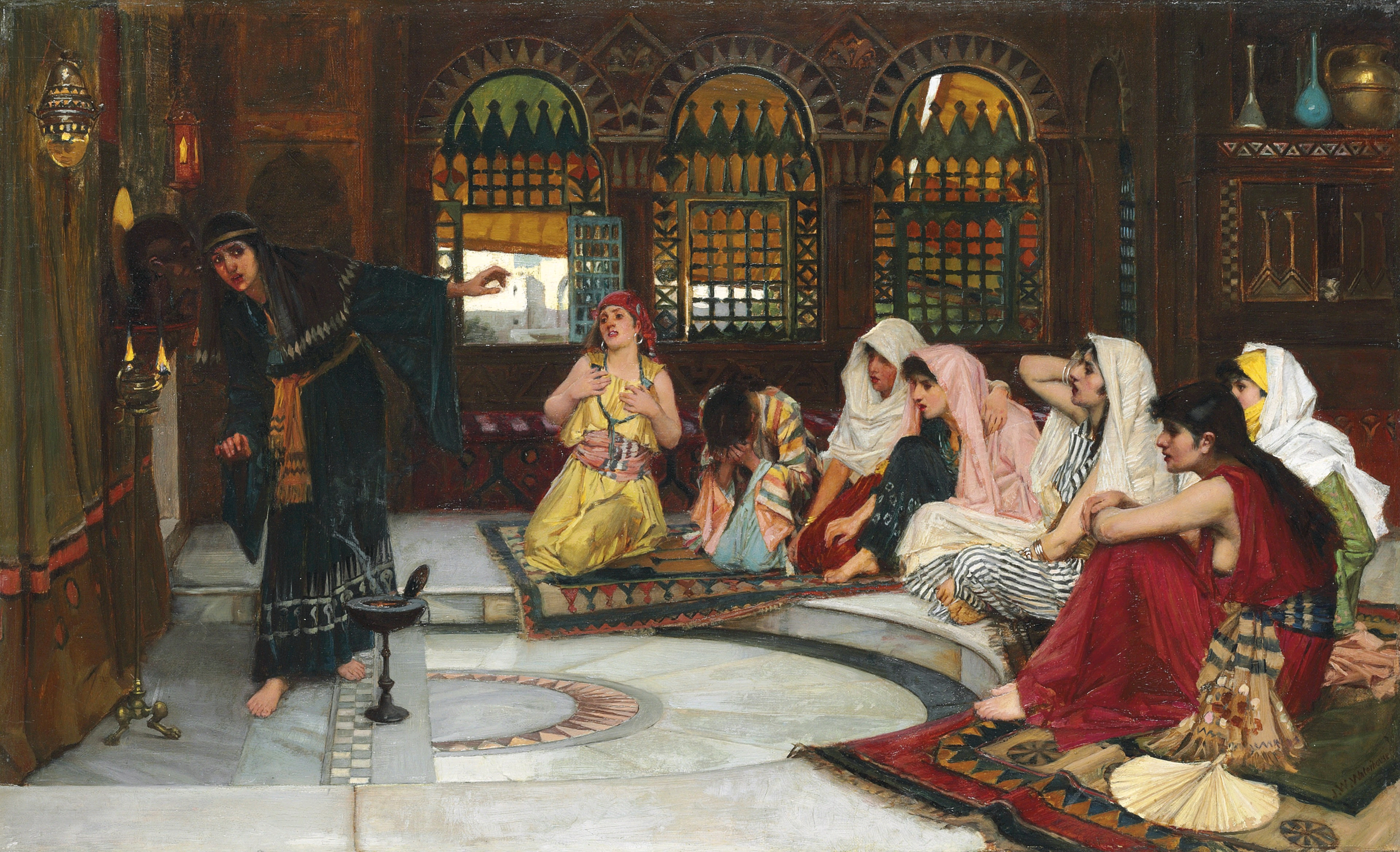
Consulting the Oracle (1884) by John William Waterhouse, showing eight priestesses in a temple of prophecy

An oracle is a person or thing considered to provide insight, wise counsel or prophetic predictions, most notably including precognition of the future, inspired by deities. If done through occultic means, it is a form of divination.

== Description ==
The word oracle comes from the Latin verb ōrāre, "to speak" and properly refers to the priest or priestess uttering the prediction. In extended use, oracle may also refer to the site of the oracle, and the oracular utterances themselves, are called khrēsmoí (χρησμοί) in Greek.

Oracles were thought to be portals through which the gods spoke directly to people. In this sense, they were different from seers (manteis, μάντεις) who interpreted signs sent by the gods through bird signs, animal entrails, and other various methods.

The most important oracles of Greek antiquity were Pythia (priestess to Apollo at Delphi), and the oracle of Dione and Zeus at Dodona in Epirus. Other oracles of Apollo were located at Didyma and Mallus on the coast of Anatolia, at Corinth and Bassae in the Peloponnese, and at the islands of Delos and Aegina in the Aegean Sea.

The Sibylline Oracles are a collection of oracular utterances written in Greek hexameters, ascribed to the Sibyls, prophetesses who uttered divine revelations in frenzied states.

== Origins ==
Walter Burkert observes that "Frenzied women from whose lips the God speaks" are recorded in the Near East as in Mari in the second millennium BC and in Assyria in the first millennium BC. In Egypt, the goddess Wadjet (eye of the moon) was depicted as a snake-headed woman or a woman with two snake-heads. Her oracle was in the renowned temple in Per-Wadjet (Greek name Buto). The oracle of Wadjet may have been the source for the oracular tradition which spread from Egypt to Greece. Evans linked Wadjet with the "Minoan Snake Goddess".

At the oracle of Dodona, she is called Diōnē (the feminine form of Diós, genitive of Zeus; or of dīos, "godly", literally "heavenly"), who represents the earth-fertile soil, probably the chief female goddess of the proto-Indo-European pantheon. Python, daughter (or son) of Gaia was the earth dragon of Delphi represented as a serpent and became the chthonic deity, enemy of Apollo, who slew her and possessed the oracle.

== In Greco-Roman culture ==
=== Pythia at Delphi ===
When the Prytanies' seat shines white in the island of Siphnos,
White-browed all the forum—need then of a true seer's wisdom—
Danger will threat from a wooden boat, and a herald in scarlet.

— The Pythoness, in The Histories, Herodotus.

The Pythia was the mouthpiece of the oracles of the god Apollo, and was also known as the Oracle of Delphi.

The Delphic Oracle exerted considerable influence throughout Hellenic culture. Distinctively, this woman was essentially the highest authority both civilly and religiously in male-dominated ancient Greece. She responded to the questions of citizens, foreigners, kings, and philosophers on issues of political impact, war, duty, crime, family, laws—even personal issues. The semi-Hellenic countries around the Greek world, such as Lydia, Caria, and even Egypt also respected her and came to Delphi as supplicants.

Croesus, king of Lydia beginning in 560 BC, tested the oracles of the world to discover which gave the most accurate prophecies. He sent out emissaries to seven sites who were all to ask the oracles on the same day what the king was doing at that very moment. Croesus proclaimed the oracle at Delphi to be the most accurate, who correctly reported that the king was making a lamb-and-tortoise stew, and so he graced her with a magnitude of precious gifts. He then consulted Delphi before attacking Persia, and according to Herodotus was advised: "If you cross the river, a great empire will be destroyed". Believing the response favourable, Croesus attacked, but it was his own empire that ultimately was destroyed by the Persians.

She allegedly also proclaimed that there was no man wiser than Socrates, to which Socrates said that, if so, this was because he alone was aware of his own ignorance. After this confrontation, Socrates dedicated his life to a search for knowledge that was one of the founding events of Western philosophy. He claimed that she was "an essential guide to personal and state development." This oracle's last recorded response was given in 362 AD, to Julian the Apostate.

The oracle's powers were highly sought after and never doubted. Any inconsistencies between prophecies and events were dismissed as failure to correctly interpret the responses, not an error of the oracle. Very often prophecies were worded ambiguously, so as to cover all contingencies – especially so ex post facto. One famous such response to a query about participation in a military campaign was "You will go you will return never in war will you perish". This gives the recipient liberty to place a comma before or after the word "never", thus covering both possible outcomes. Another was the response to the Athenians when the vast army of king Xerxes I was approaching Athens with the intent of razing the city to the ground. "Only the wooden palisades may save you", answered the oracle, probably aware that there was sentiment for sailing to the safety of southern Italy and re-establishing Athens there. Some thought that it was a recommendation to fortify the Acropolis with a wooden fence and make a stand there. Others, Themistocles among them, said the oracle was clearly for fighting at sea, the metaphor intended to mean war ships. Others still insisted that their case was so hopeless that they should board every ship available and flee to Italy, where they would be safe beyond any doubt. In the event, variations of all three interpretations were attempted: some barricaded the Acropolis, the civilian population was evacuated over sea to nearby Salamis Island and to Troizen, and the war fleet fought victoriously at Salamis Bay. Should utter destruction have happened, it could always be claimed that the oracle had called for fleeing to Italy after all.

=== Sibyl at Cumae ===
Cumae was the first Greek colony on the mainland of Italy, near Naples, dating back to the 8th century BC. The sibylla or prophetess at Cumae became famous because of her proximity to Rome and the Sibylline Books acquired and consulted in emergencies by Rome wherein her prophecies were transcribed. The Cumaean Sibyl was called "Herophile" by Pausanias and Lactantius, "Deiphobe, daughter of Glaucus" by Virgil, as well as "Amaltheia", "Demophile", or "Taraxandra" by others. Sibyl's prophecies became popular with Christians as they were thought to predict the birth of Jesus Christ.

=== Oracle at Didyma ===
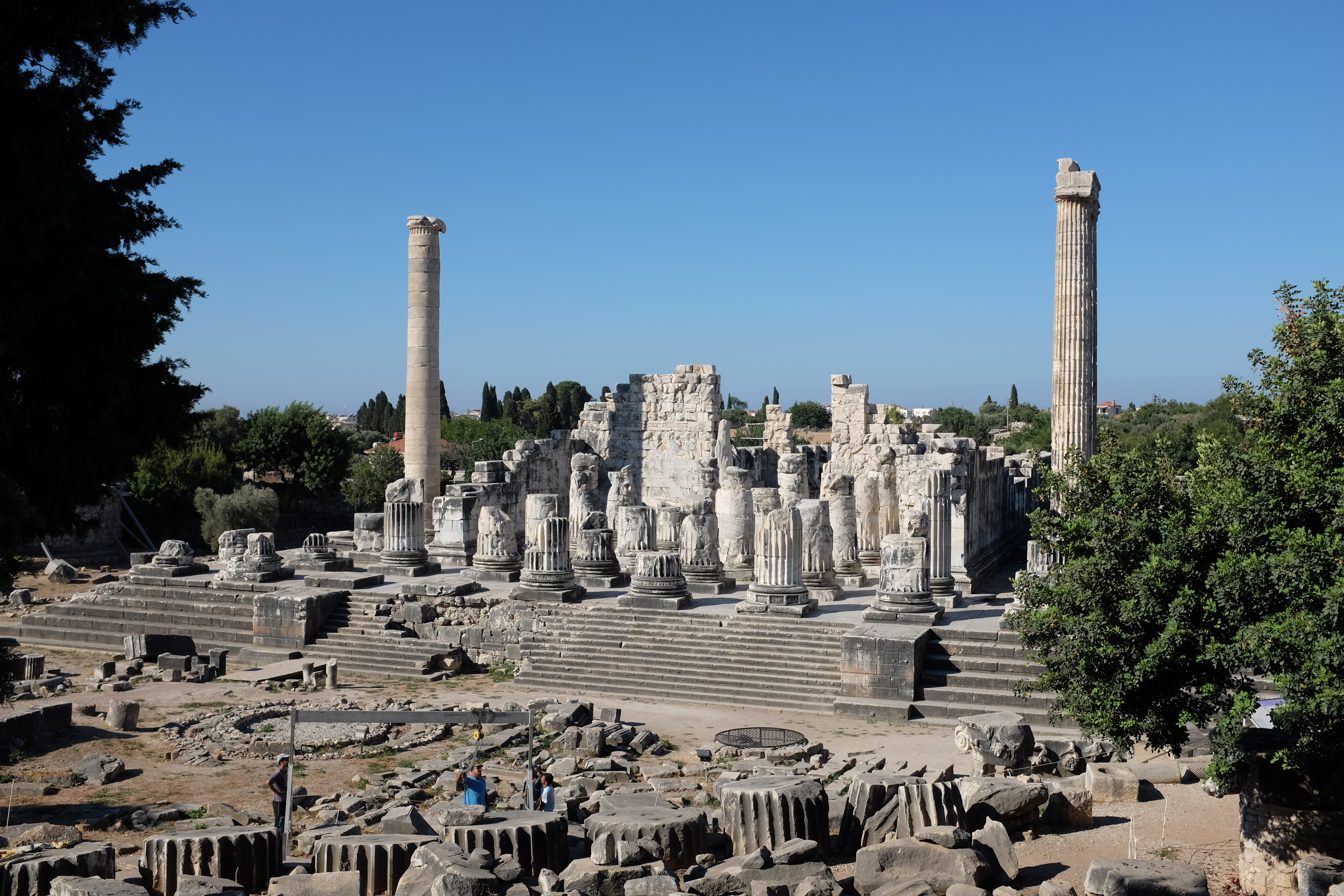
The ruins of the Temple of Apollo at Didyma

Didyma near Ionia in Asia Minor in the domain of the famous city of Miletus.

=== Oracle at Dodona ===
Dodona in northwestern Greece was another oracle devoted to the Mother Goddess identified at other sites with Rhea or Gaia, but here called Dione. The shrine of Dodona, set in a grove of oak trees, was the oldest Hellenic oracle, according to the fifth-century historian Herodotus, and dated from pre-Hellenic times, perhaps as early as the second millennium BC, when the tradition may have spread from Egypt. By the time of Herodotus, Zeus had displaced the Mother Goddess, who had been assimilated to Aphrodite, and the worship of the deified hero Heracles had been added. Dodona became the second most important oracle in ancient Greece, after Delphi. At Dodona, Zeus was worshipped as Zeus Naios or Naos (god of springs Naiads, from a spring under the oaks), or as Zeus Bouleos (chancellor). Priestesses and priests interpreted the rustling of the leaves of the oak tree that stood on this spot as Zeus' sanctuary to determine the correct actions to be taken.

=== Oracle at Abae ===
The oracle of Abae was one of the most important oracles. It was almost completely destroyed by the Persians during the Second Persian invasion of Greece.

=== Other oracles ===
Erythrae near Ionia in Asia Minor was home to a prophetess.

Trophonius was an oracle at Lebadea of Boeotia devoted to the chthonian Zeus Trophonius. Trophonius was a Greek hero nursed by Europa.

Near the Menestheus's port or Menesthei Portus (Greek: Μενεσθέως λιμήν), modern El Puerto de Santa María, Spain, was the oracle of Menestheus (Greek: Μαντεῖον τοῦ Μενεσθέως), to whom also the inhabitants of Gades offered sacrifices.

At the Ikaros island in the Persian Gulf (modern Failaka Island in Kuwait), there was an oracle of Artemis Tauropolus.

At Livadeia, there was the oracle of Trophonius.

The oracle of Zeus Ammon at the Siwa Oasis was visited by Greeks, and Pausanias records that the Lacedaemonians made greater use of it than any other Greek people in his time.

There was also another oracle of Zeus Ammon at Aphytis in Chalkidiki.

There was an oracle of Zeus at Olympia. It operated on the peak of the god's ash altar, a giant pile of ashes which had accumulated over time as a result of repeated sacrifice. Ulrich Sinn argues that the oracle existed as early as the eighth century BC. In the fifth century BC, Pindar treated the oracle as equally important to the ancient Olympic Games (which were held at the site).

In the city of Anariace (Ἀναριάκη) at the Caspian Sea, there was an oracle for sleepers. Persons should sleep in the temple in order to learn the divine will.

The oracle of Phrixus in Moschia, where a ram is never sacrificed, according to Strabo.

The oracle of Apollo Clarius at Claros, the oracle of Apollo at Eutresis, the oracle of Apollo at Tegyra, the oracle of Khresterios Apollo at Aigai (Aeolis), the oracle of Apollo at Chalcedon, the sanctuary of Apollo with an oracle at Gryneium, the oracle of Abae.

At Ptoion, there was an oracle of hero Ptoios and later of Apollo.

The oracle of the Acraean Hera located between Lechaion and Pagae.

Oracle of Aphrodite at Paphos.

There were many "oracles of the dead", such as in Argolis, Cumae, Herakleia in Pontos, in the Temple of Poseidon in Taenaron, but the most important was the Necromanteion of Acheron.

The scholia to Lycophron's Alexandra preserve a reference to Aristotle's now lost Constitution of the Ithacans, noting that there was an oracle of Odysseus among the Aetolian Eurytanes.

== In other cultures ==
The term "oracle" is also applied in modern English to parallel institutions of divination in other cultures. Specifically, it is used in the context of Christianity for the concept of divine revelation, and in the context of Judaism for the Urim and Thummim breastplate, and in general any utterance considered prophetic.

=== Caucasus ===
According to Strabo, the city of Anariace (Ἀναριάκη), which belonged to a people known as the Anariacae in the Caucasus, contained an oracle that revealed the will of the gods to those who slept within its temple.

=== Celtic polytheism ===
In Celtic polytheism, divination was performed by the priestly caste, either the druids or the vates. This is reflected in the role of "seers" in Dark Age Wales (dryw) and Ireland (fáith).

=== China ===
Oracle bone of the Shang dynasty, ancient China

In China, oracle bones were used for divination in the late Shang dynasty (c. 1600–1046 BC). Diviners applied heat to these bones, usually ox scapulae or tortoise plastrons, and interpreted the resulting cracks.

A different divining method, using the stalks of the yarrow plant, was practiced in the subsequent Zhou dynasty (1046–256 BC). Around the late 9th century BC, the divination system was recorded in the I Ching, or "Book of Changes", a collection of linear signs used as oracles. In addition to its oracular power, the I Ching has had a major influence on the philosophy, literature and statecraft of China since the Zhou period.

=== Egypt ===
According to the Ancient Egyptian religion, some ancient Egyptian gods (and rarely deified humans), acted as intermediaries between humans and the divine. This was exemplified by the Ancient Egyptian title "Reporter/Herald" (wḥmw), whom in the religious context, reports requests and petitions to the local gods.

Herodotus says that Egyptians believed divination was controlled by the gods rather than practiced freely by humans. Egypt had many oracles, each dedicated to a specific god (including oracles of Heracles, Apollo, Athena, Artemis, Ares and Zeus), with the Oracle of Leto at Buto held in the highest honor. He also notes that there was no single, uniform method of divination; instead, practices varied from place to place.

=== Hawaii ===
In Hawaii, oracles were found at certain heiau, Hawaiian temples. These oracles were found in towers covered in white kapa cloth made from plant fibres. In here, priests received the will of gods. These towers were called 'Anu'u. An example of this can be found at Ahu'ena heiau in Kona.

=== India and Nepal ===
In ancient India, the oracle was known as ākāśavānī ("voice/speech from the sky/aether") or aśarīravānī ("a disembodied voice (or voice of the unseen)") (asariri in Tamil), and was related to the message of a god. Oracles played key roles in many of the major incidents of the epics Mahabharata and Ramayana. An example is that Kamsa (or Kansa), the evil uncle of Krishna, was informed by an oracle that the eighth son of his sister Devaki would kill him. The opening verse of the Tiruvalluva Maalai, a medieval Tamil anthology usually dated by modern scholars to between c. 7th and 10th centuries CE, is attributed to an asariri or oracle. However, there are no references in any Indian literature of the oracle being a specific person.

Contemporarily, Theyyam or "theiyam" in Malayalam - a south Indian language - the process by which a Priest invites a Hindu god or goddess to use his or her body as a medium or channel and answer other devotees' questions, still happens. The same is called "arulvaakku" or "arulvaak" in Tamil, another south Indian language - Adhiparasakthi Siddhar Peetam is famous for arulvakku in Tamil Nadu. The people in and around Mangalore in Karnataka call the same, Buta Kola, "paathri" or "darshin"; in other parts of Karnataka, it is known by various names such as, "prashnaavali", "vaagdaana", "asei", "aashirvachana" and so on. In Nepal it is known as, "Devta ka dhaamee" or "jhaakri".

=== Nigeria ===
The Igbo people of southeastern Nigeria in Africa have a long tradition of using oracles. In Igbo villages, oracles were usually female priestesses to a particular deity, usually dwelling in a cave or other secluded location away from urban areas, and, much as the oracles of ancient Greece, would deliver prophecies in an ecstatic state to visitors seeking advice. Two of their ancient oracles became especially famous during the pre-colonial period: the Agbala oracle at Awka and the Chukwu oracle at Arochukwu. Although the vast majority of Igbos today are Christian, many of them still use oracles.

Among the related Yoruba peoples of the same country, the Babalawos (and their female counterparts, the Iyanifas) serve collectively as the principal aspects of the tribe's world-famous Ifa divination system. Due to this, they customarily officiate at a great many of its traditional and religious ceremonies.

=== Norse mythology ===
In Norse mythology, Odin took the severed head of the god Mimir to Asgard for consultation as an oracle. The Havamal and other sources relate the sacrifice of Odin for the oracular runes whereby he lost an eye (external sight) and won wisdom (internal sight; insight).

=== Pre-Columbian Americas ===
In the migration myth of the Mexitin, i.e., the early Aztecs, a mummy-bundle (perhaps an effigy) carried by four priests directed the trek away from the cave of origins by giving oracles. An oracle led to the foundation of Mexico-Tenochtitlan. The Yucatec Mayas knew oracle priests or chilanes, literally 'mouthpieces' of the deity. Their written repositories of traditional knowledge, the Books of Chilam Balam, were all ascribed to one famous oracle priest who had correctly predicted the coming of the Spaniards and its associated disasters.

=== Tibet ===
In Tibet, oracles (Tib. སྐུ་རྟེན་, ku ten, Wyl. sku rten) have played, and continue to play, an important part in religion and government. The word "oracle" is used by Tibetans to refer to the spirit that enters those men and women who act as mediums between the natural and the spiritual realms. The media are, therefore, known as kuten, which literally means, "the physical basis".

The Dalai Lama, who lives in exile in northern India, still consults an oracle known as the Nechung Oracle, which is considered the official state oracle of the government of Tibet. The Dalai Lama has, according to centuries-old custom, consulted the Nechung Oracle during the new year festivities of Losar. Nechung and Gadhong are the primary oracles currently consulted; former oracles such as Karmashar and Darpoling are no longer active in exile. The Gadhong oracle has died leaving Nechung to be the only primary oracle. Another oracle the Dalai Lama consults is the Tenma Oracle, for which a young Tibetan woman by the name of Khandro La is the medium for the mountain goddesses Tseringma along with the other 11 goddesses. The Dalai Lama gives a complete description of the process of trance and spirit possession in his book Freedom in Exile.

== See also ==
- Fuji (planchette writing)
- Futomani
- I Ching
- Jiaobei
- Kau Cim
- Lên đồng
- Lingqijing
- Mudang
- Poe divination
- Tangki
- Tung Shing

== Sources ==
- Barringer, Judith M., "Zeus at Olympia", in The Gods of Ancient Greece: Identities and Transformations, pp. 155–177, edited by Jan N. Bremmer and Andrew Erskine, Edinburgh, Edinburgh University Press, 2010. ISBN 978-0-7486-3798-0.
- Barringer, Judith M., Olympia: A Cultural History, Princeton and Oxford, Princeton University Press, 2021. ISBN 978-0-691-21047-6.
- Broad, William J. (2007). The Oracle: Ancient Delphi and the Science Behind Its Lost Secrets. New York: Penguin Press.
- Yavis, Constantine G., Greek Altars: Origins and Typology, Saint Louis, Saint Louis University Press, 1949. OCLC 625204.
