= Gyaca, Tibet =

Gyaca རྒྱ་ཚ་
- Location within Tibet
- Coordinates: 29°8′35″N 92°35′31″E
- Country: China
- Region: Tibet
- Prefecture: Shannan Prefecture
- County: Gyaca County

Population
  - Total
  - Major Nationalities: Tibetan
  - Regional dialect: Tibetan language
- Time zone: +8

Gyaca (རྒྱ་ཚ་), also known as Drumpa, is a township in the Tibet Autonomous Region of China, approximately 155 kilometres (96 mi) from Lhasa. It is the seat of Gyaca County in the Shannan Prefecture and lies on a bend in the Brahmaputra River. It contains the Dakpo Tratsang Monastery and government offices for Gyaca County.

== See also ==
- List of towns and villages in Tibet
