= Mo (divination) =

Form of Tibetian divination

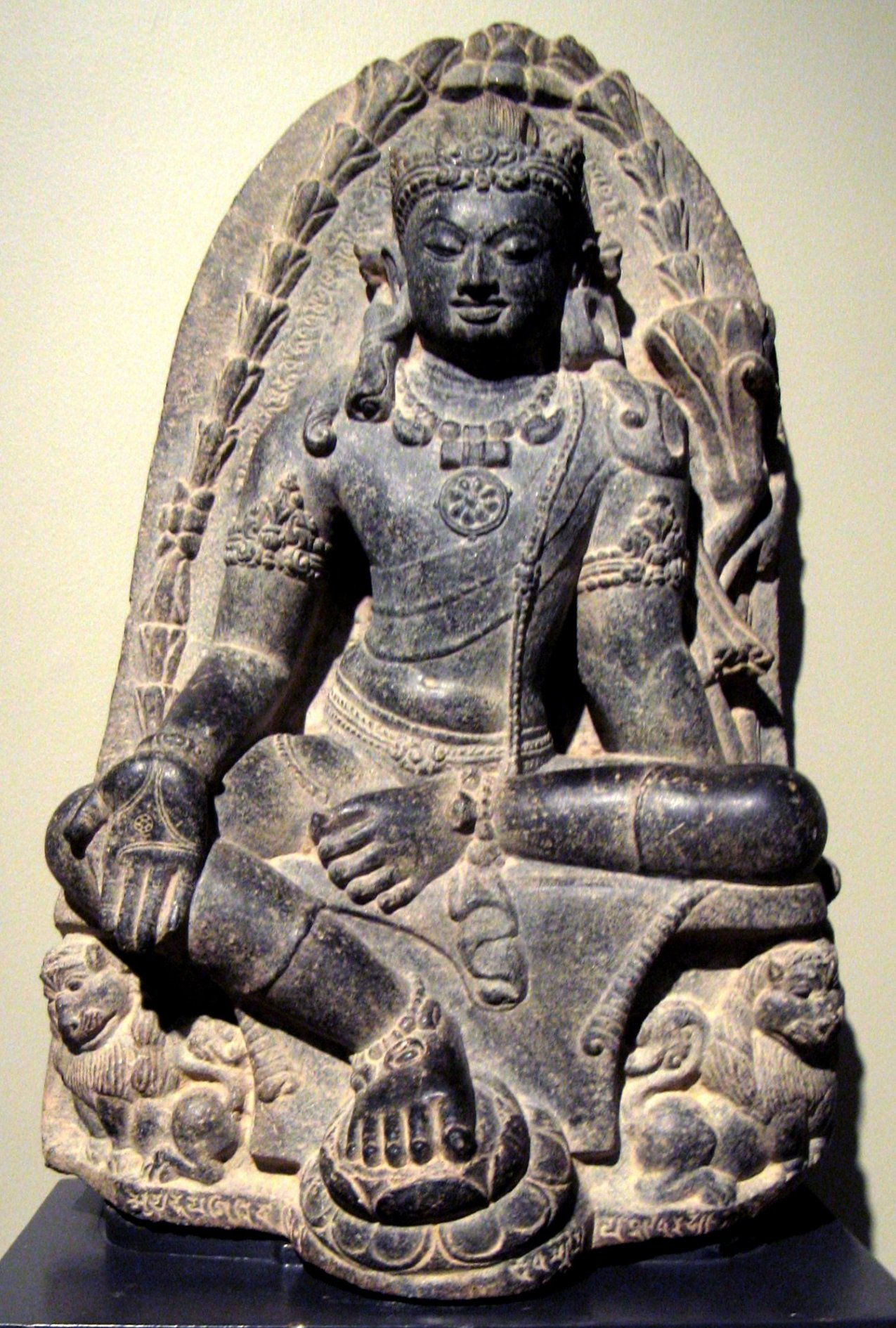
Manjusri, the bodhisattva said to influence the dice during divination.

Mo (Tibetan: མོ་, Wylie: mo), is a form of divination that is part of the culture and religion of Tibet. The Tibetan people consult Mo when making important decisions about health, work or travel. Mo employs dice and there are books written by various lamas on interpretations for the casting of dice. The answers given by the Mo are regarded as coming from Manjushri, the Bodhisattva of wisdom. Mo is considered to represent a blend of Tibetan shaman traditions and Buddhist beliefs.

One Mo prediction manual was composed by Jamgon Ju Mipham Gyatso, a great scholar and saint of the Nyingmapa tradition of Tibetan Buddhism. This Mo prediction manual is based primarily upon the Kalachakra Tantra and supplementary explanations from the 'Ocean of Dakinis'. To use this Mo divination, one must have a question in mind and roll the dice. The dice's outcome will indicate an answer in the prediction manual. The answer in the manual should answer your question, but may need some interpretation.

The Dalai Lama consults the Mo divination when making important decisions.

== See also ==
- Nechung Oracle
- Irk Bitig
