= 1st Dalai Lama =

Spiritual leader of Tibet from 1391 to 1474

1st Dalai Lama, Gedun Drupa
- ཏཱ་ལའི་བླ་མ་སྐུ་ཕྲེང་དང་པོ།, ཀེ་ཏུན་ཏེ་ལུའུ་པ།
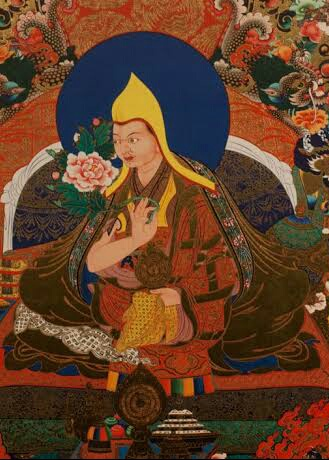
- དགེ་འདུན་གྲུབ་པ།
- Title: 1st Dalai Lama (posthumous designation)

Personal life
- Born: Péma Dorjee; 1391 Shabtod, Ü-Tsang, Tibet
- Died: 1474 (aged 82–83) Ü-Tsang, Tibet
- Parents: Gonpo Dorjee (father); Jomo Namkha Kyi (mother)

Religious life
- Religion: Tibetan Buddhism

Senior posting
- Successor: Gedun Gyatso

Chinese name
- Chinese: 根敦朱巴
Transcriptions
Standard Mandarin
- Hanyu Pinyin: gēndūn zhūbā

Tibetan name
- Tibetan: དགེ་འདུན་གྲུབ་པ
Transcriptions
- Wylie: dge 'dun grub pa

Original name: Péma Dorjee

Chinese name
- Chinese: 巴玛多杰
Transcriptions
Standard Mandarin
- Hanyu Pinyin: bāmǎ duōjié

Tibetan name
- Tibetan: པད་མ་རྡོ་རྗེ་
Transcriptions
- Wylie: pad ma rdo rje

The 1st Dalai Lama, Gedun Drupa (Tibetan: དགེ་འདུན་གྲུབ་པ།, Wylie: dge 'dun grub pa) (1391–1474) was a student of Je Tsongkhapa, and became his first Khenpo (Abbott) at Ganden Monastery. He also founded Tashi Lhunpo Monastery in Shigatse. He was posthumously awarded the spiritual title of Dalai Lama.

== Biography ==
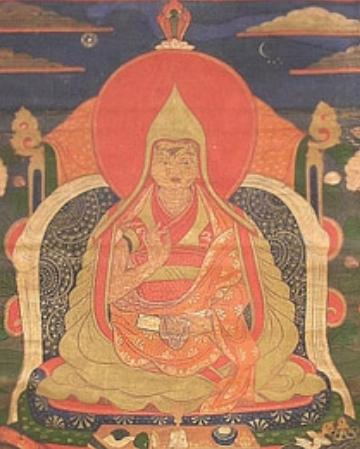
Gedun Drupa, 1st Dalai Lama

Gedun Drupa was born in a cow-shed in Gyurmey Rupa near Sakya in the Tsang region of central Tibet, the son of Gonpo Dorjee and Jomo Namkha Kyi, nomadic tribespeople. He was raised as a shepherd until the age of seven. His birth name (according to the Tibetan Buddhist Resource Center, his personal name) was Péma Dorjee (Tibetan: པད་མ་རྡོ་རྗེ་, "Vajra Lotus").

=== Ordination ===
Later he was placed in Narthang Monastery. In 1405, he took his getsul (novitiate) vows from the abbot of Narthang, Khenchen Drupa Sherap. When he was 20 years old, in about 1411, he received the name Gedun Drupa upon taking the vows of a bhikṣu (monk) from the abbot of Narthang Monastery. Also at this age he became a student of the scholar and reformer Je Tsongkhapa (1357–1419), who some say was his uncle. Around this time he also became the first abbot of Ganden Monastery, founded by Tsongkhapa himself in 1409.

=== Career ===
By the middle of his life, Gedun Drupa had become one of the most esteemed scholar-saints in the country. Gedun Drupa founded the major monastery of Tashi Lhunpo Monastery at Shigatse, which later became the seat of the Panchen Lamas.

Gedun Drupa did not hold national political power. It was in the hands of viceroys such as the Sakyas, the prince of Tsang, and the Mongolian Khagan. The Tibetan national political leadership positions of the successive Dalai Lamas began much later during the reign of the 5th Dalai Lama, in 1642.

He remained the Khenpo of Tashi Lhunpo Monastery until he died while meditating in 1474 at the age of 84 (83 by Western reckoning).

== Legends ==
Tradition states that Palden Lhamo, the female guardian spirit of the sacred lake, Lhamo Latso, promised the First Dalai Lama in one of her visions "...that she would protect the reincarnation lineage of the Dalai Lamas." Since the time of Gedun Gyatso, who formalized the system, monks have gone to the lake to meditate when seeking visions with guidance on finding the next reincarnation.

== Notable contemporaries ==
The Samding Dorje Phagmo (1422–1455), the highest female incarnation in Tibet, was a contemporary of Gedun Drupa. Her teacher, the Bodongpa Panchen Chogley Namgyal was also one of his teachers; he received many teachings and empowerments from him.

== Works ==
Some of the most famous texts Gedun Drupa wrote were:

- Sunlight on the Path to Freedom, a commentary on Abhidharma-kosa
- Crushing the Forces of Evil to Dust, an epic poem on the life and liberating deeds of Gautama Buddha
- Song of the Eastern Snow Mountain, a poem dedicated to Je Tsongkhapa
- Praise of the Venerable Lady Khadiravani Tara, an homage to Tara

Buddhist titles
Preceded by New creation	Dalai Lama; N/A; Posthumously recognized	Succeeded by Gedun Gyatso
