= Gyaca County =

Gyaca County 加查县 • རྒྱ་ཚ་རྫོང་།
- County
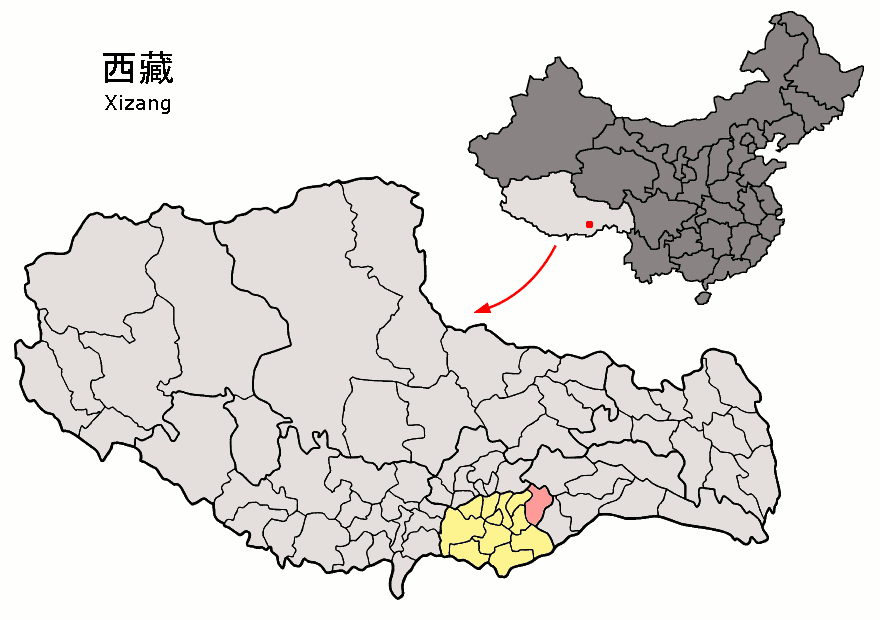
- Location of Gyaca County (red) within Shannan City (yellow) and the Tibet A.R.

- Location of the seat in the Tibet A.R. Gyaca (China)
- Coordinates: 29°8′35″N 92°35′31″E
- Country: China
- Autonomous region: Tibet
- Prefecture-level city: Shannan (Lhoka)
- County seat: Gyaca

Area
  - Total: 4,388.26 km^{2} (1,694.32 sq mi)

Population (2020)
  - Total: 23,534
  - Density: 5.3629/km^{2} (13.890/sq mi)
- Time zone: UTC+8 (China Standard)
- Website: www.jiacha.gov.cn

Gyaca County

Chinese name
- Simplified Chinese: 加查县
- Traditional Chinese: 加查縣
Transcriptions
Standard Mandarin
- Hanyu Pinyin: Jiāchá Xiàn

Tibetan name
- Tibetan: རྒྱ་ཚ་རྫོང་།
Transcriptions
- Wylie: rgya tsha rdzong
- Tibetan Pinyin: Gyaca Zong

Gyaca County (Tibetan: རྒྱ་ཚ་རྫོང་།; Chinese: 加查县) is a county of Shannan located in the south-east of the Tibet Autonomous Region, China.

Gyatsa County is in the south of Tibet, stretching from the Podrang La pass along the southern side of the Brahmaputra River downstream to Pamda which is just to the southwest of Daklha Gampo, across the Brahmaputra. The county capital is in the town of Gyaca or Drumpa (46 km or 29 mi west of Pamda) which is alongside the Drakpo Dratsang Monastery. It is renowned for its walnuts and apricots.

Lhamo La-tso is the name of a small oval lake in the area. It is also called "Oracle Lake", as it is where senior Tibetan monks go for visions to assist in the discovery of reincarnations of the Dalai Lamas is located in Gyaca County.

== Administrative divisions ==
Gyaca County contains 2 towns and 5 townships.

Name	Chinese	Hanyu Pinyin	Tibetan	Wylie
Towns
Gyaca Town	加查镇	Jiāchá zhèn	རྒྱ་ཚ་གྲོང་རྡལ།	rgya tsha grong rdal
Ngarrab Town	安绕镇	Ānrào zhèn	མངར་རབ་གྲོང་རྡལ།	mngar rab grong rdal
Townships
Lhasöl Township	拉绥乡	Lāsuí xiāng	ལྷ་གསོལ་ཤང་།	lha gsol shang
Chêju Township	崔久乡	Cuījiǔ xiāng	ཆེས་བཅུ་ཤང་།	ches bcu shang
Ba Township	坝乡	Bà xiāng	སྦྲ་ཤང་།	sbra shang
Lingda Township	冷达乡	Lěngdá xiāng	གླིང་མདའ་ཤང་།	gling mda' shang
Lholing Township	洛林乡	Luòlín xiāng	ལྷོ་གླིང་ཤང་།	lho gling shang

== Climate ==
Climate data for Gyaca, elevation 3,260 m (10,700 ft), (1991–2020 normals)
Month	Jan	Feb	Mar	Apr	May	Jun	Jul	Aug	Sep	Oct	Nov	Dec	Year
Mean daily maximum °C (°F)	10.9 (51.6)	13.3 (55.9)	16.1 (61.0)	18.9 (66.0)	22.1 (71.8)	25.1 (77.2)	24.6 (76.3)	24.0 (75.2)	22.9 (73.2)	20.2 (68.4)	16.1 (61.0)	12.1 (53.8)	18.9 (66.0)
Daily mean °C (°F)	0.5 (32.9)	3.5 (38.3)	7.0 (44.6)	10.1 (50.2)	13.6 (56.5)	16.7 (62.1)	16.9 (62.4)	16.4 (61.5)	14.9 (58.8)	10.7 (51.3)	5.1 (41.2)	1.0 (33.8)	9.7 (49.5)
Mean daily minimum °C (°F)	−7.9 (17.8)	−5.1 (22.8)	−0.9 (30.4)	3.0 (37.4)	7.1 (44.8)	11.2 (52.2)	12.3 (54.1)	11.8 (53.2)	10.1 (50.2)	3.8 (38.8)	−2.8 (27.0)	−7.0 (19.4)	3.0 (37.3)
Average precipitation mm (inches)	1.2 (0.05)	2.4 (0.09)	10.4 (0.41)	24.0 (0.94)	44.3 (1.74)	84.8 (3.34)	149.6 (5.89)	124.2 (4.89)	66.9 (2.63)	13.5 (0.53)	2.7 (0.11)	0.4 (0.02)	524.4 (20.64)
Average precipitation days (≥ 0.1 mm)	1.1	1.9	5.5	10.1	14.3	19.8	23.8	22.1	18.2	5.0	1.6	0.3	123.7
Average snowy days	2.1	3.6	6.9	2.2	0.2	0	0	0	0	0.3	1.4	1.1	17.8
Average relative humidity (%)	32	33	39	46	52	60	69	69	67	53	40	36	50
Mean monthly sunshine hours	234.2	223.1	234.2	225.5	226.5	200.5	182.2	190.1	197.2	245.6	245.6	233.3	2,638
Percentage possible sunshine	72	70	63	58	54	48	43	47	54	70	77	73	61
Source: China Meteorological Administration
