= 2nd Dalai Lama =

Spiritual leader of Tibet from 1486 to 1542

2nd Dalai Lama, Gedun Gyatso
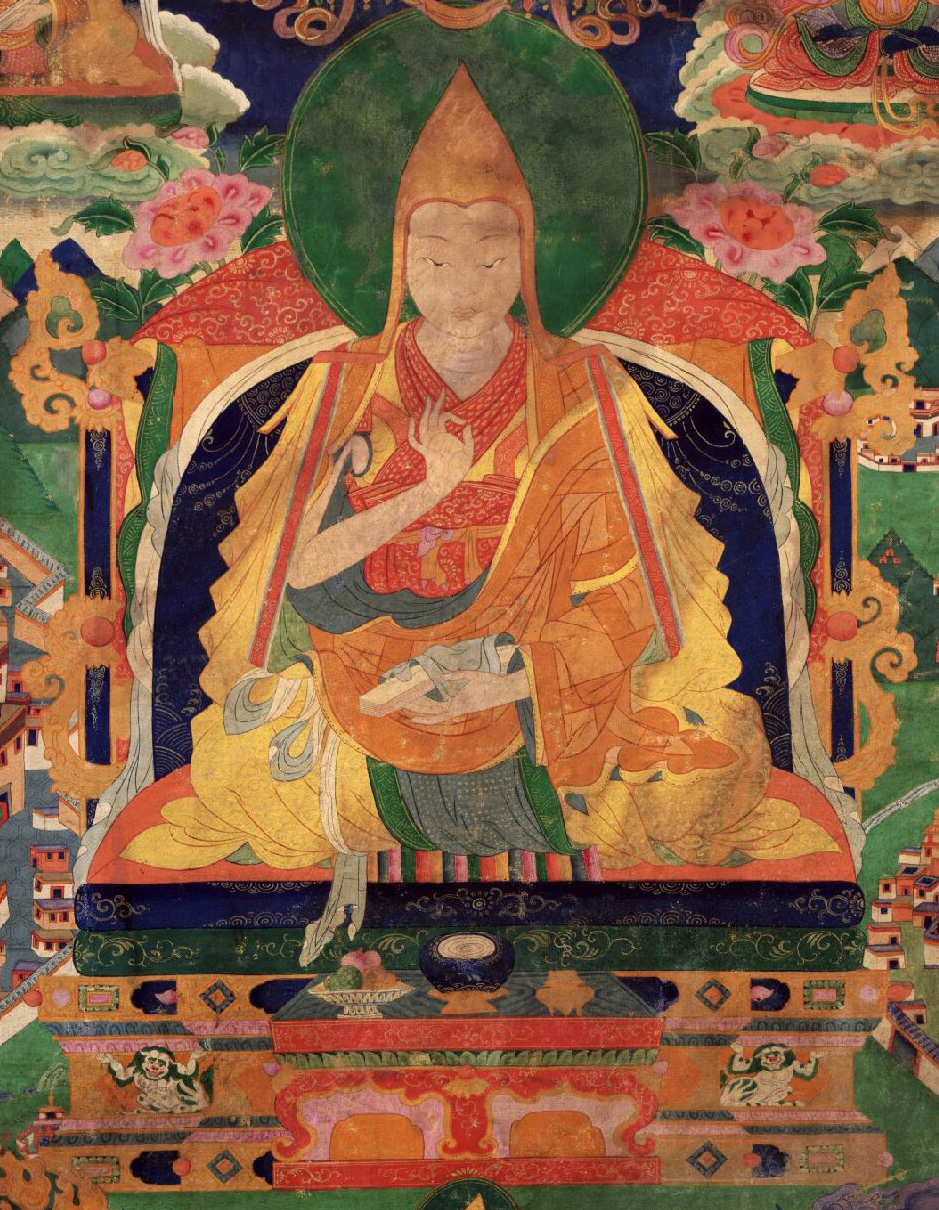
- Title: 2nd Dalai Lama (posthumous designation)

Personal life
- Born: Sangye Phel; 1475 Tanag Segme, Ü-Tsang, Tibet
- Died: 1542 (aged 66–67) Tibet
- Parents: Kunga Gyaltso (father); Machik Kunga Pemo (mother)

Religious life
- Religion: Tibetan Buddhism

Senior posting
- Predecessor: Gedun Drupa
- Successor: Sonam Gyatso

Chinese name
- Chinese: 根敦嘉措
Transcriptions
Standard Mandarin
- Hanyu Pinyin: gēn dūn jiā cuò

Tibetan name
- Tibetan: དགེ་འདུན་རྒྱ་མཚོ།
Transcriptions
- Wylie: dge-'dun rgya-mtsho

The 2nd Dalai Lama, Gedun Gyatso (Tibetan: དགེ་འདུན་རྒྱ་མཚོ།, Wylie: dge-'dun rgya-mtsho, "Sublimely Glorious Ocean of Spiritual Aspirants") (1475–1542) was also known as Yonten Phuntsok, or Gedun Gyatso Palzangpo. He was ordained at Tashilhunpo Monastery at Shigatse, and later resided at Drepung Monastery in Lhasa. He was posthumously entitled as the 2nd Dalai Lama.

== Early life ==
Gedun Gyatso was born as Sangye Phel (Tibetan: སངས་རྒྱས་འཕེལ, Wylie: sangs rgyas 'phel) at Shigatse near Tanak, in the Tsang region of central Tibet. His father, Kunga Gyaltsen (1432–1481) (Tibetan: ཀུན་དགའ་རྒྱལ་མཚན།, Wylie: kun dga' rgyal mtshan), was a vow-holding Ngakpa of the Nyingma lineage and a famous Nyingma tantric master. His father and mother, Machik Kunga Pemo (Tibetan: མ་གཅིག་ཀུན་དགའ་དཔལ་མོ, Wylie: ma gcig kun dga' dpal mo), were married and farmed as a family. According to scholar Gene Smith, "the rebirth of the First Dalai Lama as the son of Drubchen Kunga Gyaltsen resulted in the end of a hereditary line of Sangpa Kagyupa lamas."

While he was a young boy, he was proclaimed to be the reincarnation of Gendun Drupa, and sources say this occurred when he was either four years of age, or eight years of age.

Soon after he learned to speak, he reportedly told his parents his name was Pema Dorje, the birth name of Gendun Drupa (1391–1474) and that his father was Lobsang Drakpa, which was Je Tsongkhapa's ordination name. When he was four, he reportedly told his parents he wished to live in the Tashilhunpo monastery, which is next to Shigatse and founded in 1447 by Gendun Drupa, in order to be with his monks.

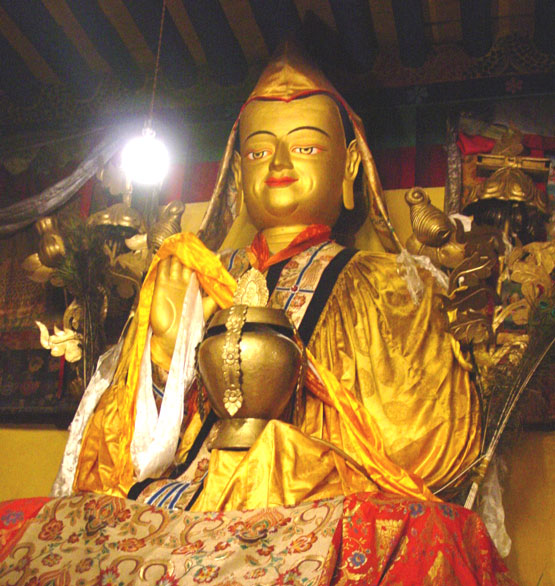
Statue of Lobsang Gyatso

He received his getsul novice vows from Panchen Lungrig Gyatso in 1486 at the age of ten, and his full bhikshu ordination vows from Ghoje Choekyi Gyaltsen, who gave him the ordination name of Gedun Gyatso. At the age of eleven, he was enthroned as the reincarnation of Gendun Drupa at Tashilhunpo monastery.

He remained at Tashilhunpo until he was 16 or 17, but due to "some controversies or jealousy", he had to leave the monastery and then went to Lhasa to study at Drepung Monastery.

== Buddhist influence ==
Gedun Gyatso was a renowned scholar and composer of mystical poetry, who traveled widely to extend Gelugpa influence, and became abbot of the largest Gelugpa monastery, Drepung, which from this time on was closely associated with the reincarnation line which eventually would be known as that of the Dalai Lamas. According to Sumpa Khenpo, the great Gelug scholar, he also studied some Nyingma-pa tantric doctrines.

It is said that Palden Lhamo, the female guardian spirit of the sacred lake, Lhamo Latso, promised the First Dalai Lama in one of his visions "that she would protect the reincarnation lineage of the Dalai Lamas." Since the time of Gendun Gyatso, who formalised the system, monks have gone to the lake to seek guidance on choosing the next reincarnation through visions while meditating there. Gendun Gyatso is said to have been the first to discover the sacredness of Lake Lhamo Latso.

In 1509 he went to southern Tibet and founded the monastery of Chokorgyel Monastery (Chokhor-gyal) close to lake Lhamo Latso, about 115 km northeast of Tsetang and at an altitude of 4,500 m (14,764 ft), while the lake itself is at an altitude of about 5,000 m. (16,404 ft).

Gedun Gyatso became abbot of Tashilhunpo in 1512 at the age of thirty-six. In 1517 he became abbot of Drepung monastery and he revived the 'Great Prayer Festival' or Monlam Chenmo in 1518, presiding over the celebration with monks from the three large Gelug monasteries of Sera, Drepung and Gaden (Ganden was the original monastery of the Geluk order, founded by Je Tsongkhapa himself in 1409). He then became abbot of Sera monastery in 1525; Sera had been founded in 1419, by Jamchen Chojey (Sakya Yeshe), a disciple of Tsong Khapa.

His Seat has been Drepung.

Gedun Gyatso died deep in meditation at the age of 67 in 1542.

== Bibliography ==
- Essence of Refined Gold by the Third Dalai Lama: with related texts by the Second and Seventh Dalai Lamas. (1978) Translated by Glenn H. Mullin. Tushita Books, Dharamsala, H.P., India.
- Mullin, Glenn H. (2001). The Fourteen Dalai Lamas: A Sacred Legacy of Reincarnation, pp. 86–129. Clear Light Publishers. Santa Fe, New Mexico. ISBN 1-57416-092-3.
- Mullin, Glenn H. (2005). Second Dalai Lama His Life and Teachings, Snow Lion Publications, ISBN 9781559392334
- 2nd Dalai Lama. Tantric Yogas of Sister Niguma, Snow Lion Publications, 1st ed. U. edition (May 1985), ISBN 978-0-937938-28-7

Buddhist titles
Preceded by Gedun Drupa	Dalai Lama; N/A; Posthumously recognized	Succeeded by Sonam Gyatso
