= List of Panchen Lamas =

This is a list of Panchen Lamas of Tibet. There are currently 10 recognised incarnations of the Panchen Lama; the 11th Panchen Lama, however, is disputed.

== List ==
Title	Portrait	Name (Lifespan)	Recognition	Tibetan Wylie transliteration	THL and other transliterations	References
1st Panchen Lama		Khedrup Gelek Pelzang (1385–1438)	posthumously	མཁས་གྲུབ་རྗེ། mkhas grub rje,་ མཁས་གྲུབ་དགེ་ལེགས་དཔལ་བཟང་པོ། mkhas grub dge legs dpal bzang po	Khédrup Gélek Pelzangpo; Khädrup Je; Khedrup Gelek Pelsang; Kedrup Geleg Pelzang; Khedup Gelek Palsang; Khedrup Gelek Pal Sangpo	
2nd Panchen Lama		Sönam Choklang (1438–1505)	posthumously	བསོད་ནམས་ཕྱོགས་ཀྱི་གླང་པོ། bsod nams phyogs glang,་ བསོད་ནམས་ཕྱོགས་ཀྱི་གླང་པོ་ bsod nams phyogs kyi glang po	Sönam Chok kyi Langpo; Sonam Choglang; Soenam Choklang	
3rd Panchen Lama		Ensapa Lobsang Döndrup (1505–1568)	posthumously	དབེན་ས་པ་བློ་བཟང་དོན་གྲུབ། dben sa pa blo bzang don grub	Wensapa Lozang Döndrup; Gyalwa Ensapa; Ensapa Lozang Döndrup; Ensapa Losang Dhodrub	
4th Panchen Lama		Lobsang Chökyi Gyalsten (1570–1662)	1645–1662	བློ་བཟང་ཆོས་ཀྱི་རྒྱལ་མཚན། blo bzang chos kyi rgyal mtshan	Lozang Chö kyi Gyeltsen; Losang Chökyi Gyältsän; Lozang Chökyi Gyeltsen; Lobsang Chökyi Gyaltsen; Lobsang Choekyi Gyaltsen; Lobsang Choegyal; Losang Chögyan	
5th Panchen Lama		Lobsang Yeshe (1663–1737)	1663–1737	བློ་བཟང་ཡེ་ཤེས། blo bzang ye shes	Lozang Yéshé; Lobsang Yeshi; Losang Yeshe	
6th Panchen Lama		Lobsang Palden Yeshe (1738–1780)	1738–1780	བློ་བཟང་དཔལ་ལྡན་ཡེ་ཤེས། blo bzang dpal ldan ye shes	Lozang Penden Yéshé; Palden Yeshe; Palden Yeshi	
7th Panchen Lama		Palden Tenpai Nyima (1782–1853)	1782–1853	དཔལ་ལྡན་བསྟན་པའི་ཉི་མ། pal ldan bstan pa'i nyi ma	Penden Tenpé Nyima; Tänpä Nyima; Tenpé Nyima; Tempai Nyima; Tenpey Nyima	
8th Panchen Lama		Tenpai Wangchuk (1855–1882)	1857–1882	བསྟན་པའི་དབང་ཕྱུག bstan pa'i dbang phyug	Tenpé Wangchuk; Tänpä Wangchug; Tenpé Wangchuk; Tempai Wangchuk; Tenpey Wangchuk	
9th Panchen Lama		Thupten Chökyi Nyima (1883–1937)	1888–1937	ཐུབ་བསྟན་ཆོས་ཀྱི་ཉི་མ། thub bstan chos kyi nyi ma	Tupten Chö kyi Nyima; Choekyi Nyima; Thubtän Chökyi Nyima	
10th Panchen Lama		Choekyi Gyaltsen (1938–1989)	1938–1989	བློ་བཟང་ཕྲིན་ལས་ལྷུན་གྲུབ་ ཆོས་ཀྱི་རྒྱལ་མཚན། blo bzang phrin las lhun grub chos kyi rgyal mtshan	Lozang Trinlé Lhündrup Chö kyi Gyeltsen; Choekyi Gyaltsen; Chökyi Gyeltsen; Choekyi Gyaltse; Trinley Choekyi Gyaltsen; Lozang Trinlä Lhündrup Chökyi Gyältsän	

== 11th Panchen Lama schism ==
After the death of the 10th Panchen Lama, his succession came to be disputed between the exiled 14th Dalai Lama and the government of the People's Republic of China. This resulted in a schism between two competing candidates who are both claimed to be the 11th Panchen Lama.

Name (Lifespan)	Portrait	Recognition	Tibetan Wylie transliteration	THL and other transliterations	Notes	References
Gedhun Choekyi Nyima (born 1989)		14 May 1995 – present	དགེ་འདུན་ཆོས་ཀྱི་ཉི་མ dGe 'dun Chos kyi nyi ma	Gedhun Choekyi Nyima	Claim supported by the 14th Dalai Lama and the Central Tibetan Administration.	
Gyaincain Norbu (born 1990)		8 December 1995 – present	ཆོས་ཀྱི་རྒྱལ་པོ། chos kyi rgyal po	Chö kyi Gyelpo; Choekyi Gyalpo; Chökyi Gyälbo; Gyaltsen Norbu; Qoigyijabu	Claim supported by the People's Republic of China.	

== See also ==
- List of Dalai Lamas
- List of rulers of Tibet
