= Gada Meiren =

Mongol leader (1892-1931)

- Mongolian: ᠭᠠᠳᠠ ᠮᠡᠶ᠋ᠢᠷᠡᠨ
- Born: 1892; Horqin Left Middle Banner, Qing China
- Died: 1931 (aged 38–39)

Gada Meiren (Mongolian: ᠭᠠᠳᠠ
ᠮᠡᠶ᠋ᠢᠷᠡᠨ ɣada meyiren, Гаадаа мэйрэн, simplified Chinese: 嘎达梅林; traditional Chinese: 嘎達梅林; pinyin: Gādá Méilín, 1892 - April 5, 1931) was the Mongol leader of a struggle and, eventually, an uprising against the sale of the Khorchin grasslands (in what is now Tongliao City of Inner Mongolia) to Han settlers in 1929.

== Family ==
Gada Meiren was born in a village named jam-un tokhui in Khorchin Left Wing Middle Banner (commonly called Darkhan Banner), Jirim League, Qing China. Gada Meiren was a nickname. His given name was Nadmid and he belonged to the Mültütü clan. He also had a Chinese name Meng Qingshan (孟青山). As he was the last son of a family, he was always called lou ɣada (youngest son). Meiren was a loan word from Manchu and referred to a military officer.

As Jirim League was close to China proper, it was subjected to an enormous population pressure from the Chinese heartland. Han immigrants came under the administration of Chinese counties, and the Mongol banner quickly shrunk. His family originally lived in a grassland controlled by Prince Öndür. Although not from aristocracy, his ancestors successfully became land owners when overpopulation forced the Mongols to shift from animal husbandry to farming. When Gada Meiren was 10 years old, the banner's deputy head Jigdenvangkhur, Prince Jorightu, sold the grassland to ethnic Han without Prince Öndür's permission. Accordingly, his family fled westward to a village named mandurkhu. Around 1921, he joined the banner's army and moved further westward to Prince Darkhan's grassland.

== Revolt ==
By the late 1920s, the most productive lands in Darkhan Banner had been cultivated by Chinese peasants. The authorities of Liao-ning Province, then controlled by Chinese warlord Zhang Zuolin, were about to launch cultivation projects, dividing the banner's last land into two areas, Hsi-chia-huang and Liao-pei-huang. Realizing that cultivation would push the Mongols in the banner onto the margin of survival, the ethnic Mongols, both from the ruling class and commonalty, campaigned against colonization. Gada Meiren was one of the leading figures of the campaigns against Liao-pei-huang.

In early 1929, Gada Meiren and others organized a delegation to Mukden to end colonization. Their appeal to Prince Darkhan and Zhang Xueliang (his father Zhang Zuolin had been killed in a bombing) failed. Gada Meiren and three other delegates were imprisoned and sent back to the banner.

The continued land sales, but also more general discontent and desperation lead to open rebellion. Gada Meiren was freed from prison by his wife Mudan and quickly rallied about 200 fighters. Making the northern mountainous area their base, they targeted land surveyors in Hsi-chia-huang and Liao-pei-huang. They also attacked offices to burn land sales contracts. Although the rebels had nationalistic and anti-Chinese motives, they were also supported by poorer parts of the local Chinese population. After Gada had recruited eight companies of local bandits, the rebels numbered more than 1000 fighters. However, these bandits weakened the discipline of Gada's troops.

Prince Darkhan's banner army was unable to crush the rebels. He sought help for Zhang Xueliang. The overwhelming Chinese army from Feng-tien and Jehol surrounded Gada Meiren. In spring 1931, Gada Meiren fell, and the insurgents dispersed. The Chinese army was led by Li Shouxin (Buyandelger), an ethnic Mongol who later worked for the Japanese puppet state Mengjiang.

== Aftermath ==
Soon after Gada Meiren's revolt was crushed, Liao-ning Province resumed their work to set up Liao-pei Country. It forcibly conducted land surveys.

The project was, however, halted by the Mukden Incident in 1931 and the establishment of Manchukuo. Manchukuo took the "Mongolian land protection policy" and aborted all Chinese projects for colonization. The end of cultivation of Hsi-chia-huang and Liao-pei-huang saved Khorchin Left Wing Middle Banner from abolition.

== Narratives in the People's Republic of China ==
In the People's Republic of China, Gada Meiren is regarded as an ethnic Mongol hero who fought "reactionary warlords" (Zhang Zuolin and Zhang Xueliang) and a "feudal lord" (Prince Darkhan). In other words, his activity is interpreted in the context of Marxist class struggle. Various literature is devoted to Gada Meiren in this framework.

The ethnic Mongol scholar, Borjigin Burensain, questions this view and casts his activity as an ethnic conflict between the Mongols and the Han over Mongol land. He points out that the ruling class, not just commoners, campaigned against Han colonization. He also spotlights Yangsanjab, a Mongol prince who led resistance against Han colonization.

== In popular culture ==
The 2002 movie Gada Meilin.

On the basis of oral song traditions, the story of Gada Meiren developed into a long narrative poem of about 600 lines that was published in 1950. In 1980, a version with over 2000 lines was published.

The Mongolian folk song, "Gada Meiren" has been translated into Chinese, and is fairly popular in China. It was prohibited in China during Mao's era, but now it can be seen in Chinese music textbooks. Its Chinese version starts:

Nanfang feilai di xiao hongya ya, bu luo Changjiang, bu ya, bu qifei,
(The little wild geese flew from the south, but cannot restart flying without resting by the Yangtze)
Yao shuo qiyi di Gadameilin, wei liao Menggu ren di tudi.
(It was Gada Meiren who revolted, so to protect the Mongolians' earth.)

Gada Meiren is considered to be a folk hero of Inner Mongolia. In 2002, Feng Xiaoning directed a movie based on the life of Gada Meiren, but depicted his revolt as against the "Japanese invaders" who took the Mongolian's earth. Additionally, the story of Gada Meiren has also inspired a symphonic poem titled Gada Meilin by Chinese composer Xin Huguang, and the cello concerto by Wang Qiang.

== See also ==
- Gada Meilin (film)
