= Thubten Choekyi Nyima, 9th Panchen Lama =

Panchen Lama of Tibet (1883–1937)

Thubten Choekyi Nyima
- ཐུབ་བསྟན་ཆོས་ཀྱི་ཉི་མ་
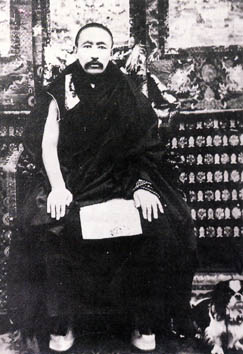
- Thubten Choekyi Nyima, the 9th Panchen Lama
- Title: 9th Panchen Lama

Personal life
- Born: 19 February 1883 Dagpo, Tibet, Qing dynasty
- Died: 1 December 1937 (aged 54) Gyêgu, Qinghai, Republic of China
- Resting place: Tashi Lhunpo Monastery, Shigatse, Tibet Autonomous Region, China

Religious life
- Religion: Tibetan Buddhism

Senior posting
- Predecessor: Tenpai Wangchuk
- Successor: Choekyi Gyaltsen

Thubten Choekyi Nyima

Chinese name
- Traditional Chinese: 圖丹曲吉尼瑪
- Simplified Chinese: 图丹曲吉尼玛
Transcriptions
Standard Mandarin
- Hanyu Pinyin: Túdān Qūjí Nímǎ

Tibetan name
- Tibetan: ཐུབ་བསྟན་ཆོས་ཀྱི་ཉི་མ་
Transcriptions
- Wylie: Thub-bstan Chos-kyi Nyi-ma
- Tibetan Pinyin: Tubdain Qoigyi Nyima

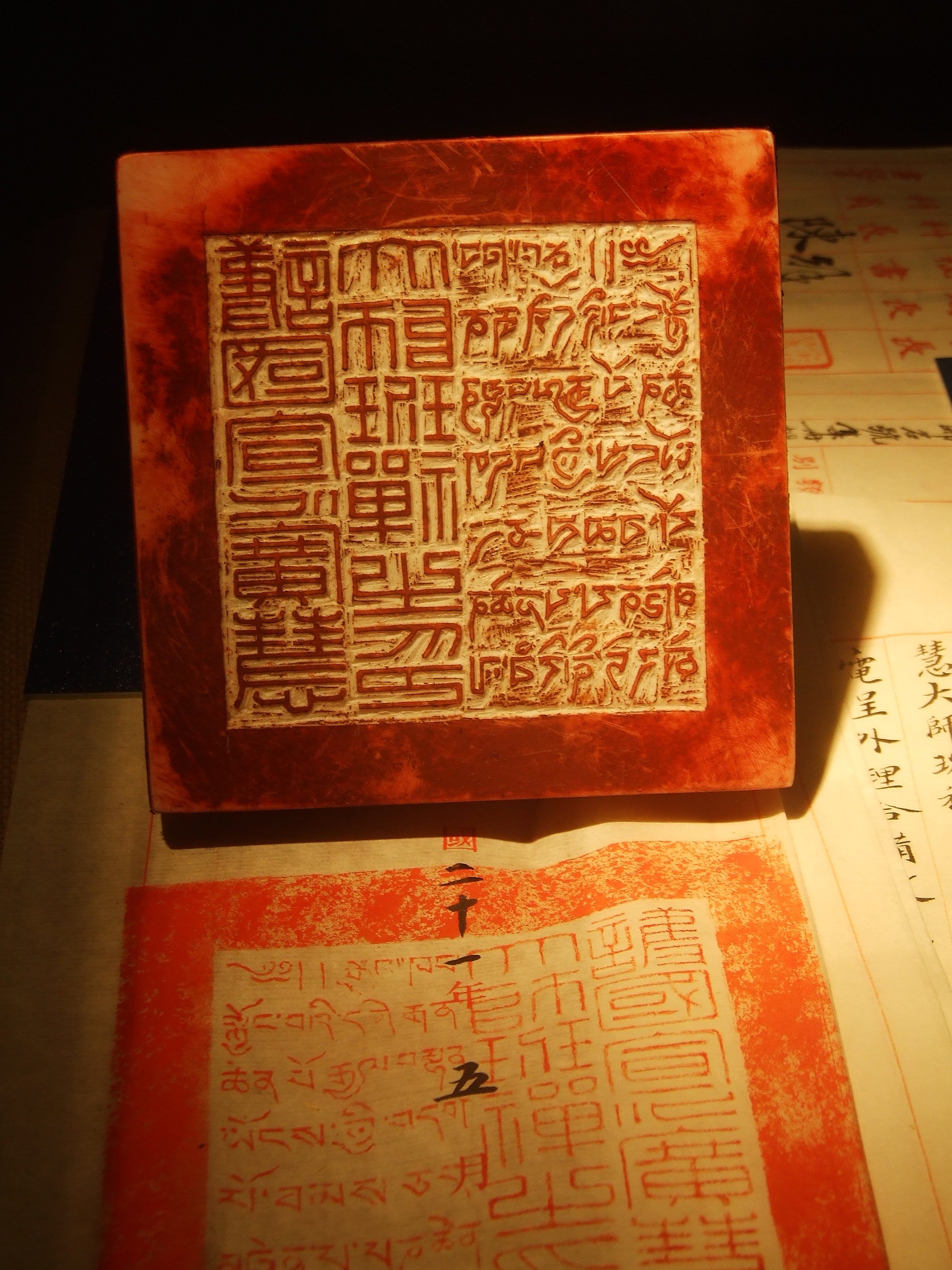
The Republic of China awarded Panchen Lama the Guarding the National Master

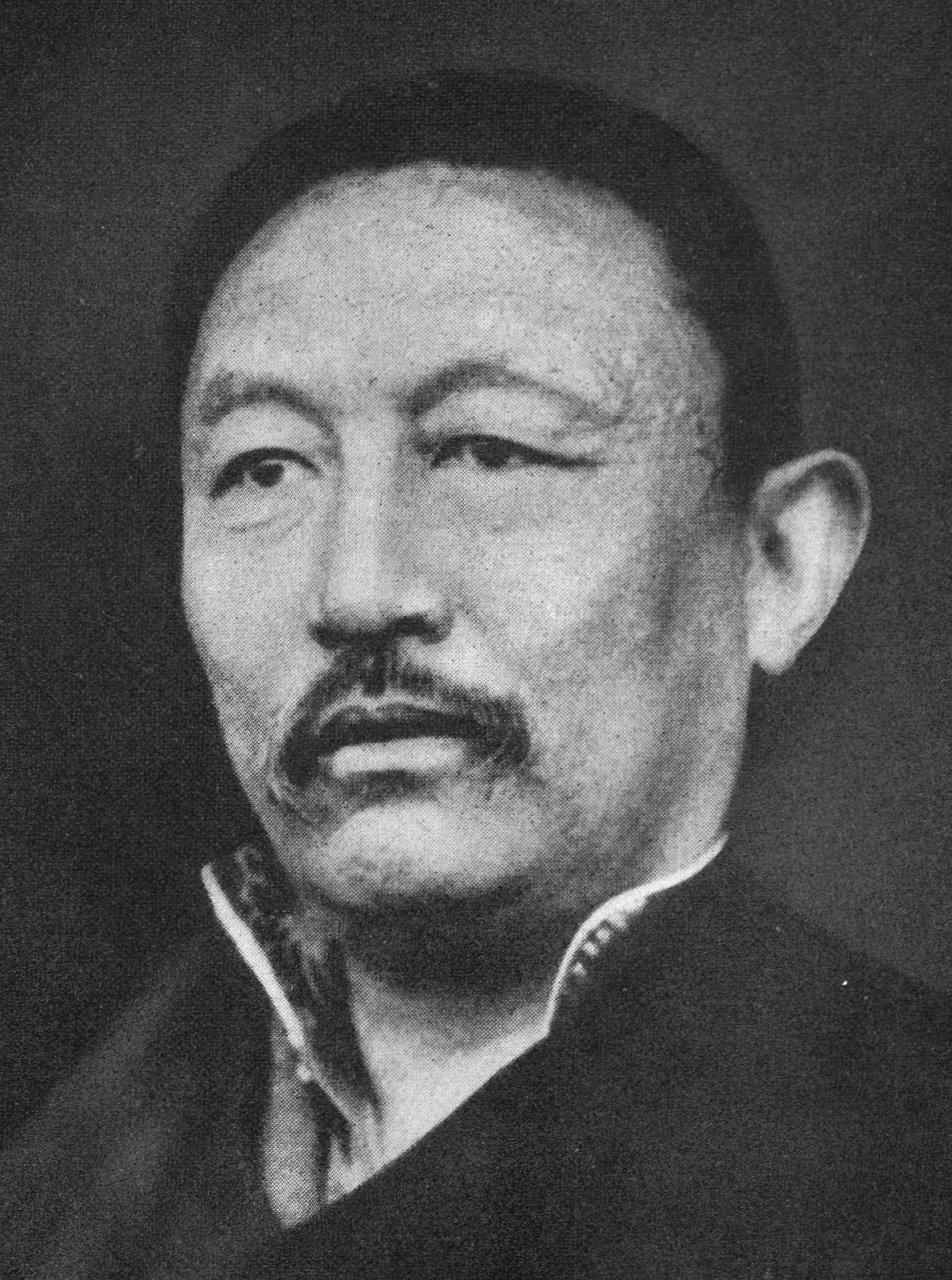
Panchen Lama during his final stay in China 1934

Thubten Choekyi Nyima (Tibetan: ཐུབ་བསྟན་ཆོས་ཀྱི་ཉི་མ་, Wylie: Thub-bstan Chos-kyi Nyi-ma, ZWPY: Tubdain Qoigyi Nyima) (1883–1937), often referred to as Choekyi Nyima, was the ninth Panchen Lama of Tibet.

Thubten Choekyi Nyima is the 9th in his lineage, as recognized by Tashi Lhunpo Monastery, the traditional seat of Panchen Lamas.

In 1901, Choekyi Nyima was visited by the Mongolian Lama, Agvan Dorzhiev. Although he only stayed for two days at Tashilhunpo, Dorzhiev received some secret teachings from the Panchen Lama, as well as readings of the Prayer of Shambhala, written by Lobsang Palden Yeshe, the sixth (or third) Panchen Lama, concerning the Buddhist kingdom of Shambhala, which were of great importance to Dorzhiev's developing understanding of the Kalachakra ('Wheel of Time') tantric teachings. Choekyi Nyima also gave Dorzhiev gifts including some golden statues.

In 1906, Sir Charles Alfred Bell, was invited to visit the 9th Panchen Lama at Tashilhunpo, where they had friendly discussions on the political situation.

He fled to Inner Mongolia, China in 1924 after a dispute with the thirteenth Dalai Lama when he sensed that he might face threat after his own monastery’s monks were prohibited from holding any office in the Central Tibetan government and his officials were locked up in Lhasa. Among the Mongols, the 9th Panchen Lama became a well liked figure. At the same time, study of documents did not confirm widespread claims that rebellions in the 1930s Mongolia were inspired or supported by the 9th Panchen Lama. The Dalai Lama was attempting to collect revenue from the Panchen Lama's estate to cover a fourth of Tibet's military expenses, and to reduce the power of the Panchen Lama, who at the time enjoyed rule over an effectively autonomous region around Shigatse.

In China, the ninth Panchen Lama worked on plans to develop Tibet along modern lines. He also held a position in the Mongolian and Tibetan Affairs Commission.

The Panchen Lama was considered extremely "pro-Chinese", according to official Chinese sources.

Choekyi adopted the ideas of Sun Yat-sen like the Kham revolutionary Pandatsang Rapga. It has been suggested he read the works of Sun Yatsen which were translated by Rapga.

In 1936, a team of monks from Lhasa were on the way to north-eastern Tibet to search for the new reincarnation of the 13th Dalai Lama, who had died in 1933. First, because of the historical close relationship between the Dalai Lama and the Panchen Lama, they visited the Panchen Lama in Kham, eastern Tibet, to seek his advice. He was staying in Jyekundo, a district of eastern Kham that had been annexed from Tibetan government control by the Chinese "during their invasion". The Panchen Lama, being under Chinese power, was being held up there in his attempt to return to Central Tibet due to Chinese interference and insistence that he must be accompanied by a force of 500 armed Chinese soldiers; naturally this condition was not at all acceptable to the Tibetan Government in Lhasa. While negotiations were going on between the Lhasa Government, the Panchen Lama and the Chinese authorities about this escort issue, he was stuck in Jyekundo. He had therefore been busy investigating reports of unusual children born in the area, who might be the reincarnation of the 13th Dalai Lama; the deep spiritual link between the two Lamas had never wavered despite apparent political difficulties and attempted Chinese interference.

In fact, when the search team arrived to see him, the Panchen Lama had already identified three potential candidates. He gave their details to the search party leader, Kewtsang Rinpoche, who then investigated further. One of these three candidates was already dead and another ran away crying when shown the objects belonging to the late Dalai Lama. The third candidate, who lived in Taktser, was characterised as "fearless" and he was indeed found to be the true incarnation. Thus, it was this Panchen Lama Thubten Choekyi Nyima who first discovered and identified the 14th Dalai Lama.

In 1937, the Panchen Lama died in Gyêgu (Tibetan: Jyekundo; Chinese: Yushu) in Qinghai Province without being able to return to Tsang.

The tombs of the fifth through the ninth Panchen Lamas were destroyed during the Cultural Revolution and have been rebuilt by the tenth Panchen Lama with a huge tomb at Tashilhunpo Monastery in Shigatse, known as the Tashi Langyar.

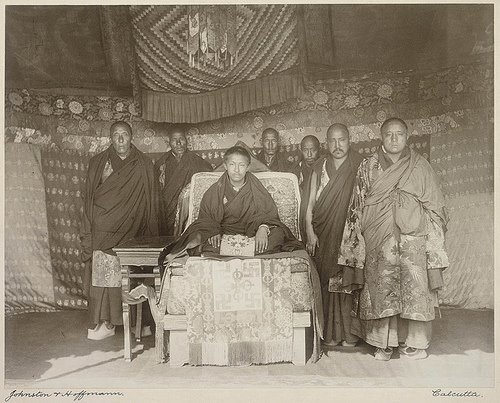
Panchen Lama and entourage in Calcutta, 1906

== See also ==
- Yangsanjab, Mongol prince who hosted Lama's Ceremony

== Notes ==
Buddhist titles
Preceded by Tenpe Wangchuk	Panchen Lama	Succeeded by Choekyi Gyaltsen
