= Yungtön Dorjepel =

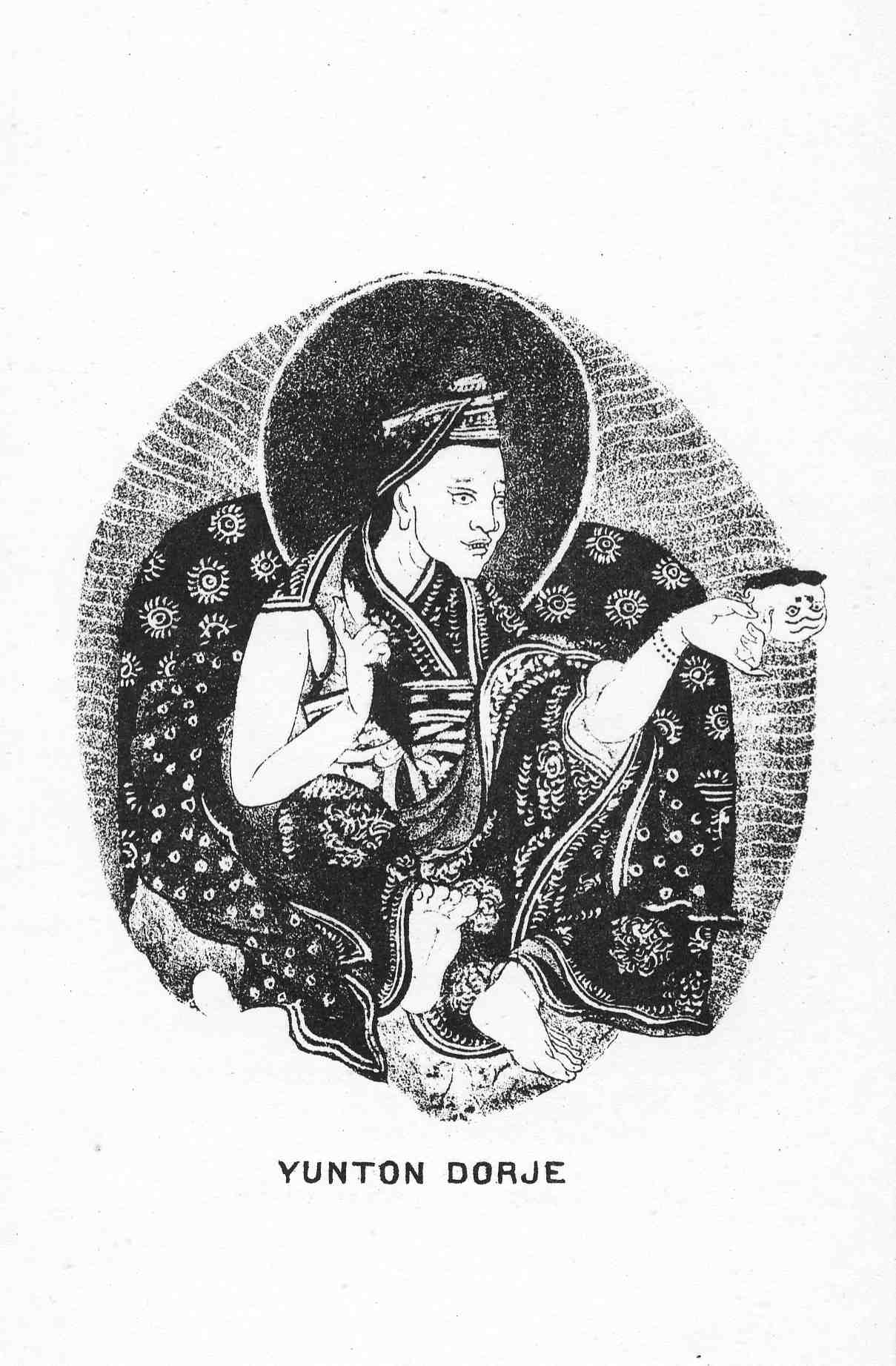
Yungtön Dorjepel

Yungtön Dorjepel (Wylie: g.yung ston rdo rje dpa) was born at Gorma (or Gurmo) near Shalu Monastery in the province of Tsang in 1284 CE into the family of a tantric priest of the Len clan.

During his youth he went to China on the command of the Emperor where he caused rain to fall after a long drought. He gained a deep understanding of the Kalachakra under Putön Rinpoche. He cultivated the esoteric instructions, particularly Dzogchen, due to the great inspiration of Rangjung Dorje, 3rd Karmapa Lama.

He resided and taught in various places such as Paro in Bhutan, Phungpo Riwoche, and Ratam Trak. He died in 1365 CE.

In the lineage of the Tibetan Panchen Lamas there were considered to be four Indian and three Tibetan incarnations of Amitābha before Khedrup Gelek Pelzang, 1st Panchen Lama. The lineage starts with Subhuti, one of the original disciples of Gautama Buddha. Yungtön Dorjepel is considered to be the final Tibetan incarnation of Amitābha before the Panchen Lamas.
