= Yangsanjab =

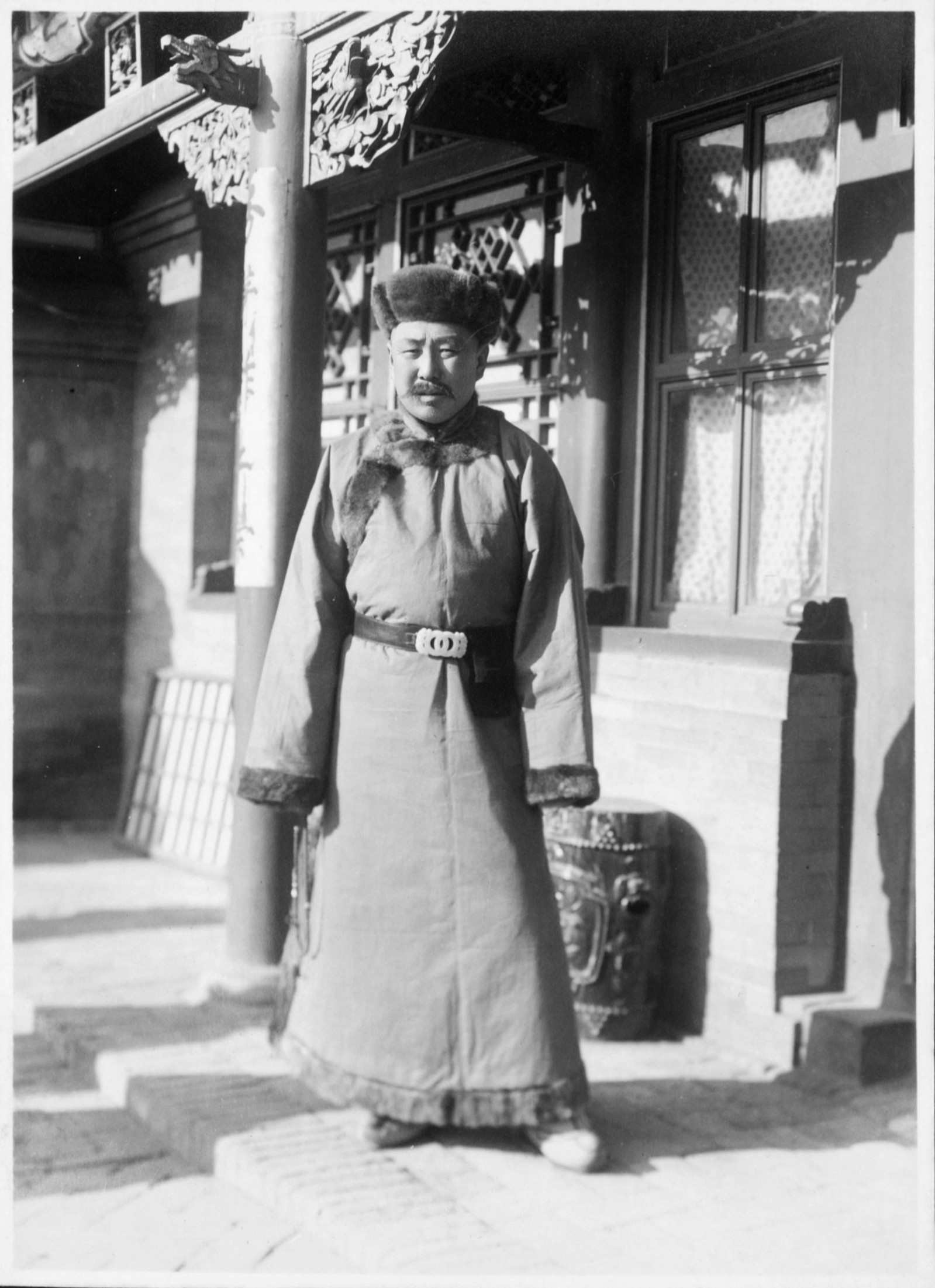
Yangsanjab

Yangsanjab, Prince Öndür, was a Mongol prince of the Khorchin Left Wing Middle Banner in southeastern Mongolia. He was one of the leading figures in the resistance against Han colonization of Mongolia. Unlike Ghada Meyiren, he is rarely spotlighted.

== Background ==
Yangsanjab was born to the hereditary house of Prince Öndür, which was placed second (doroi giyūn wang) in Manchu-Mongol royal ranks. He belonged to the Borjigin clan and was a descendant of Hasar, Genghis Khan's younger brother. Hasar's descendant Jayisang contributed to the rise of Manchu-led Qing dynasty (1644–1912) and intermarried with the Aisin Gioro imperial family. Jayisang's descendants ruled the Khorchin Left Wing Middle Banner (commonly called Darkhan Banner; now Khorchin Left Wing Middle Banner, Tongliao City, Inner Mongolia) of Jirim League. The jasagh, or the banner's head was occupied by Prince Darkhan, the descendants of Jayisang's last son. The house of Prince Öndür was one of other branch families founded by Jayisang's sons.

As Jirim League was close to China proper, it was subjected to an enormous population pressure from the Chinese heartland. The Han immigrants came under the administration of Chinese prefectures, and the Mongol banner quickly shrunk. The banner became too small for the Mongols to keep nomadic pastoralism. From the 19th century on, they were forced to move northward or were settled into agricultural villages. In its final years, the Qing dynasty promoted Han colonization of Mongolia to increase tax revenues and build a borderland defense. The Republic of China, which overthrew the Qing dynasty, boosted Han colonization. By the 1920s, the most part of Darkhan Banner was controlled by ethnic Han.

== Activity ==
He succeeded his father Nayangerel as Prince Öndür as late as in 1920, but had gained popularity among the Mongols in the banner even before the succession. He stayed in Beijing for about six months a year, starting in 1915, and engaged in political activities to protect the rights of the Mongols. In addition, Prince Öndür became the sole mainstay among the Mongols, because by that time, the other powerful princely houses, Princes Darkhan and Jorightu, had left the banner for Mukden.

Yangsanjab was a disciple of the Janggiya Khutughtu, the highest-ranking lama in southern Mongolia. Using the Tibetan Buddhist connection, he got close to the 9th Panchen Lama. In 1926, Yangsanjab and Prince Darkhan invited the Panchen Lama to Darkhan Banner. The lama stayed in the banner for nearly a year beginning in 1927. He hosted the Lama's Ceremony, to which Mongol princes came from all over Mongolia, and succeeded in increasing his presence.

By the late 1920s, the most productive lands in Darkhan Banner had been cultivated by Han peasants, and the authorities of Liao-ning Province (renamed from Feng-tien in 1929) were about to launch cultivation projects, dividing the banner's last land into two areas, Hsi-chia-huang and Liao-pei-huang. Realizing that cultivation would push the Mongols in the banner onto the margin of survival, Yangsanjab and other princes and tayiji pressed the government of Liao-ning to stop the projects in 1930. He also worked on the 9th Panchen Lama, then in the banner, to place pressure on the Chinese province. However, Liao-ning Province made no concessions, and forcibly conducted the cultivation projects.

The failure of the negotiations led Yangsanjab to mobilize a private army consisting of hundreds of Mongols. Yangsanjab's army was originally organized by his father, Nayangerel, to defend the banner from bandits when the Qing dynasty began to fall after the Xinhai Revolution. His army started anti-cultivation activities, including the obstruction of farm surveys. In response Liao-ning Province crushed the Mongol troops with its own provincial army. The warlord government ordered that Yangsanjab's troops be incorporated into the jasagh's (the ruler of the banner's) army. The province made Prince Darkhan take disciplinary action against Yangsanjab, possibly because direct punishment by the Chinese authority would further inflame Mongols' anti-Chinese sentiment.

In spite of intensifying resistance against it, the Chinese cultivation project proceeded. The project was halted, however, by the Mukden Incident in 1931, and the establishment of Manchukuo. Manchukuo took the "Mongolian land protection policy" and aborted all Chinese projects for colonization. The end of cultivation of Hsi-chia-huang and Liao-pei-huang saved Khorchin Left Wing Middle Banner from abolition.

Yangsanjab placed great hopes in Manchukuo's policy toward Mongol banners. He fully cooperated with Manchukuo, and became the first head of the Khorchin Left Wing Middle Banner, instead of Prince Darkhan, who exhibited an uncooperative attitude toward Manchukuo. Yangsanjab died in Xinjing in 1941.
