= Gada Meilin (film) =

- DVD cover
- Directed by: Feng Xiaoning
- Written by: Feng Xiaoning
- Produced by: Feng Xiaoning
- Starring: Ebusi; Deligeer; Hu Xiaoguang
- Cinematography: Feng Xiaoning; Gang Qiang
- Edited by: Cheng Jie
- Music by: San Bao
- Production companies: Beijing Forbidden City Film Co., Ltd. China Film Group Corporation
- Release date: 2002
- Running time: 109 minutes
- Country: China
- Language: Chinese

Gada Meilin is a 2002 historical drama film directed by Chinese director Feng Xiaoning. It deals with the story of Inner Mongolian hero Gada Meiren, who led a failed rebellion at the beginning of the 1930s against dispossession of Mongol banner lands by Zhang Zuolin and Zhang Xueliang.

== Cast ==
- Deligeer
- Ebusi
- Hu Xiaoguang
- Li Ming
- Liu Wei as Mu Dan
- Tu Men
