= Xumi Fushou Temple =

Buddhist temple in Chengde, China

Coordinates: 41.017858°N 117.942696°E

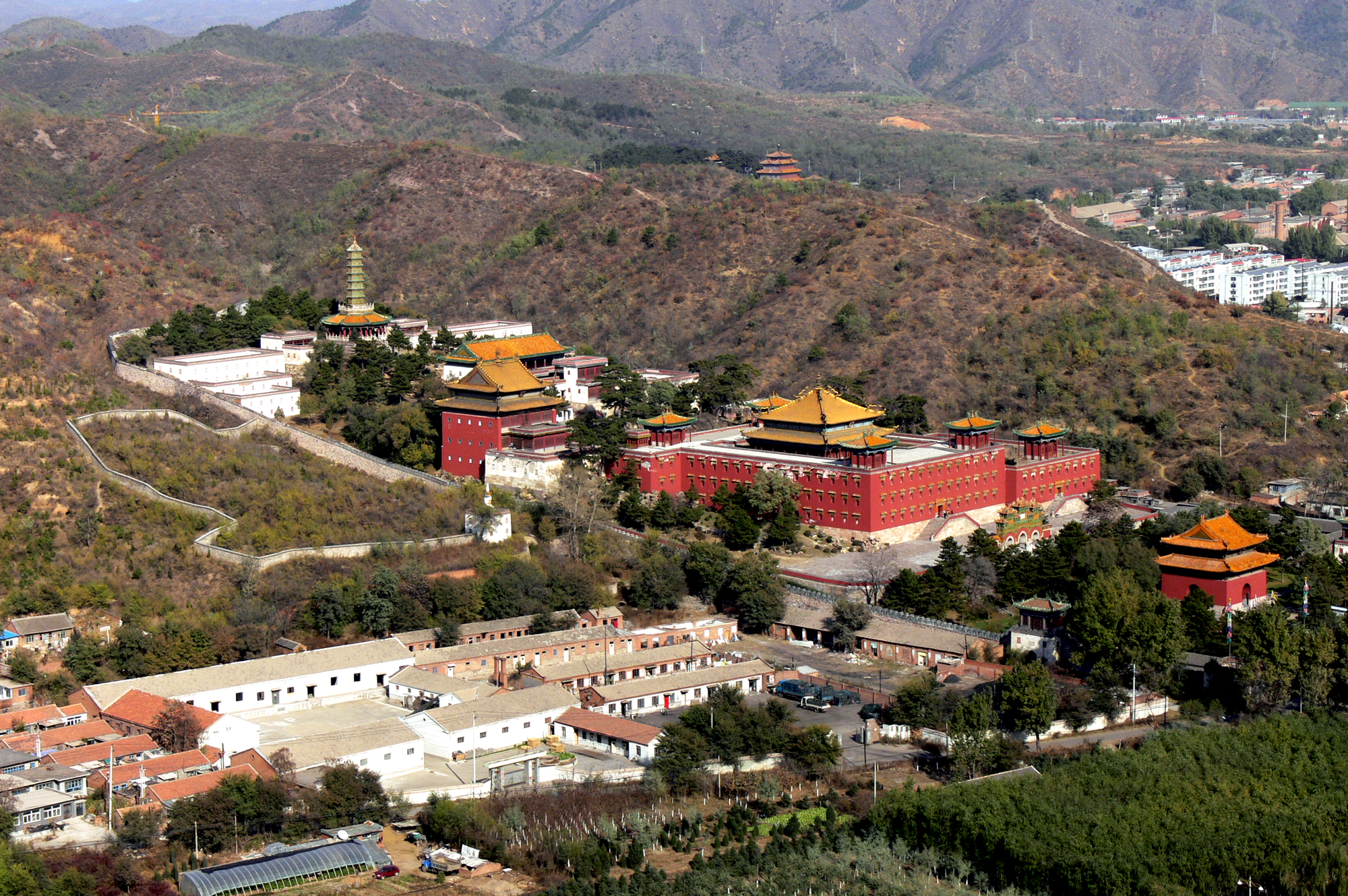
- Xumi Fushou Temple

Religion
- Affiliation: Buddhist
- Province: Hebei
- Region: China
- Leadership: Lobsang Palden Yeshe, 6th Panchen Lama; Qianlong Emperor
- Status: Preserved

Location
- Municipality: Chengde
- Interactive map of Xumi Fushou Temple

Architecture
- Style: Tibetan and Chinese
- Completed: 1780

Xumi Fushou Temple
- Simplified Chinese: 须弥福寿之庙
- Traditional Chinese: 須彌福壽之廟
- Literal meaning: Temple of Happiness and Longevity of the Sumeru Mountain
Transcriptions
Standard Mandarin
- Hanyu Pinyin: Xūmí Fúshòu Zhī Miào
- Wade–Giles: Hsü-mi Fu-shou chih Miao

The Xumi Fushou Temple (Chinese: 须弥福寿之庙) is one of the Eight Outer Temples in Chengde, Hebei, China. This Buddhist temple is in the north of the park complex of the Chengde Mountain Resort, to the east of Putuo Zongcheng Temple on the north side of a slightly upward slope hill. The temple covers an area of 37,900 m^{2} (408,000 ft^{2}).

== History ==
The temple was first designed in 1780 to celebrate the 70th birthday of the Qianlong Emperor. It was built for Penchen Lama the VI who came to Chengde from Tibet to convey his congratulations and is a fusion of Chinese and Tibetan architectural style.

== Structures ==
Its main building, the Great Red Terrace (Dahongtai, simplified Chinese: 大红台; traditional Chinese: 大紅臺), has three stories, and was furthermore built on a three-story foundation. The Miaogaozhuangyan Hall (妙高莊嚴殿) where the Panchen Lama preached is the center of the temple. The Jixiangfaxi Hall (吉样法喜殿) with a roof made of gold plated copper tiles was the home of Penchen Lama. Other buildings are the seven-story octagonal Liuli-Wanshou pagoda (琉璃万寿塔 "Glazed Tile Pagoda of Longevity") and a glazed tile paifang (琉璃牌坊). In the stele pavilion of the temple is a memorial plaque with stone engraving in Manchu, Chinese, Mongolian and Tibetan script, with an inscription in memory of events.

== Paleontology ==
From 1979 and into the 1980s, the Eight Outer Temples and Chengde Mountain Resort were renovated using local stone slabs. Since 1992, fossilized dinosaur tracks in the rock slabs have been reported from Hebei and the surrounding area. Over 40 tracks were found at Xumi Fushou Temple, in front of the front door and behind the páilóu.
