= Lobsang Yeshe, 5th Panchen Lama =

5th Panchen Lama of the Gelug School of Tibetan Buddhism

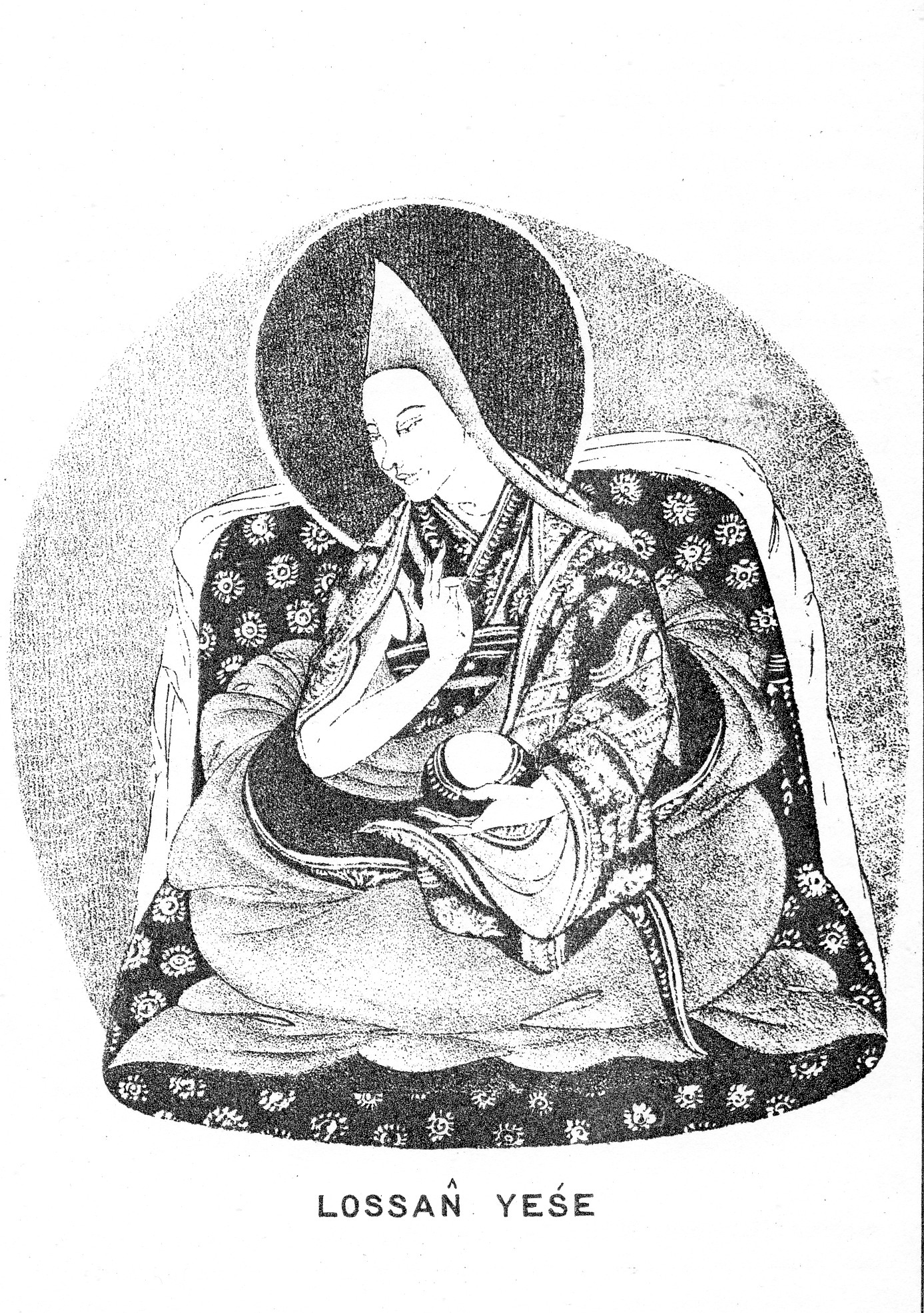
Lobsang Yeshe

Lobsang Yeshe (Tibetan: བློ་བཟང་ཡེ་ཤེས་, Wylie: Blo-bzang Ye-shes, ZWPY: Lobsang Yêxê; also written Lobsang Yeshi) (1663–1737) was the fifth Panchen Lama of Tibet.

== Biography ==
He was born of a well-known and noble family in the province of Tsang. His father's name was Dechen-Gyalpo, and his mother's was Serab-Drolma. He was soon recognised as the true incarnation of Lobsang Chökyi Gyaltsen (1570–1662), the Fourth Panchen Lama of Tibet, and was installed with great ceremony at Tashilhunpo Monastery.

He received novice vows when he was 8 (9 by Western reckoning) in Lhasa from Lozang Gyatso, the Great Fifth Dalai Lama (1617 – 1682), when he was given the name of Lobsang Yeshe. At the age of twenty [21], he was ordained by Kon-chhog Gyal-tsan.

When he was thirty-two (in 1696 or 1697), he sent a congratulatory deputation to Beijing. The Kangxi Emperor (1662-1723) invited him to Beijing, but he asked to be excused for fear of smallpox.

The Regent, Sangye Gyatso (Sangs-rgyas rgya-mtsho), invited the Fifth Panchen Lama, Lobsang Yeshi, to administer the vows of a novice monk to the 6th Dalai Lama at the town of Nangartse on Lake Yamdrok Yamtso, and named him Tsang Gyatso. In October 1697, Tsangyang Gyatso was enthroned as the Sixth Dalai Lama.

In 1701, Lhazang Khan, a Mongol king and ally of the Chinese, had the Regent, Sangye Gyatso, killed. This greatly upset the young Dalai Lama, who left his studies and even visited Lobsang Yeshe, the 5th Panchen Lama, in Shigatse and renounced his novice monk vows.

In 1713, he received a letter written in three different languages, Tibetan, Mongol, and Manchu, in gold from the Kangxi Emperor, who sent him a large tangka with his title on it.

The 7th Dalai Lama was enthroned in the Potala Palace in 1720. He took the novice vows of monkhood from the 5th Panchen Lama, Lobsang Yeshi, who gave him the name Kelzang Gyatso. He took the Gelong vows (full ordination) from Lobsang Yeshi in 1726.

In 1728, the Yongzheng Emperor (1723-1736) sent Aliha Ampan to settle the border between the provinces of U and Tsang. There was a civil war at this time, and the Chinese asked the Panchen Lama if he would rule all the territories between Khambala and Mount Kailash. The Panchen Lama refused a few times on the grounds of old age but was finally convinced to take control of the whole of Tibet lying to the west of Panam, and relinquished possession of Phari, Gyantse, and Yardosho and other places to the government in Lhasa.

He wrote eighteen volumes of hymns and precepts and died at the age of 75 (74 by Western reckoning), in 1737.

A gilt copper domed tomb, like that of his predecessor, only larger, was built for him. Unfortunately, all the tombs from the Fifth to the Ninth Panchen Lamas were destroyed during the Cultural Revolution and have been replaced by the 10th Panchen Lama with a huge tomb at Tashilhunpo Monastery in Shigatse, known as the Tashi Langyar.

Preceded by Lobsang Choekyi Gyaltsen	Panchen Lama	Succeeded by Lobsang Palden Yeshe
