= Ensapa Lobsang Döndrup, 3rd Panchen Lama =

Tibetan Buddhist leader (1505 – c. 1566)

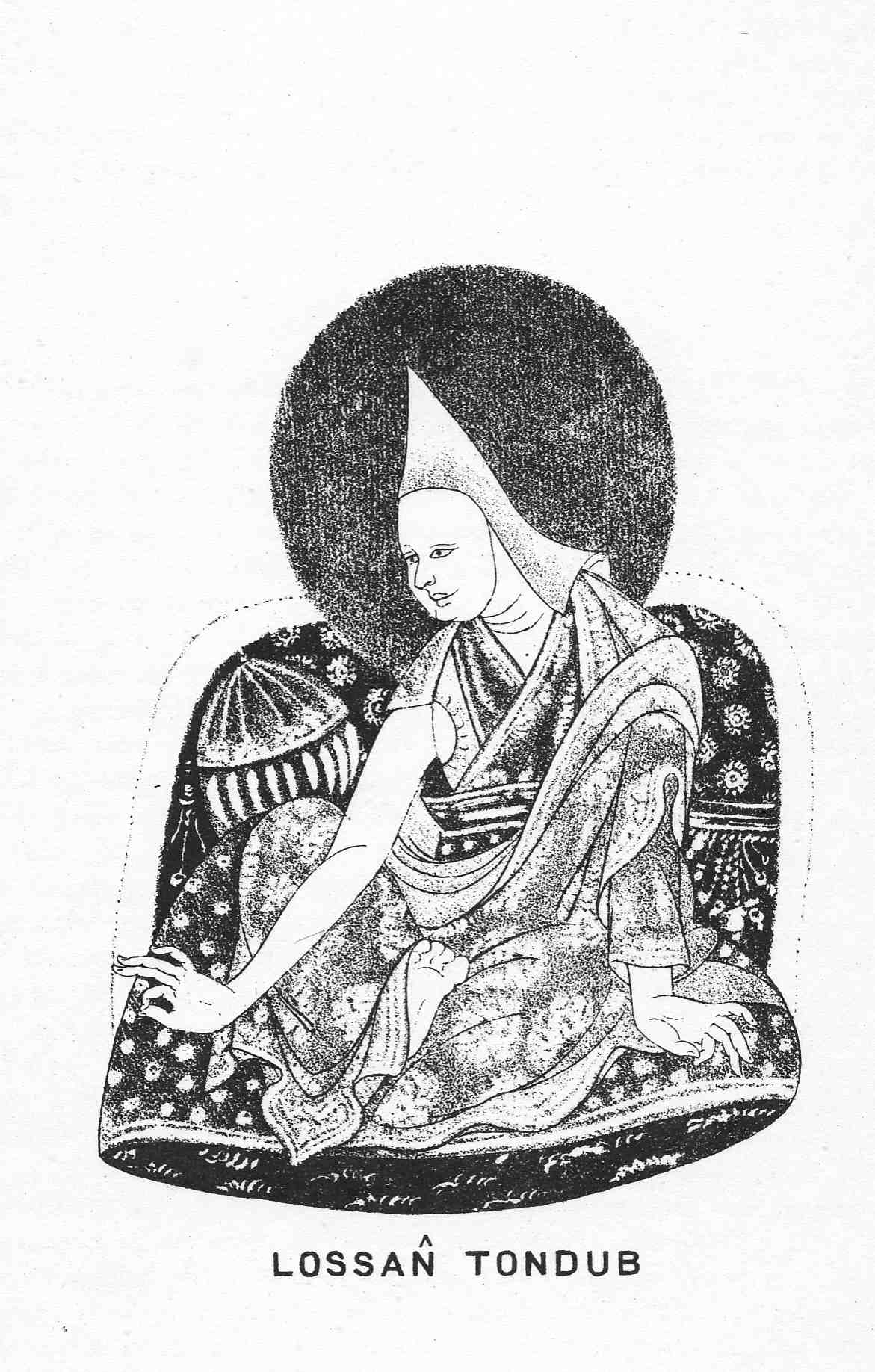

Tibetan name
- Tibetan: དབེན་ས་པ་བློ་བཟང་དོན་གྲུབ་
Transcriptions
- Wylie: dben sa pa blo bzang don grub
- THL: Wensapa Blopzang Döndrup
- Tibetan Pinyin: Wênsaba Lobsang Toinchub
- Lhasa IPA: [wẽsapa lopsaŋ tø̃ʈʂup]

Chinese name
- Traditional Chinese: 羅桑丹珠
- Simplified Chinese: 罗桑丹珠
Transcriptions
Standard Mandarin
- Hanyu Pinyin: Luósāng Dānzhū

Ensapa Lobsang Döndrup (1505–c. 1566) was a Tibetan Buddhist religious leader. He was posthumously recognised as the third Panchen Lama.

Ensapa was known to have spent more than 20 years meditating in isolated caves near the Himalayan mountains. When he was a young boy Gyalwa Ensäpa received many visions of Buddha Shakyamuni. He also possessed natural clairvoyance and was able to know that people were about to visit his family even when they were still many days' journey away. Later, when he ordained as a monk, he was able to recite the entire Perfection of Wisdom Sutra in Eight Thousand Lines from memory, both in Tibetan and in Sanskrit. His fellow monks, who had never heard Sanskrit spoken, thought that he was possessed by spirits.

Preceded by Sönam Choklang	Panchen Lama	Succeeded by Lobsang Chökyi Gyaltsen
