= Sönam Choklang, 2nd Panchen Lama =

Tibetan Buddhist religious leader (1439–1504)

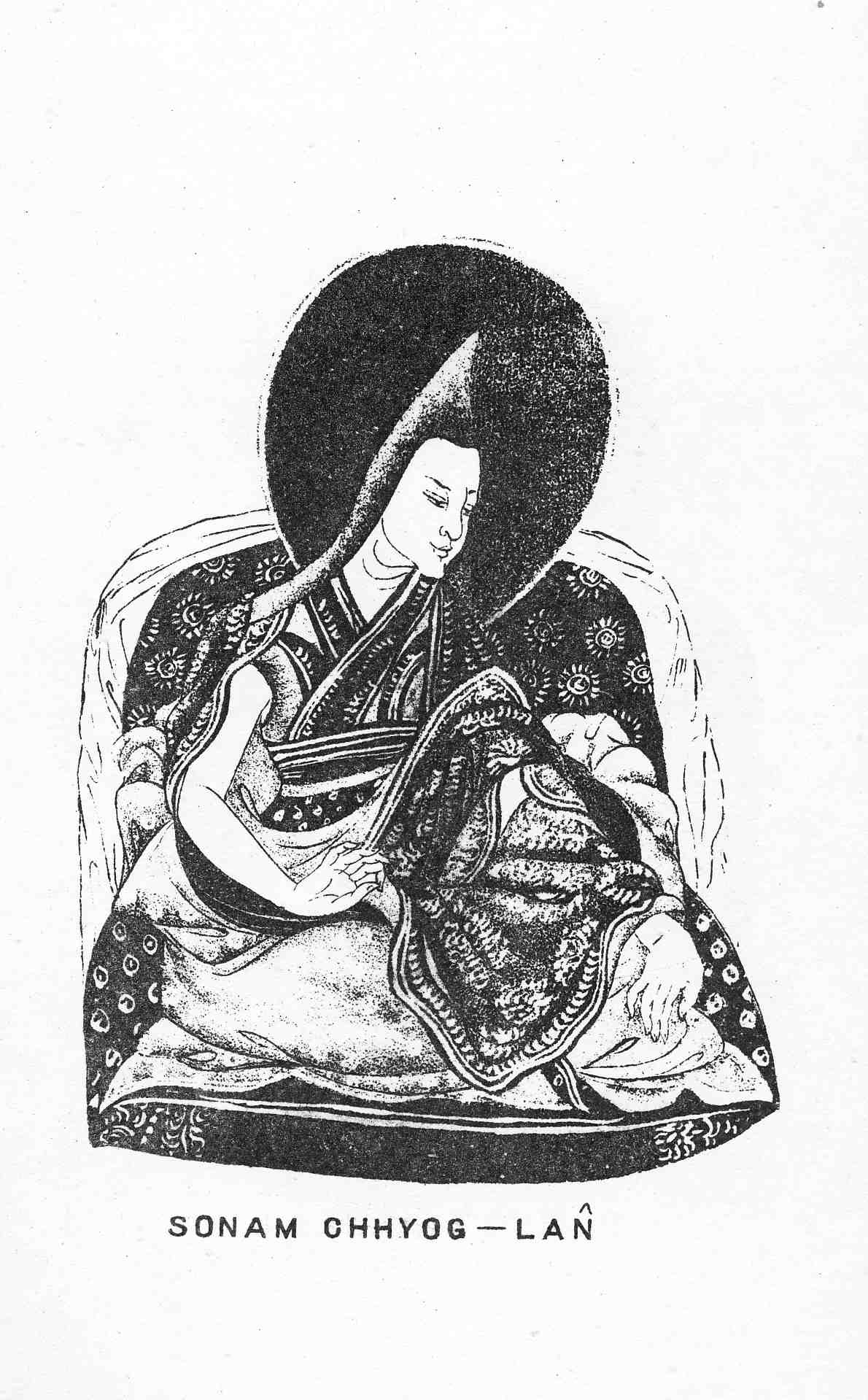
- Sönam Choklang

Tibetan name
- Tibetan: བསོད་ནམས་ཕྱོག་ཀྱི་གླང་པོ་་
Transcriptions
- Wylie: bsod nams phyogs glang, bsod nams phyogs kyi glang po
- THL: Sönam Choklang
- Tibetan Pinyin: Soinam Qoglang, Soinam Qoggyi Langbo
- Lhasa IPA: [søʔnam tɕʰɔʔci laŋpɔ]

Chinese name
- Traditional Chinese: 索南却朗
- Simplified Chinese: 索南却朗
Transcriptions
Standard Mandarin
- Hanyu Pinyin: Suǒnán Quèlǎng

Sönam Choklang (1439–1504) was a Tibetan Buddhist religious leader. He was from Tsang Province. He was posthumously recognised as the second Panchen Lama.

He founded Wensa Monastery in Tsang, a Gelug hermitage known for the Wensa Nyengyu teachings.

Preceded by Khedrup Je	Panchen Lama	Succeeded by Ensapa Lobsang Döndrup
