= Khedrup Gelek Pelzang, 1st Panchen Lama =

Tibetan Buddhist religious leader (1385–1438)

Khedrup Gelek Pelzang
- 1st Panchen Lama of Tibet
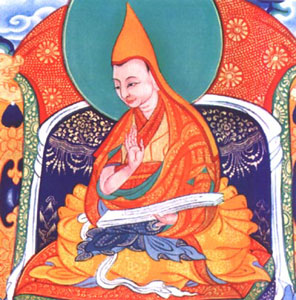
- Khedrup Gelek Pelzang, 1st Panchen Lama
- Predecessor: Yungtön Dorjepel
- Successor: Sönam Choklang, 2nd Panchen Lama
- Born: 1385; Tsang, Tibet
- Died: 1438 (aged 52–53)
- Tibetan: མཁས་གྲུབ་རྗེ་
- Wylie: mkhas-grub dge legs dpal bzang po
- House: Panchen Lama

Khedrup Gelek Pelzang, 1st Panchen Lama (1385–1438 CE) – better known as Khedrup Je – was one of the main disciples of Je Tsongkhapa, whose reforms to Atiśa's Kadam tradition are considered the beginnings of the Gelug school of Tibetan Buddhism.

Khedrub Je is considered to be an emanation of Manjusri, the Buddha of Wisdom.

== Recognition ==
Khedrub Je was posthumously decided by the 5th Dalai Lama to have been a previous incarnation of Lobsang Chökyi Gyaltsen, 4th Panchen Lama (1570–1662). Like all the Panchen Lamas, he is considered to be an incarnation of Amitābha Buddha. Traditionally, there were considered to be four Indian and three Tibetan incarnations before Khedrup, starting with Subhuti, one of the original disciples of Gautama Buddha.

According to the legend, after Tsongkhapa died in 1419, his disciple Khedrub Jey on five occasions met with him in mystical states. Kedrub Jey is most remembered for his charisma as a teacher, as well as for the many excellent commentaries that he wrote on the tantric lineages which Tsongkhapa gathered together and elucidated. He played an important role in the education of the First Dalai Lama, who was the youngest of Tsongkhapa's five chief disciples.

== Background ==
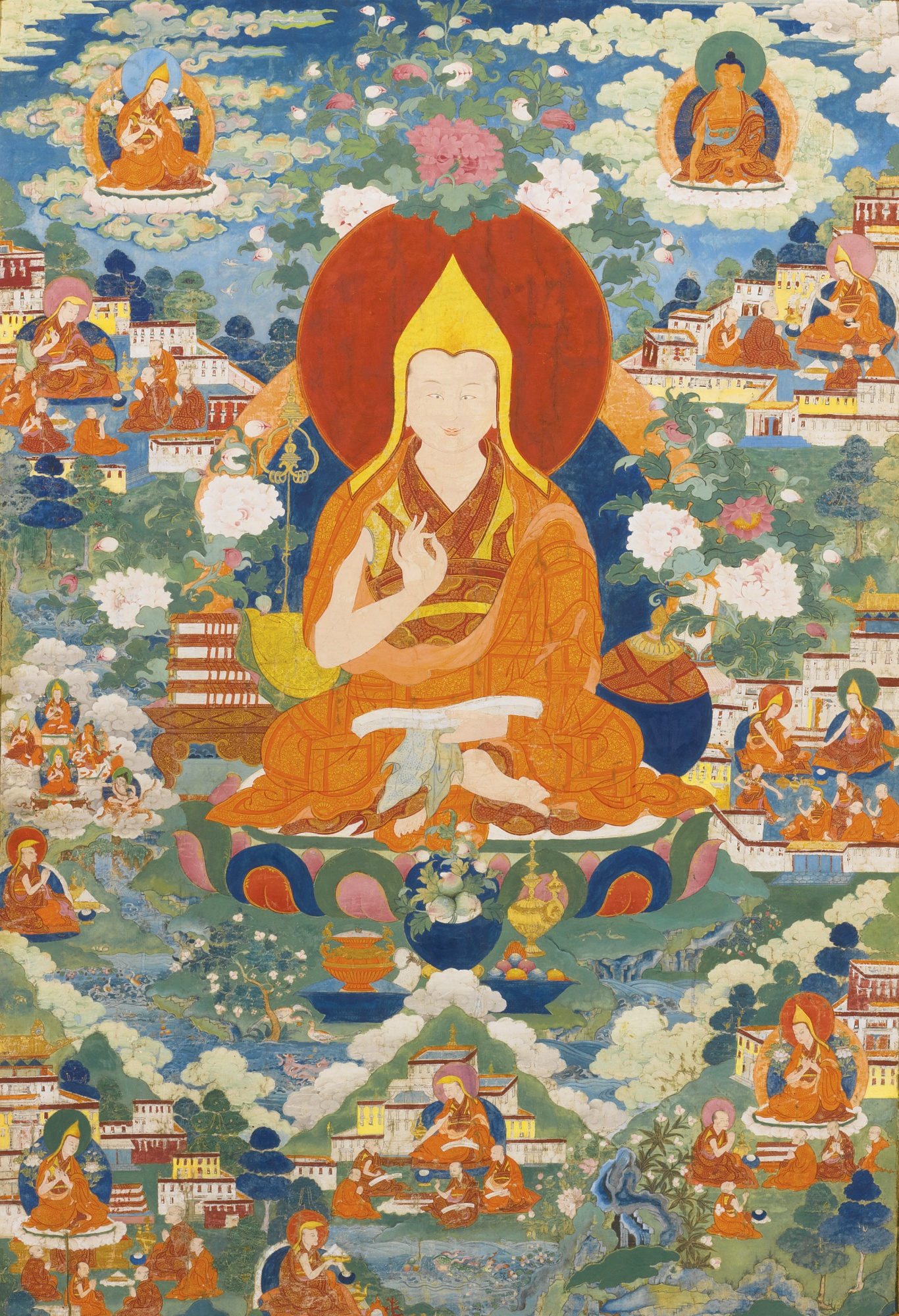
A thangka depicting Khedrup Gelek Pelzang, circa 1800

Before becoming Tsongkhapa's foremost disciple, Khedrup Je had been a learned Sakya scholar.

== Writings ==
Altogether, Khedrub Je's collected works total nine volumes in all, comprising a total of fifty-eight treatises. He also wrote many prayer books.

=== Kalachakra ===
Khedrub Je wrote an important text on Kalachakra that is still used by the current 14th Dalai Lama, as the basis for his public empowerments into the practice of the Kalachakra Tantra.

=== Mahamudra ===
Khedrub Je also wrote a root text on mahamudra.

== Monastic career ==
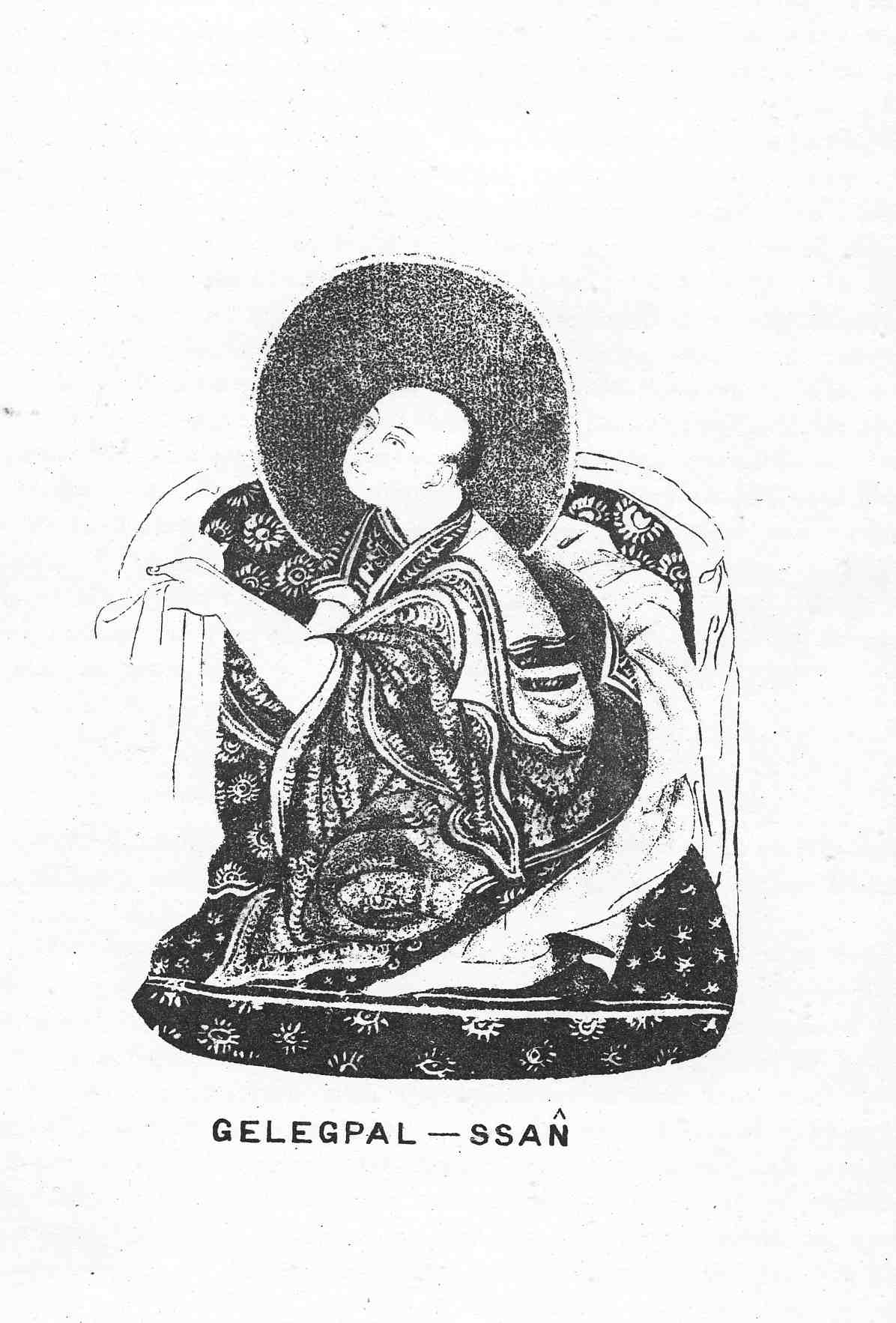
Khedrup Je

Khedrup Je was unanimously chosen as Ganden Monastery's third abbot (after Tsongkhapa and Gyaltsab Je) by its monks, and also became the Ganden Tripa, the leader of the Gelug tradition. He also founded Palcho Monastery in Gyantse in 1418 as well as the large Riwo Chöling Monastery in the Yarlung Valley, which is now just a heap of ruins.

== Footnotes ==
Preceded by Yungtön Dorjepel	1st Incarnation of the Panchen Lama	Succeeded by Sönam Choklang
