= Lobsang Palden Yeshe, 6th Panchen Lama =

Panchen Lama

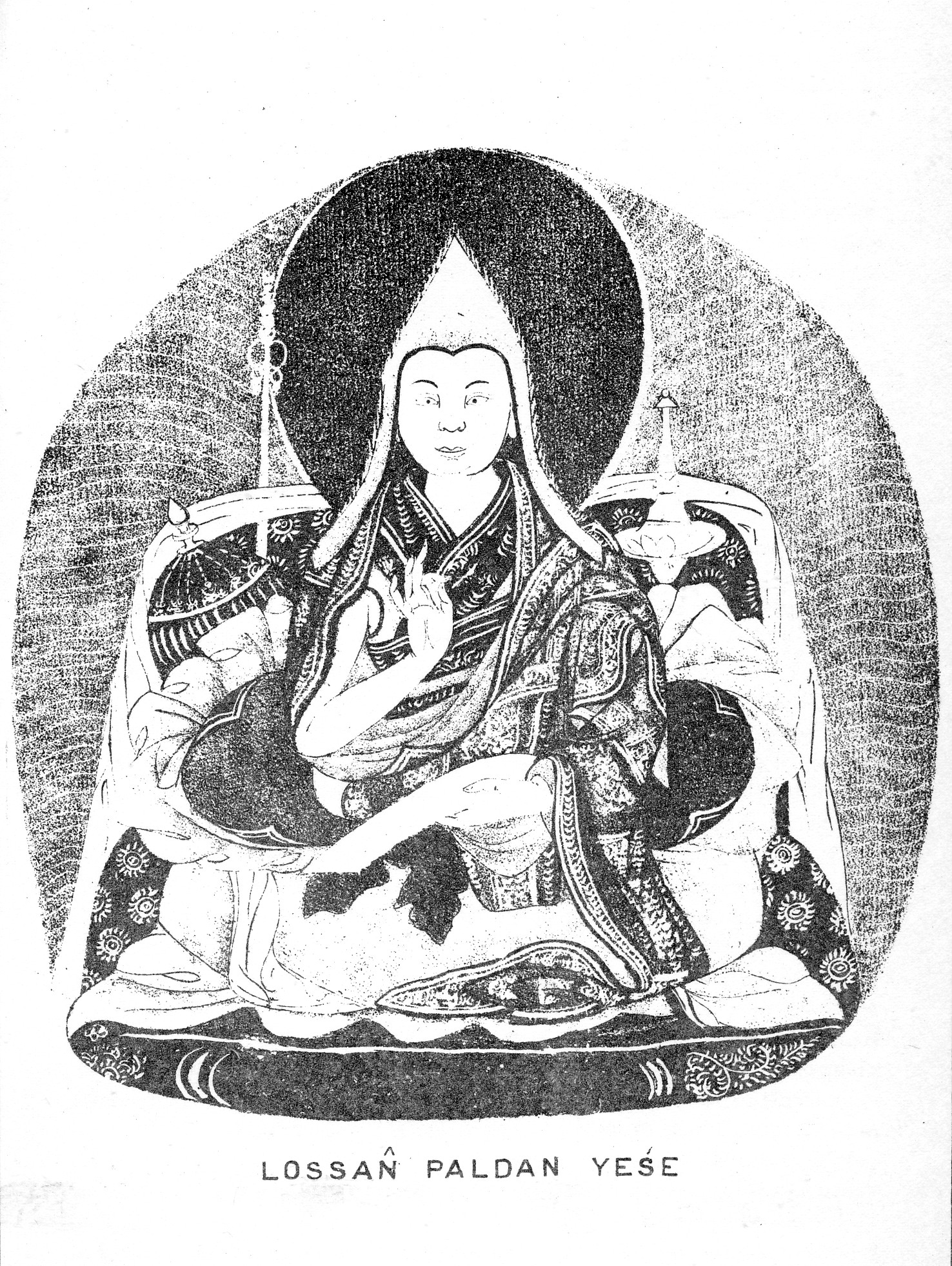
Lobsang Palden Yeshe

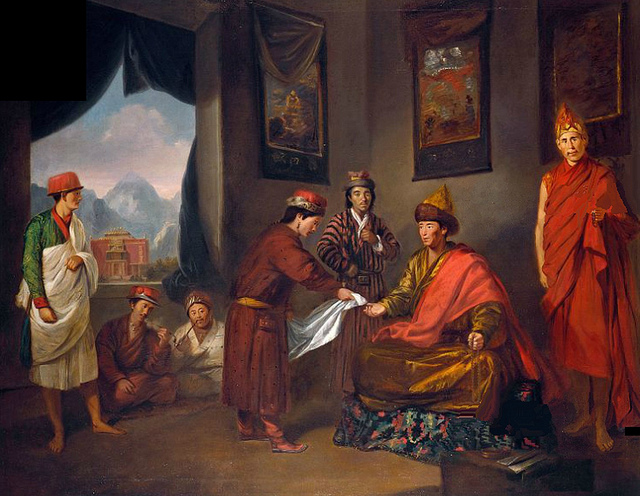
The Sixth Panchen Lama Receives George Bogle at Tashilhunpo, oil painting by Tilly Kettle, c. 1775

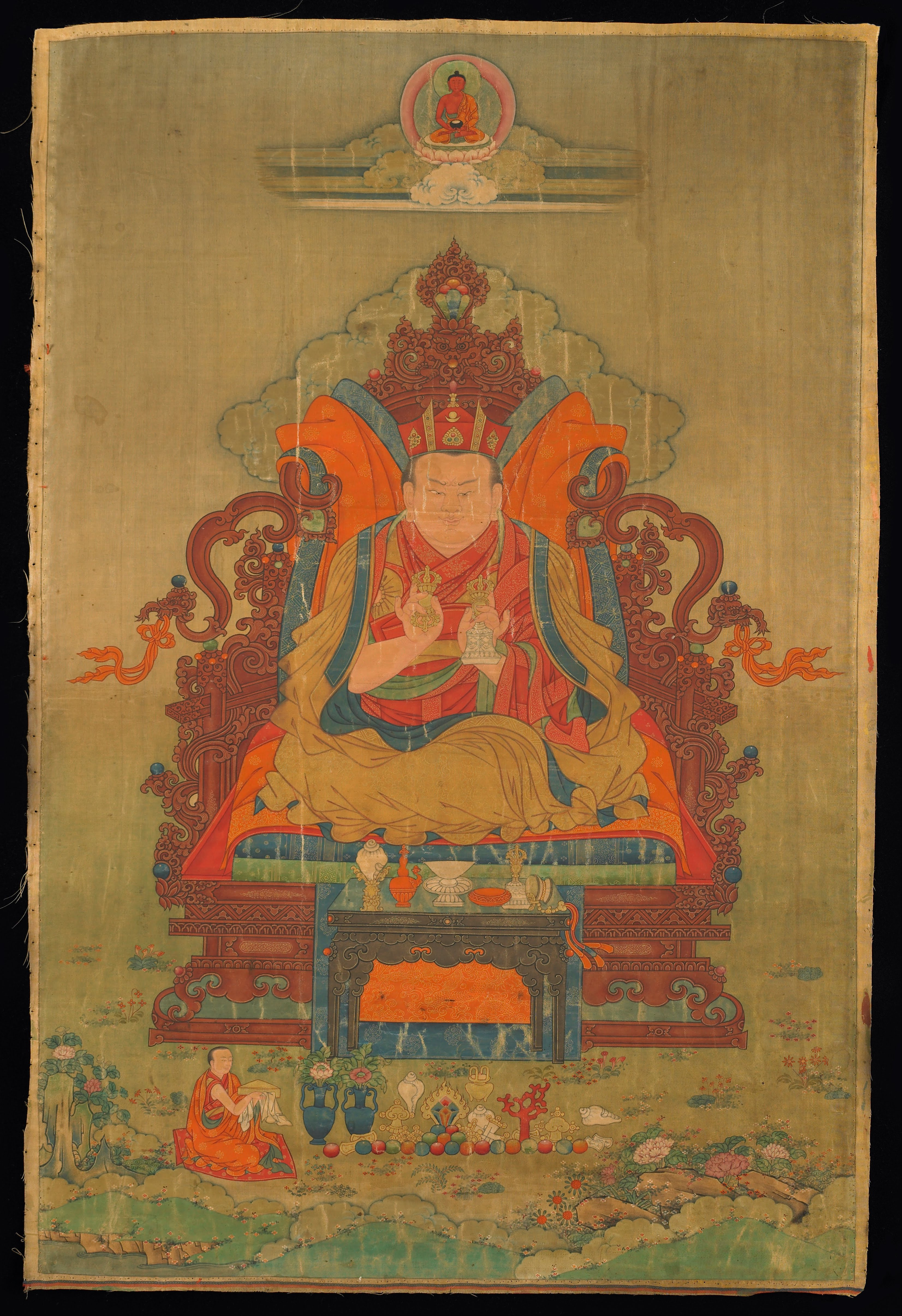
Lobsang Palden Yeshe's brother, Mipam Chodrup Gyatso, the Tenth Shamarpa

Lobsang Palden Yeshe (1738–1780) (Tibetan: བློ་བཟང་དཔལ་ལྡན་ཡེ་ཤེས་, Wylie: Blo-bzang dPal-ldan Ye-shes, ZYPY: Lobsang Baidain Yêxê) was the sixth Panchen Lama of Tashilhunpo Monastery in Tibet. He was the elder stepbrother of the 10th Shamarpa, Mipam Chödrup Gyamtso (1742–1793).

The Panchen Lama was distinguished by his writings and interest in the world. In 1762 he gave the Eighth Dalai Lama his pre-novice ordination at the Potala Palace and named him Jamphel Gyatso.

He befriended George Bogle, a Scottish adventurer and diplomat who had made an expedition to Tibet and stayed at Tashilhunpo Monastery in Shigatse from 1774-1775. He negotiated with Warren Hastings, the Governor of India, through Bogle. The Rājā of Bhutan invaded Cooch Behar (in the plains of Bengal - neighboring British India), in 1772 and Palden Yelde, tutor to the young Dalai Lama at the time, helped arbitrate the negotiations.

He also had dealings with Lama Changkya Hutukhtu, Counsellor of the Emperor of China and chief advisor on Tibetan affairs, about speculations that the Chinese god of war and patron of the Chinese dynasty, Guandi (Kuan-ti), was identical with Gesar, the hero of Tibet's main epic story, who was prophesied to return from Shambhala to Tibet to help it when the country and Buddhism were in difficulties. Others believed Guandi/Gesar was an incarnation of the Panchen Lama. Palden Yeshe wrote a half-mystical book about the road to Shambhala, the Prayer of Shambhala, incorporating real geographical features.

In 1778, the Qianlong Emperor invited Palden Yeshe to Beijing to celebrate his 70th birthday. He left with a huge retinue in 1780 and was greeted along the way by Chinese representatives. To mark the occasion, Qianlong ordered the construction of Xumi Fushou Temple, based on the design of Tashilhunpo Monastery, at the Chengde Mountain Resort. When Palden Yeshe reached Beijing, he was showered with riches and shown the honour normally given to the Dalai Lama. However, he contracted smallpox and died in Beijing on November 2, 1780.

Palden Yeshe's stepbrother, the 10th Shamarpa Mipam Chödrup Gyamtso, had hoped to inherit some of the riches given to his brother in Beijing after his death. When this didn't happen, he conspired with the Nepalese who sent a Gurkha army in 1788 which took control of Shigatse. The Shamarpa, however, did not keep his side of the bargain and the Gurkha army returned three years later to claim their spoils, but the Chinese sent an army to support the Tibetans and drove them back to Nepal in 1792.

The tombs from the Fifth to the Ninth Panchen Lamas were destroyed during the Cultural Revolution and have been rebuilt by the 10th Panchen Lama with a huge tomb at Tashilhunpo Monastery in Shigatse, known as the Tashi Langyar.

Preceded by Lobsang Yeshe	Panchen Lama	Succeeded by Palden Tenpai Nyima
