= Panchen Lama =

Prominent figure in Tibetan Buddhism

Panchen Erdeni (title since 1713)
- Traditional Chinese: 班禪額爾德尼
- Simplified Chinese: 班禅额尔德尼
- Literal meaning: Pandita-Chenpo (Sanskrit-Tibetan Buddhist title, meaning "Great Scholar") + Erdeni (Manchu loanword from Mongolian, meaning "treasure")
Transcriptions
Standard Mandarin
- Hanyu Pinyin: Bānchán É'ěrdéní

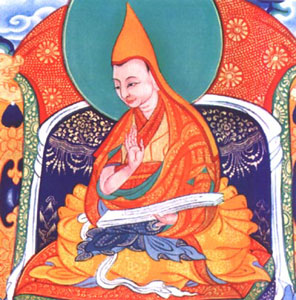
Khedrup Gelek Pelzang, 1st Panchen Lama

The Panchen Lama (Tibetan: པཎ་ཆེན་བླ་མ།, Wylie: paN chen bla ma) is a tulku of the Gelug school of Tibetan Buddhism. The Panchen Lama is one of the most important figures in the Gelug tradition, with its spiritual authority second only to the Dalai Lama. Along with the council of high lamas, he is in charge of seeking out the next Dalai Lama. Panchen is a portmanteau of Pandita and Chenpo, meaning "great scholar".

The recognition of Panchen Lamas began with Lobsang Chökyi Gyaltsen, tutor of the 5th Dalai Lama, who received the title "Panchen Bogd" from Altan Khan and the Dalai Lama in 1645. Bogd is Mongolian, meaning "holy". Khedrup Gelek Pelzang, Sönam Choklang and Ensapa Lobsang Döndrup were subsequently recognized as the first to third Panchen Lamas posthumously.

In 1713, the Kangxi Emperor of the Qing dynasty granted the title Panchen Erdeni to the 5th Panchen Lama. In 1792, the Qianlong Emperor issued a decree known as the 29-Article Ordinance for the More Effective Governing of Tibet, and Article One of the decree was designed to be used in the selection of rinpoches, lamas and other high offices within Tibetan Buddhism, including the Dalai Lamas, Panchen Lamas and Mongolian lamas.

Traditionally, the Panchen Lama is the head of Tashilhunpo Monastery, and holds religious and secular power over the Tsang region centered in Shigatse, independent of the Ganden Podrang authority led by the Dalai Lama. The Dalai Lama and Panchen Lama are closely connected, and each participates in the process of recognizing the other's reincarnations.

== History ==
=== Name ===
The successive Panchen Lamas form a tulku reincarnation lineage which are said to be the incarnations of Amitābha. The title, meaning "Great Scholar", is a Tibetan contraction of the Sanskrit paṇḍita (scholar) and the Tibetan chenpo (great). The Panchen Lama traditionally lived in Tashilhunpo Monastery in Shigatse. From the name of this monastery, the Europeans referred to the Panchen Lama as the Tashi-Lama (also spelled Tesho-Lama or Teshu-Lama).

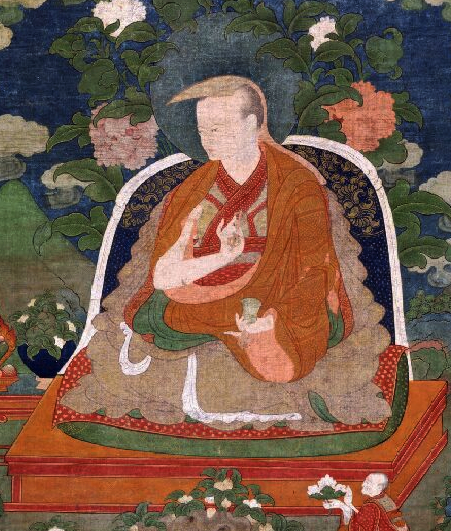
3rd Panchen lama, b.1505 – d.1556

Other titles of Panchen Lama include "Panchen Bogd", the original title given by Altan Khan at the creation of the lineage. "Bogd" (Mongolian: ᠪᠣᠭᠳᠠ, Russian богд) is a Mongolian word meaning "holy, saint". In 1713, the 5th Panchen Lama Lobsang Yeshe received the title "Panchen Erdeni" from the Kangxi Emperor of the Qing Dynasty, which has been inherited by successive Panchen Lamas since then. "Erdeni", or "Erdini", (Manchu: ᡝᡵᡩᡝᠨᡳ erdeni) is Manchu, meaning "treasure".

=== First Panchen Lama ===
Lobsang Chökyi Gyaltsen (1570–1662), was the first Panchen Lama to be accorded this title during his lifetime. He was the tutor and a close ally of the 5th Dalai Lama, "The Great Fifth", as he is known, pronounced the Panchen to be an incarnation of the celestial buddha Amitābha.

The 5th Dalai Lama requested the Panchen to accept Tashilhunpo Monastery, built by the 1st Dalai Lama, as his multi-lifetime seat for future incarnations. Since then, every incarnation of the Panchen Lama has been the master of Tashilhunpo Monastery and it is there that they have all received their education and their mummified bodies were enshrined.

When Lobsang Chökyi Gyaltsen died in 1662, the fifth Dalai Lama commenced the tradition of searching for his next incarnation. He also reserved the traditional title of Panchen which had previously been a courtesy title for all exceptionally learned lamas – exclusively for his successors. Khedrub Je, Sönam Choklang and Ensapa Lobsang Döndrup were posthumously decided by the 5th Dalai Lama to have been a previous incarnation of Lobsang Chökyi Gyaltsen, 4th Panchen Lama (1570–1662). Traditionally, there were considered to be four Indian and three Tibetan incarnations before Khedrup, starting with Subhuti, one of the original disciples of Gautama Buddha. Gö Lotsawa is considered to be the first Tibetan incarnation of Amitabha in this line. The recognition of Panchen Lamas has always been a matter involving the Dalai Lama. Choekyi Gyaltsen, 10th Panchen Lama, himself declared, as cited by an official Chinese review that "according to Tibetan tradition, the confirmation of either the Dalai or Panchen must be mutually recognized." The involvement of the government of China in this affair is seen by some as a political ploy to try to gain control over the recognition of the next Dalai Lama (see below), and to strengthen their hold over the future of Tibet and its governance. The government claims however, that their involvement does not break with tradition in that the final decision about the recognition of both the Dalai Lama and the Panchen Lama traditionally rested in the hands of the Chinese emperor. For instance, after 1792, the Golden Urn was thought to have been used in selecting the 10th, 11th and 12th Dalai Lamas; but the 14th Dalai Lama, Tenzin Gyatso, has more recently said that this was only really used in selection of the 11th, and that in the other cases it was only used to humour the Chinese to confirm a selection that had already been made by traditional methods.

=== Modern times ===
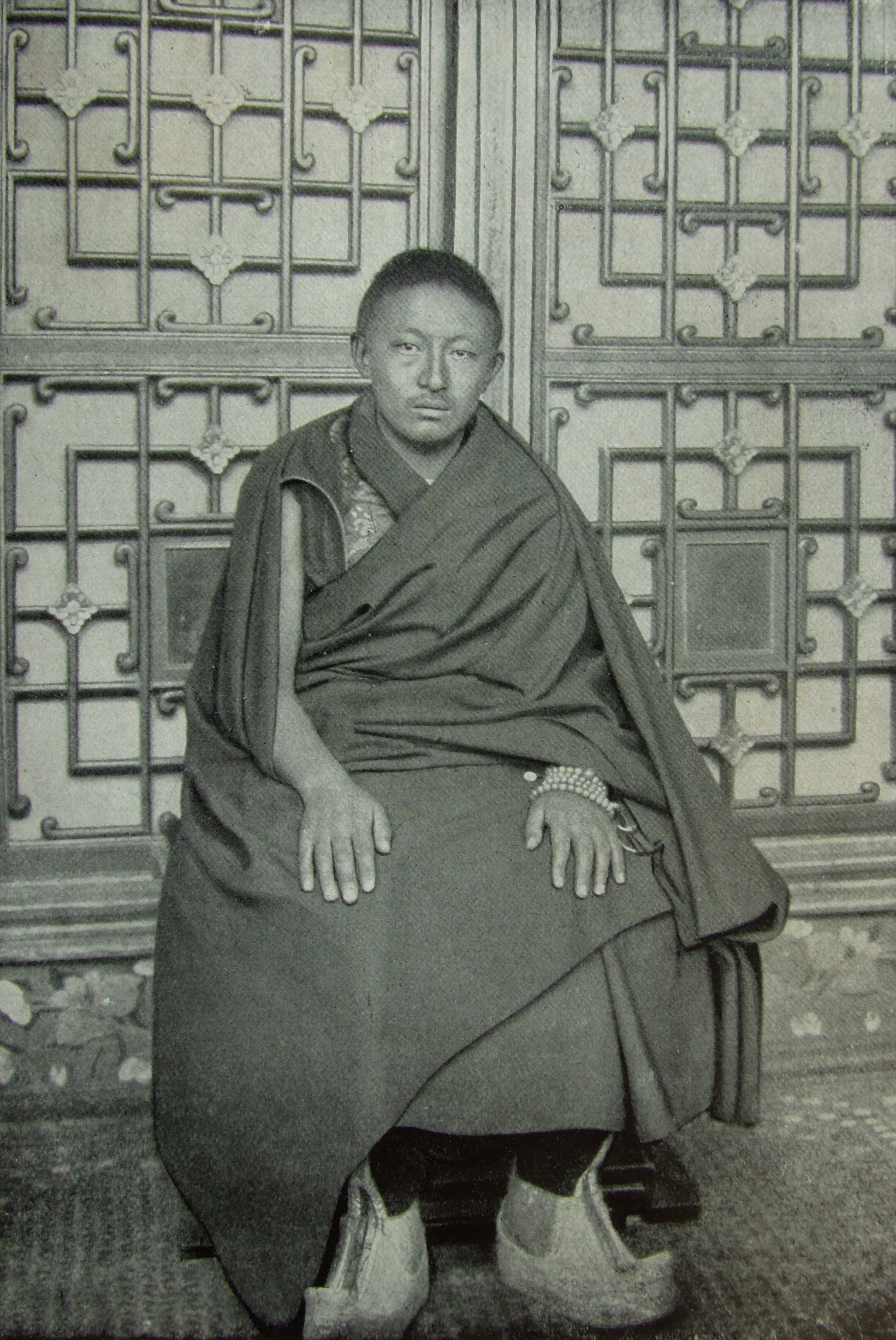
9th Panchen Lama, Thubten Choekyi Nyima taken 1907 by Sven Hedin. Published in his 1922 book "Trans-himalaya"

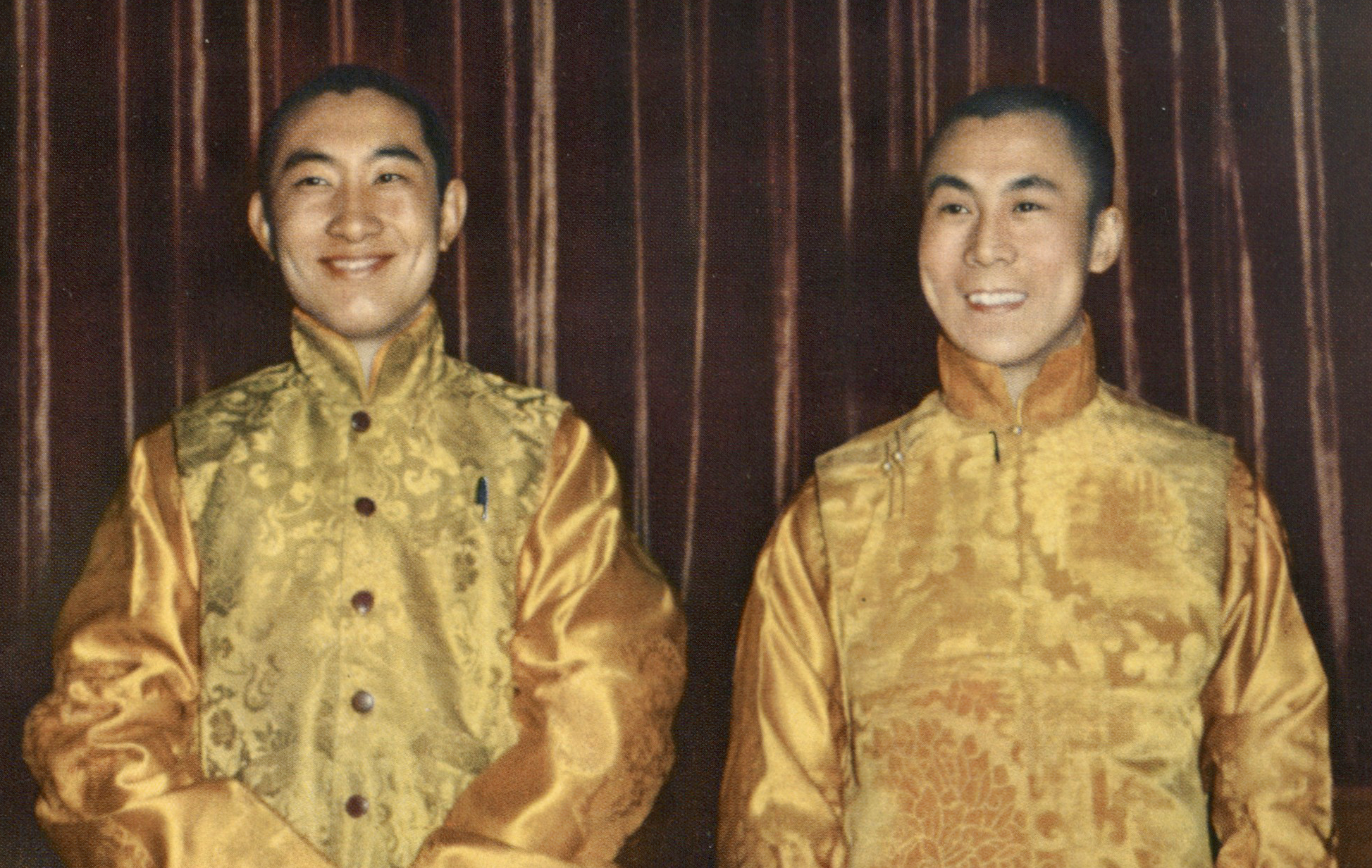
The 14th Dalai Lama (right) and the 10th Panchen Lama (left), 1954.

In 1924, the thirteenth Dalai Lama prohibited the 9th Panchen Lama's followers from holding any office in the Central Tibetan government and imprisoned them in Lhasa, prompting the Panchen Lama to flee to Inner Mongolia, China. The Dalai Lama was attempting to collect revenue from the Panchen Lama's estate to cover Tibet's military expenses, and to reduce the power of the Panchen Lama. In China, the ninth Panchen Lama worked on plans to develop Tibet. He also held a position in the Mongolian and Tibetan Affairs Commission, and was considered extremely "pro-Chinese". There, he adopted the ideas of Sun Yatsen through revolutionary Pandatsang Rapga of the Tibet Improvement Party.

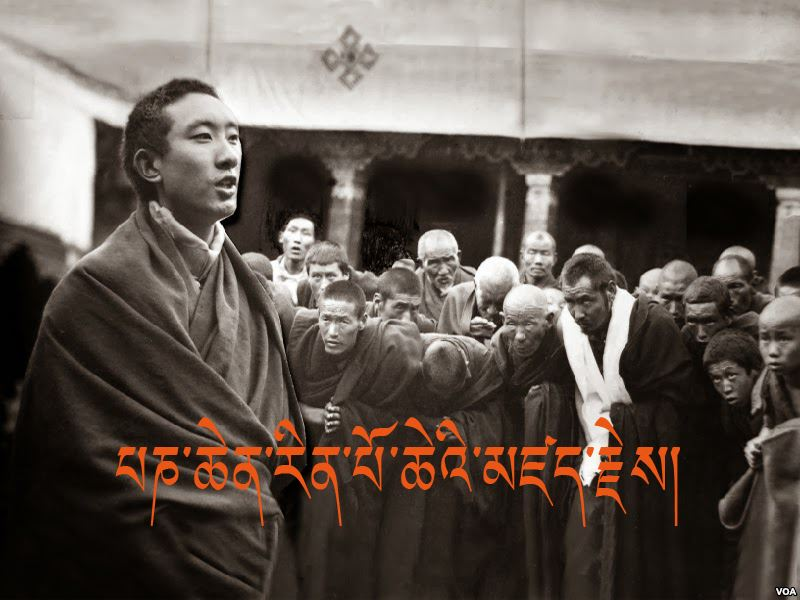
10th Panchen Lama in 1959

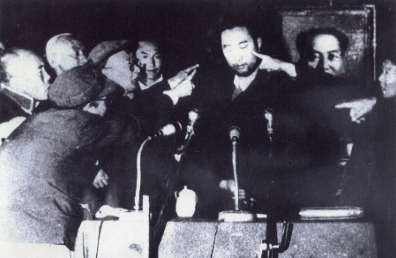
10th Panchen Lama during a struggle session in 1964, before his imprisonment

When the Ninth Panchen Lama died in 1937, two simultaneous searches for the tenth Panchen Lama produced two competing candidates, with the Dalai Lama's officials selecting a boy from Xikang and the Panchen Lama's officials picking Gonpo Tseten. The Republic of China government, then embroiled in the Chinese Civil War, declared its support for Tseten on 3 June 1949. Chinese Nationalist governor Ma Bufang allowed Kumbum Monastery to be totally self-governed by Tseten, now called Gyaltsen, while the 14th Dalai Lama's government refused to recognize him.

The 10th Panchen Lama sought revenge on the Dalai Lama by leading an army against him, and requested aid from Ma Bufang in September 1949. However, the Chinese Nationalist government, facing defeat from the communists, requested the Panchen Lama's help instead. They formulated a plan where three Khampa divisions would be led by the Panchen Lama as a broad anti-Communist base in Southwest China, but the Panchen Lama decided to defect to the Communists instead. The Panchen Lama, unlike the Dalai Lama, sought to exert control in decision making.

The Panchen Lama initially supported Communist policies for Tibet. Radio Beijing broadcast the religious leader's call for Tibet to be liberated by the PRC, which created pressure on the Lhasa government to negotiate with the People's Republic. He also called on Tibetans to support the Chinese government." However in 1962, he wrote the 70,000 Character Petition detailing abuses of power in Tibet and discussed it with Premier Zhou Enlai. In 1964, he was imprisoned and forced to undergo struggle sessions. In October 1977, he was released but held under house arrest in 1982. In 1979, he married a Han Chinese woman and in 1983 they had a daughter. In 1989, the tenth Panchen Lama died suddenly in Shigatse at the age of 51 shortly after giving a speech criticizing the excesses of the Cultural Revolution in Tibet but praising the reform and opening up of the 1980s. His daughter is Yabshi Pan Rinzinwangmo, better known as "Renji".

The Dalai Lama named Gedhun Choekyi Nyima as the 11th incarnation of the Panchen Lama on 14 May 1995. The Chinese government insisted that the 11th Panchen Lama has to be chosen via the golden urn. In selecting a name, lottery numbers were drawn from the Golden Urn. Chinese authorities named Gyancain Norbu as the search committee's choice on 11 November 1995. Gedhun Choekyi Nyima has not been observed by an independent party since 17 May 1995. The Chinese government claims he is living a "normal private life". Tibetans and human rights groups continue to campaign for his release.

== Relation to the Dalai Lama lineage ==
The Panchen Lama bears part of the responsibility of the monk-regent for finding the incarnation of the Dalai Lama, and vice versa. This has been the tradition since the 5th Dalai Lama recognized his teacher Lobsang Choekyi Gyaltsen as the Panchen Lama of Tashilhunpo. With this appointment, Lobsang Choekyi Gyaltsen's three previous incarnations were posthumously recognised as Panchen Lamas. The "Great Fifth" also recognized Lobsang Yeshe, 5th Panchen Lama. The 7th Dalai Lama recognized Lobsang Palden Yeshe, 6th Panchen Lama, who in turn recognized the 8th Dalai Lama. Similarly, the Eighth Dalai Lama recognised Palden Tenpai Nyima, 7th Panchen Lama. The current 14th Dalai Lama was first found by the 9th Panchen Lama when he was living in the Kumbum Monastery. In February 1937, the Panchen Lama informed his investigation to the Tibetan government's representatives, who would later confirm the new Dalai Lama's identity. On 26 January 1940, the Regent Reting Rinpoche requested the Central Government to exempt Tenzin Gyatso from lot-drawing process using Golden Urn to become the 14th Dalai Lama. The request was approved by the Central Government.

== Political significance ==
Monastic figures had historically held important roles in the social makeup of Tibet, and though these roles have diminished since 1959, many Tibetans continue to regard the Panchen Lama as a significant political, as well as spiritual figure due to the role he traditionally plays in selecting the next Dalai Lama. The political significance of the role is also utilized by the Chinese state. Tibetan support groups such as London-based Free Tibet have argued that the Chinese government seeks to install its own choice of Dalai Lama when Tenzin Gyatso, the current Dalai Lama, dies and that for this reason the Dalai Lama's choice of Panchen Lama, Gedhun Choekyi Nyima went missing at the age of six, to be replaced by the Chinese state's choice, Gyaincain Norbu. It is suggested that the Chinese government may give the title of Dalai Lama to the son of a loyal ethnic Tibetan Communist party member and it will pressure Western governments to recognize its boy, and not the boy chosen by Lamas in India, as the head of Tibetan Buddhism.

In October 2025, a Kalachakra empowerment was conducted by Gyaincain Norbu, the Panchen Lama recognized by the Chinese government, at Tashi Lhunpo Monastery in Shigatse. Sources indicated that attendance may have been encouraged or facilitated by PRC authorities. The event was seen as part of ongoing efforts by the Chinese government to promote Gyaincain Norbu's religious role within Tibetan Buddhism. Chinese state media emphasized his official roles and described the event as a significant tantric ritual. Exiled Tibetan sources claim that local Tibetans were compelled to attend despite the harvest season. The second such ceremony, following one in 2016, was viewed as attempts to legitimize his position. His appointment remains disputed, as the Dalai Lama had recognized Gedhun Choekyi Nyima – missing since 1995 – as the 11th Panchen Lama.

== See also ==
- List of Panchen Lamas
- Tashilhunpo Monastery
- History of Tibet
- Choekyi Gyaltsen
- Tibet since 1950
- 11th Panchen Lama controversy
