= Wang Qiang (composer) =

Chinese composer

Wang Qiang (Chinese: 王强; pinyin: Wáng Qiáng, born 1935 in Shandong) is a Chinese composer.

== Biography ==
Wang Qiang began her study of composition at the Shanghai Conservatory of Music in 1955. As a third-year student she won first prize in the 1959 World Youth Music Composition Competition with the choral piece River of Fortune. After graduating in 1960, she took a position teaching composition at the same school. She continued to work at the Conservatory until 1991, when she moved to live and work in Hong Kong.

== Works ==
Wang Qiang composes for orchestra, chamber ensemble, operetta, choral ensemble and film and television scores. Selected works include:

Orchestral Works:

- Ga Da Mei Ling (嘎達梅林) for Cello and Orchestra, 1960
- La Ba and Gu (喇叭與鼓) for Orchestra, 1980
- Overture - Aspiration (序曲﹣希望) for Orchestra, 1992
- Fantay Overture (幻想序曲) “ Love ” (愛) for Orchestra, 1993
- Violin Concerto No. 0 (小提琴協奏曲 零號) for violin and Orchestra, 1998
- Passacaglia (帕薩卡里亞) for Orchestra, 2002

Chamber Music:

- Trio (三重奏) for Flute, Viola and Arpa, 1979
- Cello Octet (八重奏) Twelve pieces for Eight cellists, 1989
- Cello and Contrabass (二重奏) Five pieces, 1989
- Quartet (箏四重奏) For four Zhengs, Twelve pieces, 1990
- Trio (三重奏) Two pieces, for Flute, Zheng and Erhu, 1991
- Untitled (無題) for Flute, Cello and Percussion, 1995
- Flower (花兒) for Soprano, String Quartet and Guitar, 2003
- Erhu and String Quartet (二胡和弦樂四重奏) Spring, Summer, Autumn, Winter, for Erhu and String Quartet, 2006
- Celestial dream dance (夢幻舞曲) for Flute, Clarinet and Percussion, 2006

Choral Music:

- River of Fortune (混聲大合唱) for Choral and Orchestra, 1958
- Chinese Folk song Choral (中國民歌合唱曲三首) Three pieces for Choir and Piano, 2003

Film Scores:

- Waiting for Tomorrow (等明天) for Film and Orchestra, 1962
- Mysteries of Bao Hu Lu for Film and Orchestra, 1963
- The dawn (曙光) for Film and Orchestra, 1979
- Girl's Sale Cake (賣大餅的姑娘) for TV play and Orchestra, 1980
