= Lobsang Chökyi Gyaltsen, 4th Panchen Lama =

Lobsang Chökyi Gyaltsen
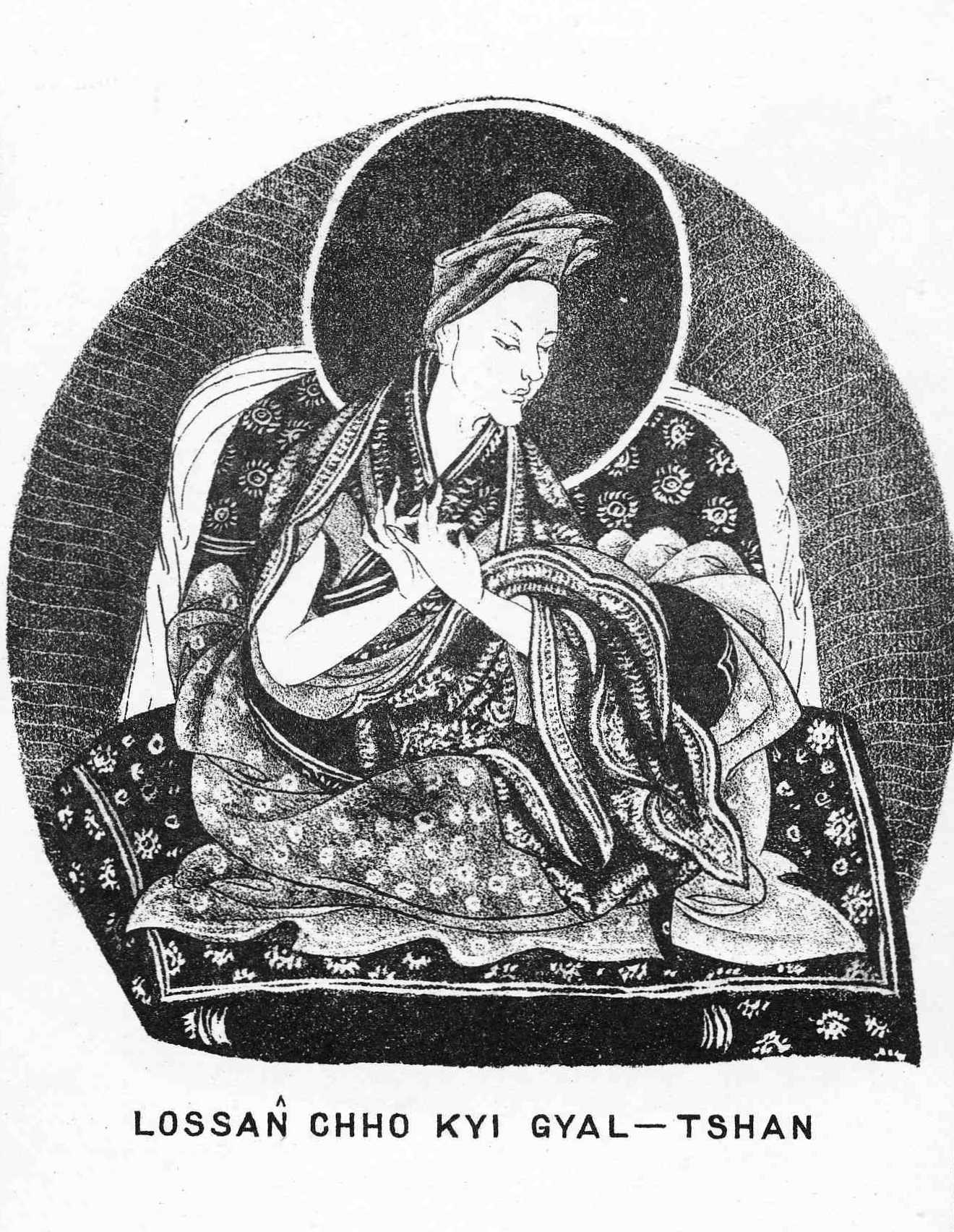
- Born: 1570
- Died: 1662 (aged 91–92)

Losang Chö kyi Gyaltsen (Tibetan: བློ་བཟང་ཆོས་ཀྱི་རྒྱལ་མཚན་, Wylie: blo bzang chos kyi rgyal mtshan) (1570–1662) was the fourth Panchen Lama of the Gelug school of Tibetan Buddhism and the first to be accorded this title during his lifetime.

Losang Chö kyi Gyaltsen was the teacher and close ally of the 5th Dalai Lama, called "the Great". The "Great Fifth" gave him Tashilhunpo Monastery as a living place and declared him to be an incarnation of Amitābha, and since then, every Panchen Lama has been the master of Tashilhunpo.

When Losang Chö kyi Gyaltsen died in 1662, aged 91 or 92, the Fifth Dalai Lama began the tradition of recognising his reincarnation. He composed a special prayer asking his master to return and ordered the monks of the great monasteries to recite it. He also reserved the title of Panchen (short for Pandita chen po or 'Great Scholar'), which had previously been a courtesy title for all learned lamas, exclusively for him, and this title has continued to be given to his successors and, posthumously, to his predecessors starting with Khedrup Gelek Pelzang, 1st Panchen Lama.

The 4th Panchen Lama was a prolific writer and teacher, composing more than three hundred works. He wrote a root Mahamudra text on the "Highway of the Conquerors: Root Verses for the Precious Geden [Gelug] Kagyu [Oral] Transmission of Mahāmudrā" (dGe-ldan bka'-brgyud rin-po-che'i phyag-chen rtsa-ba rgyal-ba'i gzhung-lam) and its auto commentary (the Yang gsal sgron me, "Lamp re-illuminating Mahamudra"), which is still widely taught and commented upon. Before this work, Gelug writings on Mahamudra tended to follow orthodox Kagyu teachings. This text and its auto commentary have become a central work on Mahamudra in the Gelug school. The current 14th Dalai Lama and Lama Yeshe are some of the modern Gelug figures which have written commentaries on this key Gelug Mahamudra text.

Preceded by Ensapa Lobsang Döndrup	Panchen Lama	Succeeded by Lobsang Yeshe
