= Horqin Left Middle Banner =

District of Inner Mongolia, China

Horqin Left Middle Banner 科尔沁左翼中旗 • ᠬᠣᠷᠴᠢᠨ ᠵᠡᠭᠦᠨ ᠭᠠᠷᠤᠨ ᠳᠤᠮᠳᠠᠳᠤ ᠬᠣᠰᠢᠭᠤ
- Banner
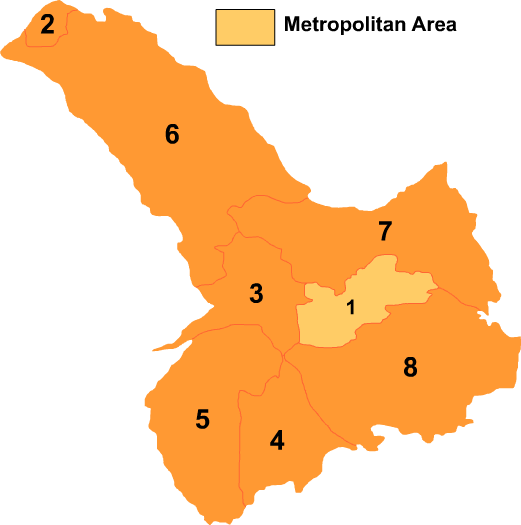
- Tongliao divisions map: Horqin Left Middle Banner is 7 on this map

- Location of the seat in Inner Mongolia Horqin LMB (China)
- Coordinates: 44°08′N 123°19′E
- Country: China
- Autonomous region: Inner Mongolia
- Prefecture-level city: Tongliao
- Banner seat: Baokang Town

Area
  - Total: 9,590 km^{2} (3,700 sq mi)
- Elevation: 147 m (482 ft)

Population (2020)
  - Total: 399,631
  - Density: 41.7/km^{2} (108/sq mi)
- Time zone: UTC+8 (China Standard)
- Division code: HZZ
- Website: www.kzzq.gov.cn

Horqin Left Middle Banner

Chinese name
- Simplified Chinese: 科尔沁左翼中旗
- Traditional Chinese: 科爾沁左翼中旗
Transcriptions
Standard Mandarin
- Hanyu Pinyin: Kē'ěrqìn Zuǒyì Zhōngqí

Mongolian name
- Mongolian Cyrillic: Хорчин зүүн гарын дунд хошуу
- Mongolian script: ᠬᠣᠷᠴᠢᠨ ᠵᠡᠭᠦᠨ ᠭᠠᠷᠤᠨ ᠳᠤᠮᠳᠠᠳᠤ ᠬᠣᠰᠢᠭᠤ
Transcriptions
- SASM/GNC: Qorčin Jegün Ɣarun Dumdadu qosiɣu

Horqin Left Middle Banner (Mongolian: ᠬᠣᠷᠴᠢᠨ ᠵᠡᠭᠦᠨ ᠭᠠᠷᠤᠨ ᠳᠤᠮᠳᠠᠳᠤ ᠬᠣᠰᠢᠭᠤ; Chinese: 科尔沁左翼中旗), formerly known as Darhan Banner (Mongolian: Дархан хошуу), is a banner of eastern Inner Mongolia, China, bordering Jilin province to the east. It is under the administration of Tongliao City, 101 kilometres (63 mi) to the southwest. The local Mongolian dialect is Khorchin Mongolian.

== Demographics ==
The proportion of nationalities in Horqin Left Middle Banner (2020)
Nationality	Percentage
Mongols	72.7%
Han	25.7%
Manchus	1.3%
Others	0.3%
Source of the population statistics :

== Administrative divisions ==
Horqin Left Middle Banner is made up of 1 subdistrict, 11 towns, 1 township, 5 sums, and 3 farms and pastures.

Name	Simplified Chinese	Hanyu Pinyin	Mongolian (Hudum Script)	Mongolian (Cyrillic)	Administrative division code
Subdistrict
Baokang Subdistrict	保康街道	Bǎokāng Jiēdào Bànshìchù	ᠪᠠᠯᠭᠠᠰᠤ ᠵᠡᠭᠡᠯᠢ ᠭᠤᠳᠤᠮᠵᠢ	Балгас зээл гудамж	150521403
Towns
Baokang Town	保康镇	Bǎokāng Zhèn	ᠪᠣᠣ ᠺᠠᠩ ᠪᠠᠯᠭᠠᠰᠤ	Буу кан балгас	150521100
Baolongshan Town	宝龙山镇	Bǎolóngshān Zhèn	ᠪᠣᠣ ᠯᠦᠩ ᠱᠠᠨ ᠪᠠᠯᠭᠠᠰᠤ	Буу лүн шин балгас	150521101
Xebert Town	舍伯吐镇	Shěbótǔ Zhèn	ᠱᠧᠪᠡᠷᠲᠦ ᠪᠠᠯᠭᠠᠰᠤ	Шеэвэрт балгас	150521102
Bayan Tal Town	巴彦塔拉镇	Bāyàntǎlā Zhèn	ᠪᠠᠶᠠᠨᠲᠠᠯ᠎ᠠ ᠪᠠᠯᠭᠠᠰᠤ	Баянтал балгас	150521103
Mend Town	门达镇	Méndá Zhèn	ᠮᠡᠨᠳᠦ ᠪᠠᠯᠭᠠᠰᠤ	Мэнд балгас	150521104
Jamt Town	架玛吐镇	Jiàmǎtǔ Zhèn	ᠵᠠᠮᠲᠤ ᠪᠠᠯᠭᠠᠰᠤ	Замт балгас	150521105
Yolon Mod Town	腰林毛都镇	Yāolínmáodū Zhèn	ᠶᠣᠯᠣ ᠶᠢᠨ ᠮᠣᠳᠣ ᠪᠠᠯᠭᠠᠰᠤ	Ёлын Мод балгас	150521106
Xibe Hua Town	希伯花镇	Xībóhuā Zhèn	ᠰᠢᠪᠡᠭᠡᠬᠤᠸᠠ ᠪᠠᠯᠭᠠᠰᠤ	Шивээ-Хуа балгас	150521107
Hua Tugal Town	花吐古拉镇	Huātǔgǔlā Zhèn	ᠬᠤᠸᠠᠲᠤᠭᠤᠯ ᠪᠠᠯᠭᠠᠰᠤ	Хуатугал балгас	150521108
Dalj Town	代力吉镇	Dàilìjí Zhèn	ᠳᠠᠯᠵᠢ ᠪᠠᠯᠭᠠᠰᠤ	Далж балгас	150521109
Nuram Town	努日木镇	Nǔrìmù Zhèn	ᠨᠠᠭᠤᠷᠮ᠎ᠠ ᠪᠠᠯᠭᠠᠰᠤ	Нуурам балгас	150521110
Township
Shengli Township	胜利乡	Shènglì Xiāng	ᠱᠧᠩ ᠯᠢ ᠰᠢᠶᠠᠩ	Шен ли шиян	150521205
Sums
Hua Huxu Sum	花胡硕苏木	Huāhúshuò Sūmù	ᠬᠤᠸᠠᠬᠤᠰᠢᠭᠤ ᠰᠤᠮᠤ	Хуахошуу сум	150521200
Xidai Sum	协代苏木	Xiédài Sūmù	ᠰᠢᠳᠠᠢ ᠰᠤᠮᠤ	Шатай сум	150521201
Baixingt Sum	白兴吐苏木	Báixīngtǔ Sūmù	ᠪᠠᠢᠰᠢᠩᠲᠤ ᠰᠤᠮᠤ	Байшингт сум	150521202
Tubxin Sum	图布信苏木	Túbùxìn Sūmù	ᠲᠦᠪᠰᠢᠨ ᠰᠤᠮᠤ	Түвшин сум	150521203
Obo Sum	敖包苏木	Áobāo Sūmù	ᠣᠪᠣᠭ᠎ᠠ ᠰᠤᠮᠤ	Овоо сум	150521204
Others
Bayan Tal Farm	白音塔拉农场	Báiyīntǎlā Nóngchǎng	ᠪᠠᠶᠠᠨᠲᠠᠯ᠎ᠠ ᠲᠠᠷᠢᠶᠠᠯᠠᠩ ᠤᠨ ᠲᠠᠯᠠᠪᠠᠢ	Баянтал тариалангийн талбай	150521400
Jurh Pasture	珠日河牧场	Zhūrìhé Mùchǎng	ᠵᠢᠷᠦᠭᠡ ᠮᠠᠯᠵᠢᠯ ᠤᠨ ᠲᠠᠯᠠᠪᠠᠢ	Зүрх малжлын талбай	150521401
Fengku Pasture	丰库牧场	Fēngkù Mùchǎng	ᠹᠧᠩ ᠺᠦ᠋ ᠮᠠᠯᠵᠢᠯ ᠤᠨ ᠲᠠᠯᠠᠪᠠᠢ	Фен кү малжлын талбай	150521402

== Climate ==
Climate data for Horqin Left Middle Banner, elevation 141 m (463 ft), (1991–2020 normals, extremes 1981–2010)
Month	Jan	Feb	Mar	Apr	May	Jun	Jul	Aug	Sep	Oct	Nov	Dec	Year
Record high °C (°F)	6.0 (42.8)	15.9 (60.6)	22.2 (72.0)	32.5 (90.5)	35.5 (95.9)	39.0 (102.2)	37.5 (99.5)	37.6 (99.7)	34.9 (94.8)	28.4 (83.1)	19.8 (67.6)	13.5 (56.3)	39.0 (102.2)
Mean daily maximum °C (°F)	−8.1 (17.4)	−2.4 (27.7)	5.8 (42.4)	15.8 (60.4)	23.2 (73.8)	27.9 (82.2)	29.6 (85.3)	28.1 (82.6)	23.4 (74.1)	14.5 (58.1)	2.6 (36.7)	−6.3 (20.7)	12.8 (55.1)
Daily mean °C (°F)	−14.7 (5.5)	−9.4 (15.1)	−0.9 (30.4)	9.1 (48.4)	16.8 (62.2)	22.1 (71.8)	24.5 (76.1)	22.7 (72.9)	16.7 (62.1)	7.7 (45.9)	−3.5 (25.7)	−12.4 (9.7)	6.6 (43.8)
Mean daily minimum °C (°F)	−20.0 (−4.0)	−15.5 (4.1)	−7.2 (19.0)	2.1 (35.8)	10.2 (50.4)	16.3 (61.3)	19.8 (67.6)	17.9 (64.2)	10.6 (51.1)	2.0 (35.6)	−8.5 (16.7)	−17.3 (0.9)	0.9 (33.6)
Record low °C (°F)	−35.9 (−32.6)	−33.9 (−29.0)	−22.5 (−8.5)	−10.6 (12.9)	−1.4 (29.5)	4.3 (39.7)	10.7 (51.3)	6.7 (44.1)	−1.1 (30.0)	−13.6 (7.5)	−24.9 (−12.8)	−33.4 (−28.1)	−35.9 (−32.6)
Average precipitation mm (inches)	1.6 (0.06)	1.7 (0.07)	5.8 (0.23)	12.9 (0.51)	44.5 (1.75)	74.3 (2.93)	98.7 (3.89)	91.5 (3.60)	34.2 (1.35)	20.6 (0.81)	6.9 (0.27)	2.5 (0.10)	395.2 (15.57)
Average precipitation days (≥ 0.1 mm)	2.1	1.6	3.0	3.9	7.6	10.6	11.1	9.8	6.8	4.3	3.0	2.9	66.7
Average snowy days	3.9	2.6	3.8	1.3	0.1	0	0	0	0	0.8	3.5	4.9	20.9
Average relative humidity (%)	60	51	44	40	46	59	72	73	63	56	57	61	57
Mean monthly sunshine hours	207.5	221.6	258.2	253.0	265.7	248.5	235.2	239.6	241.4	228.3	192.2	187.3	2,778.5
Percentage possible sunshine	72	74	69	62	58	54	50	56	65	68	67	68	64
Source: China Meteorological Administration

Climate data for Shebotu Town, Horqin Left Middle Banner (1991–2020 normals)
Month	Jan	Feb	Mar	Apr	May	Jun	Jul	Aug	Sep	Oct	Nov	Dec	Year
Mean daily maximum °C (°F)	−6.8 (19.8)	−1.3 (29.7)	6.7 (44.1)	16.5 (61.7)	24.0 (75.2)	28.4 (83.1)	30.1 (86.2)	28.6 (83.5)	24.0 (75.2)	15.0 (59.0)	3.2 (37.8)	−5.3 (22.5)	13.6 (56.5)
Daily mean °C (°F)	−13.5 (7.7)	−8.6 (16.5)	−0.4 (31.3)	9.5 (49.1)	17.4 (63.3)	22.4 (72.3)	24.6 (76.3)	22.8 (73.0)	16.8 (62.2)	8.0 (46.4)	−3.2 (26.2)	−11.6 (11.1)	7.0 (44.6)
Mean daily minimum °C (°F)	−18.9 (−2.0)	−14.6 (5.7)	−7.0 (19.4)	2.5 (36.5)	10.6 (51.1)	16.3 (61.3)	19.4 (66.9)	17.5 (63.5)	10.3 (50.5)	2.0 (35.6)	−8.4 (16.9)	−16.6 (2.1)	1.1 (34.0)
Average precipitation mm (inches)	0.9 (0.04)	1.0 (0.04)	4.3 (0.17)	12.3 (0.48)	34.4 (1.35)	62.2 (2.45)	88.6 (3.49)	63.6 (2.50)	28.2 (1.11)	17.2 (0.68)	4.8 (0.19)	1.8 (0.07)	319.3 (12.57)
Average precipitation days (≥ 0.1 mm)	1.5	1.2	2.2	4.1	7.5	10.7	11.1	8.5	6.3	3.6	2.1	2.4	61.2
Average snowy days	2.7	2.1	3.0	1.0	0	0	0	0	0	1.0	2.5	3.6	15.9
Average relative humidity (%)	54	45	39	36	42	57	70	72	60	51	52	57	53
Mean monthly sunshine hours	214.7	223.5	266.1	256.4	269.5	246.0	233.6	234.7	242.3	234.5	193.9	197.7	2,812.9
Percentage possible sunshine	74	75	72	63	59	53	50	55	65	70	68	72	65
Source: China Meteorological Administration
