= Tashi Lhunpo Monastery =

Tibetan Buddhist monastery in Shigatse, Tibet, China

Tashi Lhunpo
- Tibetan transcription(s); Tibetan: བཀྲ་ཤིས་ལྷུན་པོ་ Wylie transliteration: bkra shis lhun po Pronunciation in IPA: [ʈáɕi l̥ympo] Official transcription (China): Zhaxi Lhünbo; THL: Trashi Lhünpo; Other transcriptions: Tashi Lhunpo, Tashi Lhümpo; Chinese transcription(s); Traditional: 扎什倫布寺; Simplified: 扎什伦布寺; Pinyin: Zhāshí Lúnbù Sì
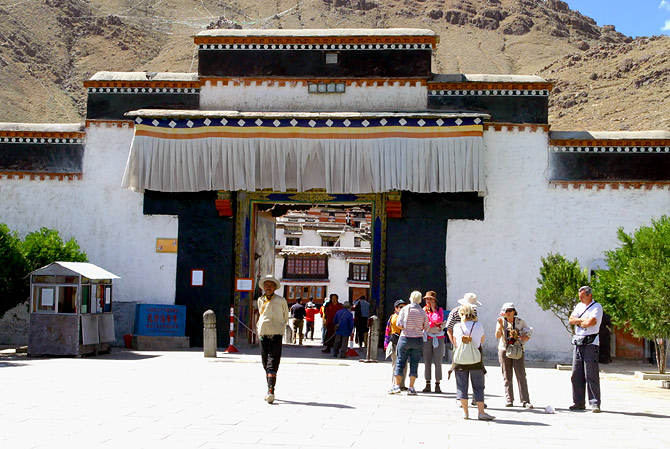
- Entrance to Tashi Lhunpo Monastery

- Location within Tibet Autonomous Region

Religion
- Affiliation: Tibetan Buddhism
- Sect: Gelug

Location
- Location: Shigatse, Tibet Autonomous Region, China
- Country: China
- Coordinates: 29.26861°N 88.869940°E

Architecture
- Founder: 1st Dalai Lama
- Established: 1447; 579 years ago
- Completed: 1447

Tashi Lhunpo Monastery (Tibetan: བཀྲ་ཤིས་ལྷུན་པོ་) is an historically and culturally important monastery in Shigatse, the second-largest city in Tibet. Founded in 1447 by the 1st Dalai Lama, it is the traditional monastic seat of the Panchen Lama.

The monastery was sacked in 1791, when the Gorkha Kingdom invaded Tibet and captured Shigatse. A combined Tibetan and Chinese army drove them back as far as the outskirts of Kathmandu, when they were forced to agree to keep the peace in the future, pay tribute every five years, and return what they had looted from Tashi Lhunpo.

The monastery is the traditional seat of successive Panchen Lamas, the second highest ranking tulku lineage in the Gelug tradition of Tibetan Buddhism. The "Tashi" or Panchen Lama had temporal power over three small districts, though not over the town of Shigatse itself, which was administered by a dzongpön (prefect) appointed from Lhasa.

The monastery is located on a hill in the center of Shigatse. Pilgrims circumambulate the monastery on the lingkhor (sacred path) outside the walls.

The full name in Tibetan of the monastery means "all fortune and happiness gathered here" or "heap of glory". Captain Samuel Turner, a British officer with the East India Company who visited the monastery in the late 18th century, described it in the following terms:

If the magnificence of the place was to be increased by any external cause, none could more superbly have adorned its numerous gilded canopies and turrets than the sun rising in full splendour directly opposite. It presented a view wonderfully beautiful and brilliant; the effect was little short of magic, and it made an impression which no time will ever efface from my mind.

Although two-thirds of the buildings were destroyed during the Chinese Cultural Revolution, they were mainly the residences for the 4,000 monks. In 1966 the Red Guards led a crowd to break statues, burn scriptures, and open the stupas containing the relics of the 5th to 9th Panchen Lamas, and throw them in the river. Some of those remains were saved by locals, and in 1985, Choekyi Gyaltsen, 10th Panchen Lama, began the construction of a new stupa to house them and honour his predecessors. It was finally consecrated on 22 January 1989, just six days before he died aged fifty-one at Tashi Lhunpo. "It was as if he was saying now he could rest."

== History ==
The monastery was founded in 1447 CE by Gedun Drub, the disciple of the famous Buddhist philosopher Je Tsongkhapa and later named the First Dalai Lama. The construction was financed by donations from local nobles.

Later Lobsang Chökyi Gyalsten — the Fourth Panchen Lama and the first Panchen Lama to be recognized as such by the rulers of Mongolia — made major expansions to the monastery. Since then, all Panchen Lamas have resided at Tashi Lhunpo, and have managed to expand it gradually.

The 11th Panchen Lama Choekyi Gyalpo, recognized by the Chinese government through the Golden Urn, was enthroned under Chinese supervision at the monastery in November/December 1995.

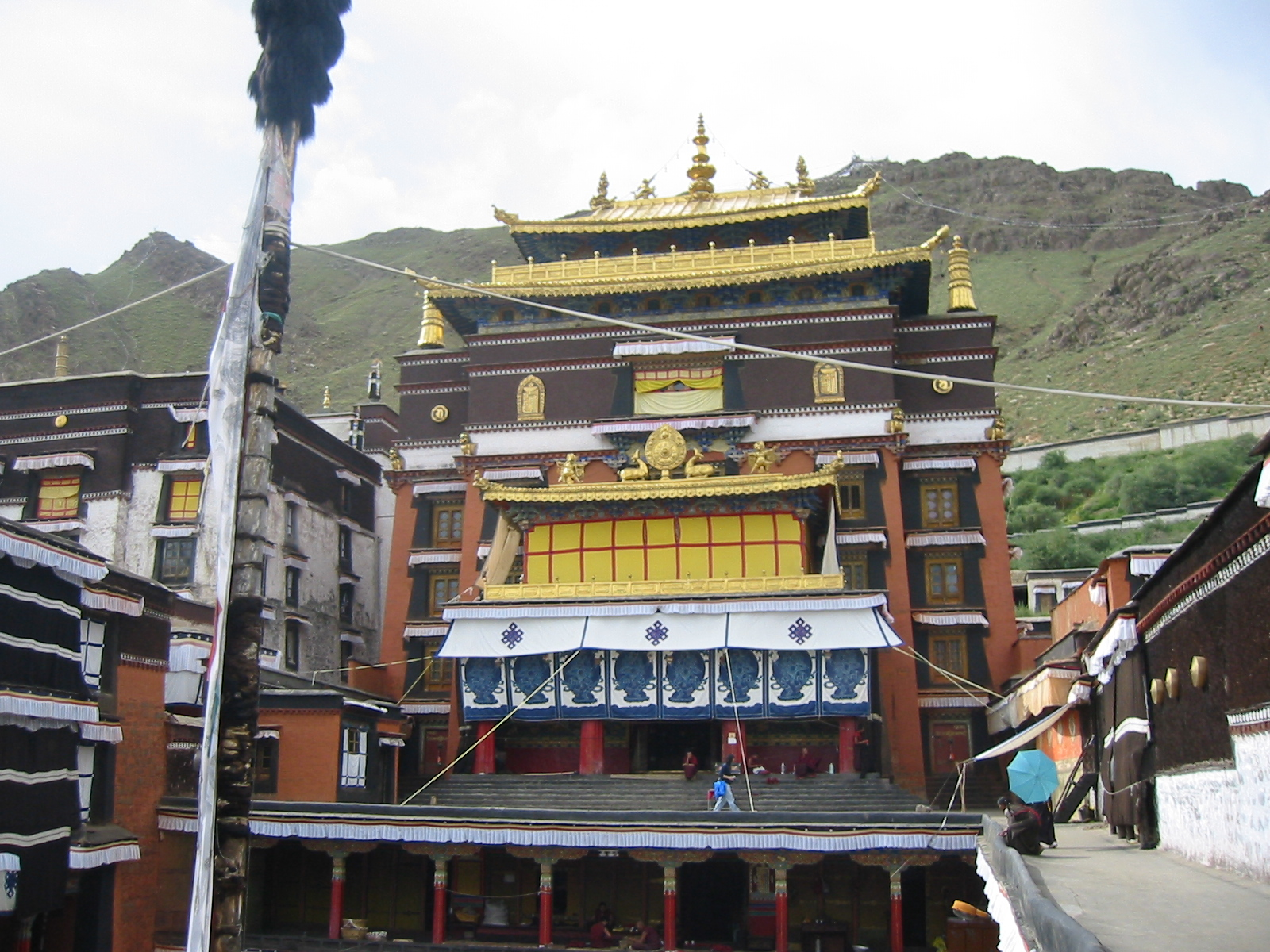
A view of the monastery

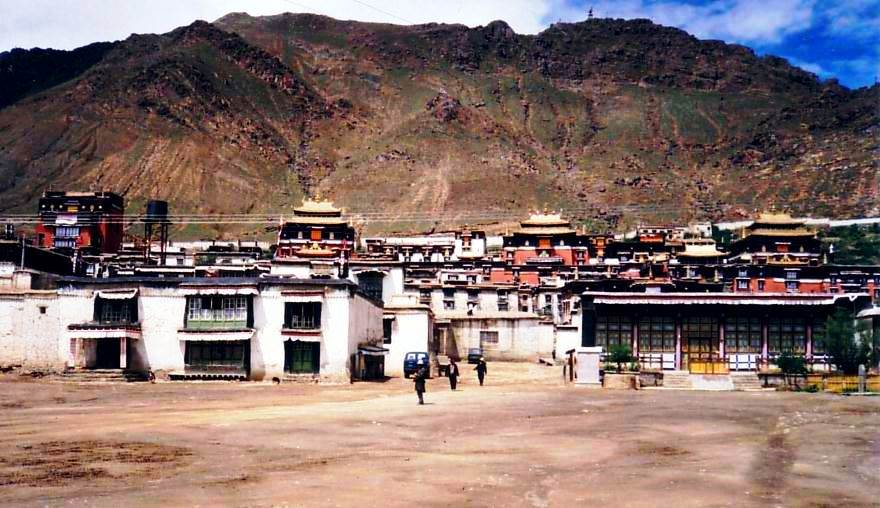
Another view of the monastery

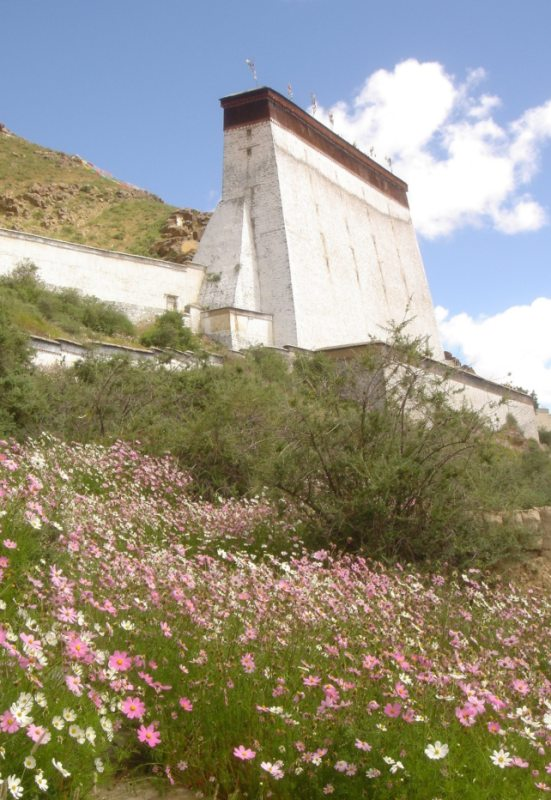
The thangka wall overlooking the monastery

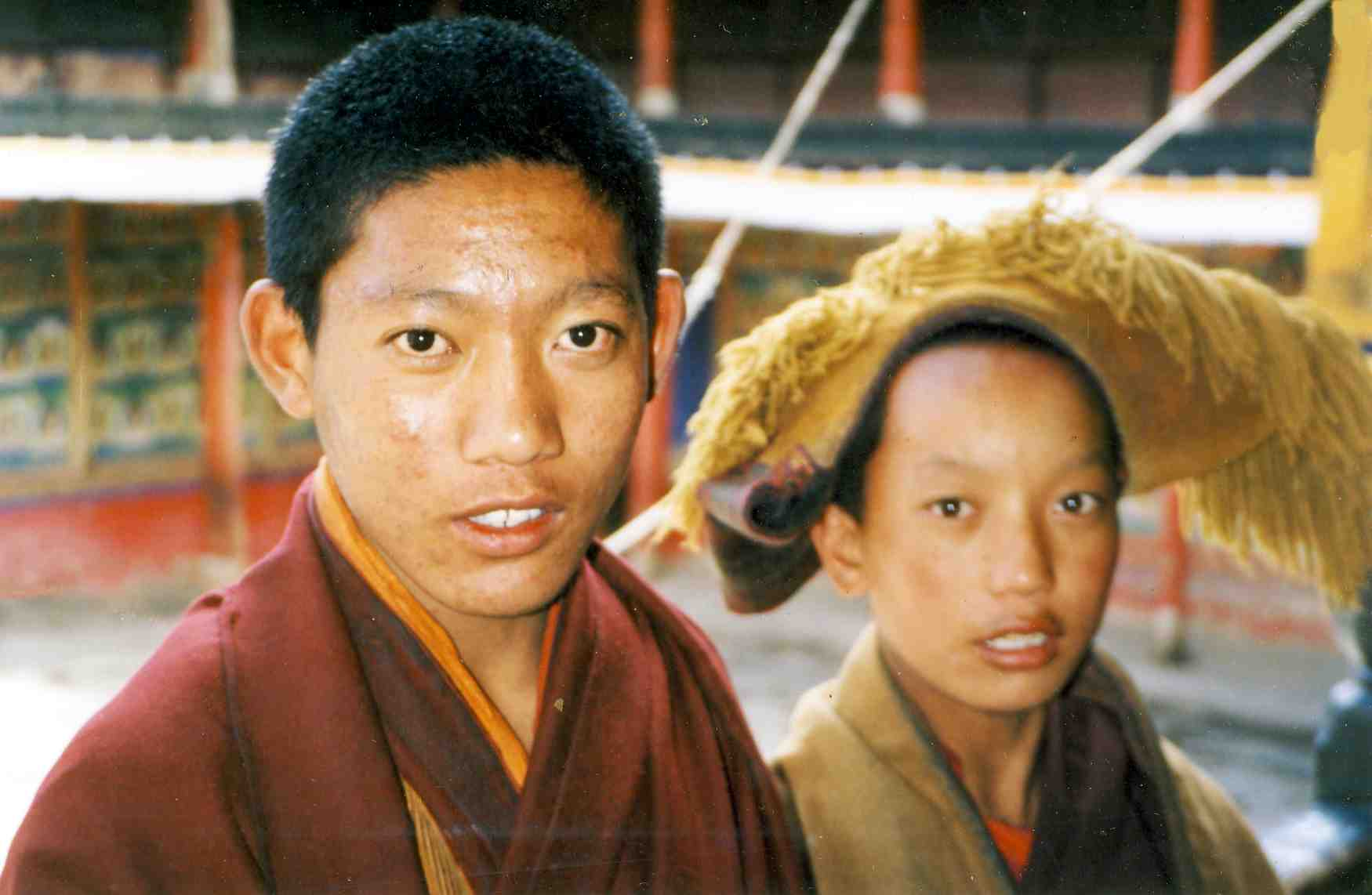
Two novice monks. Tashi Lhunpo, 1993

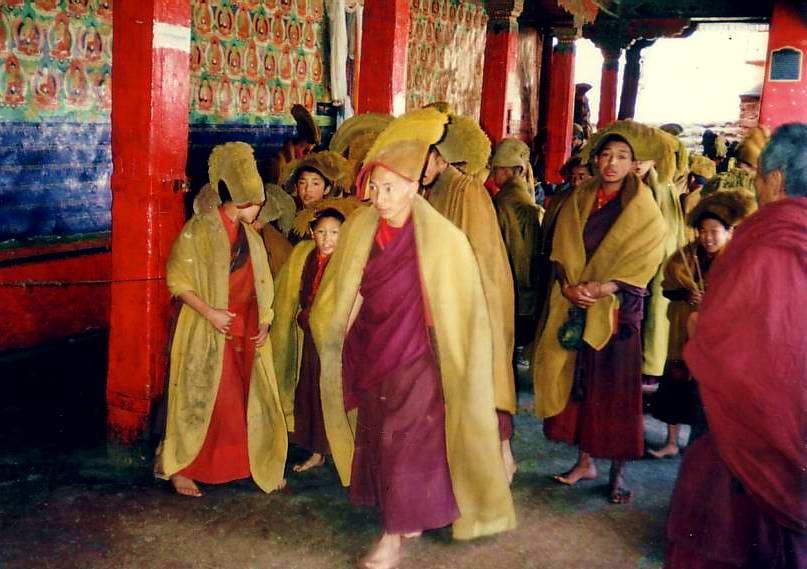
Monks hurrying to services, Tashi Lhunpo, 1993

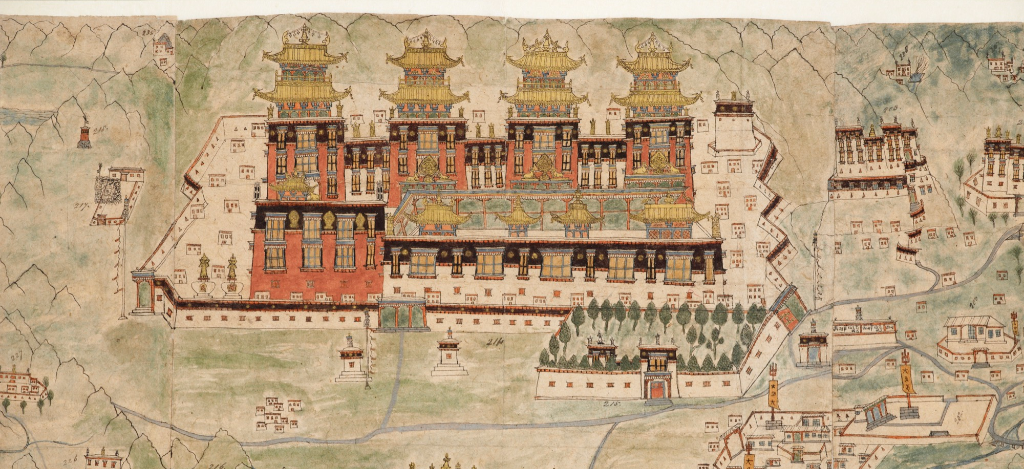
Tashi Lhunpo circa 1857

== Bronze Buddha statue ==
The tallest and largest bronze Jampa Buddha statue in the world is in Tashi Lhunpo Monastery. Jampa Buddha in Tibetan Buddhism is the Maitreya Buddha in Chinese Buddhism, which in charge of the future. This Buddha statue is 26.2 meters high. Squatting on the 3.5-meter-high lotus seat, he overlooks the entire monastery. The Buddha statue is decorated with more than 1,400 precious ornaments such as pearls, diamonds and corals. According to records, the Buddha statue was cast by 110 craftsmen in four years.

== Branch monasteries ==
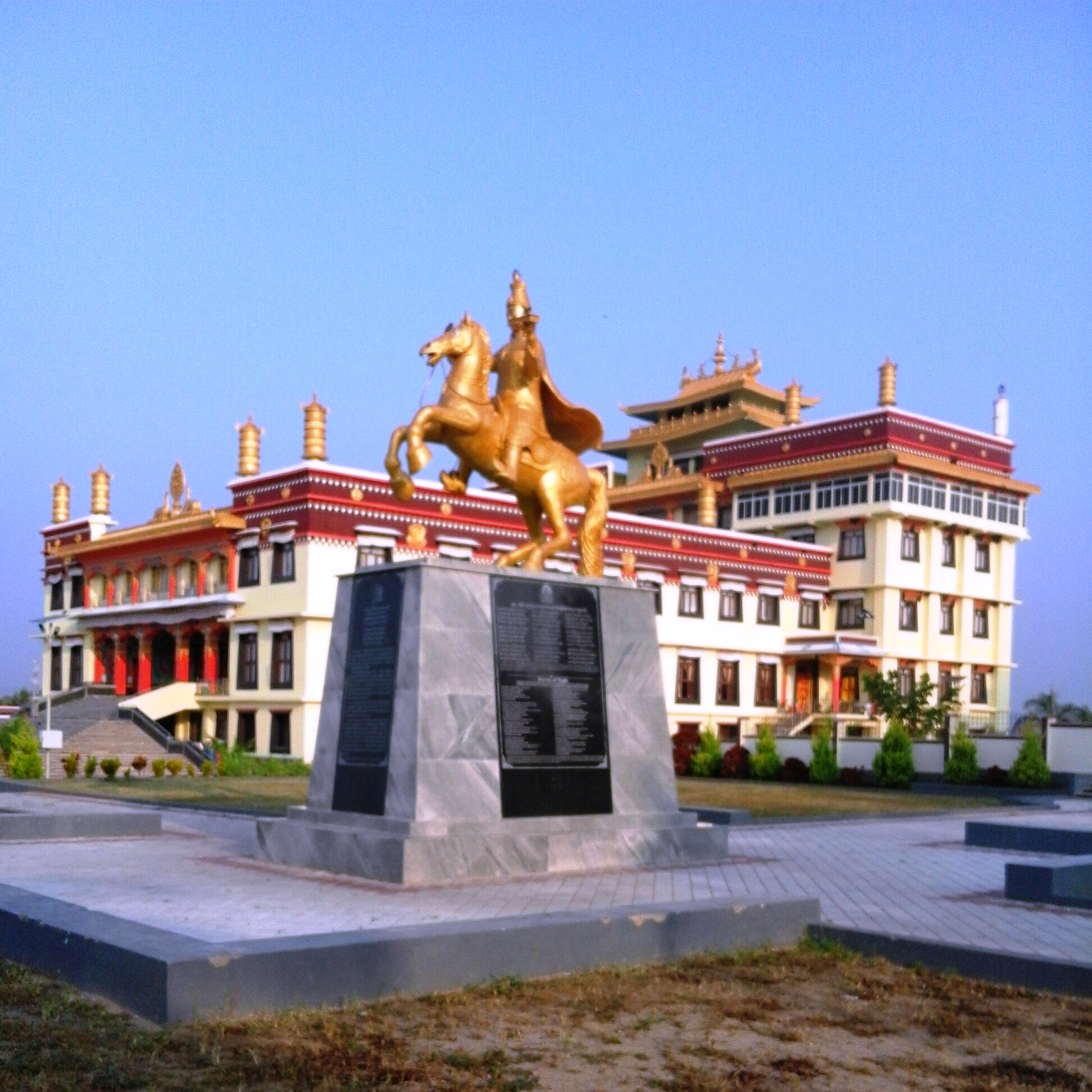
The Tashi Lhunpo monastery in Bylakuppe, India.

One of its branch monasteries was the famous Drongtse Monastery, 14 km north of Tsechen.

In 1972, another monastery was built in Bylakuppe, India, by the Tibetan population in exile.

== See also ==
- Panchen Lama
- Sera Monastery
