= Gelug =

Dominant school of Tibetan Buddhism

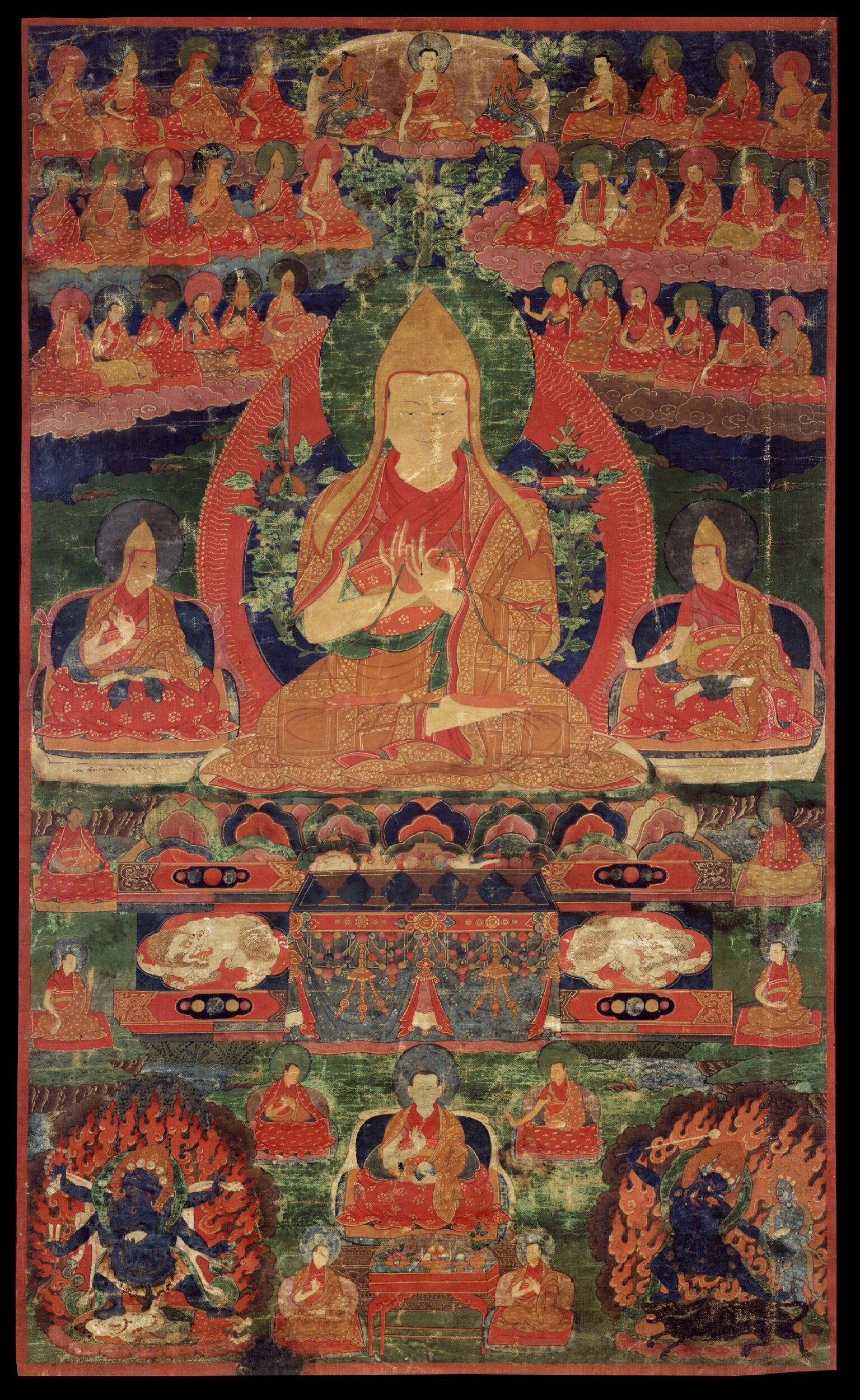
An illustration of Je Tsongkhapa, the founder, and his two principal students (Kédrup and Gyeltsap) on his left and right with other lineage teachers and protectors of the Gelug tradition

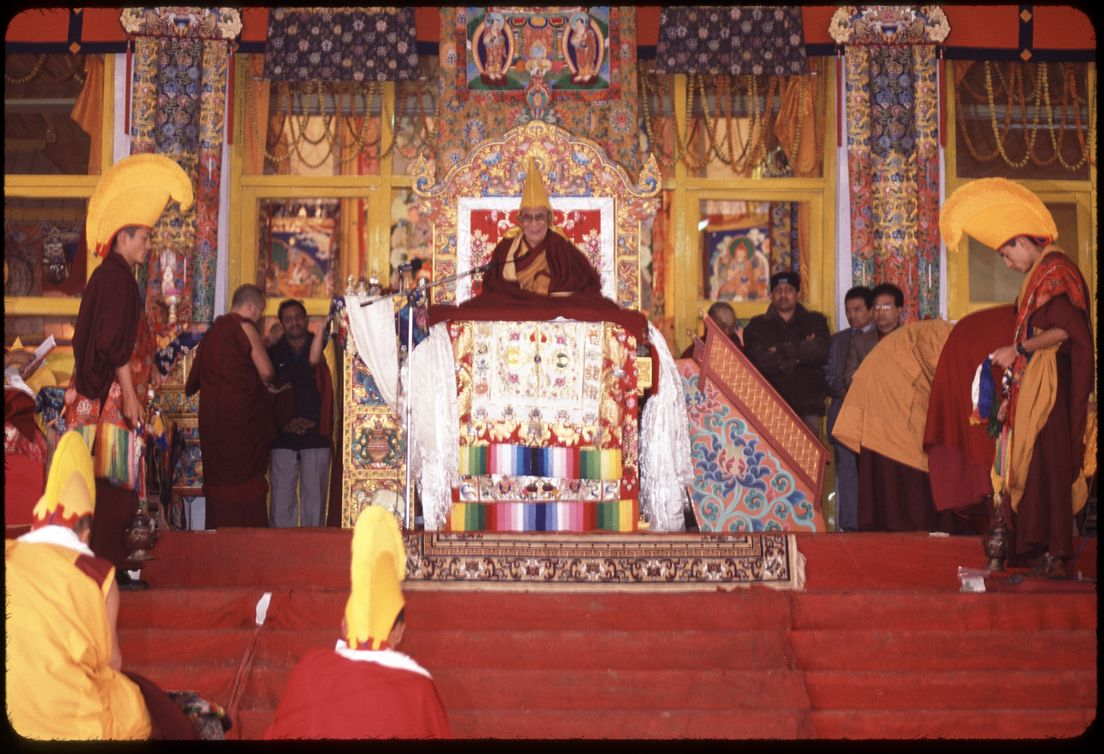
The 14th Dalai Lama (center), the most influential figure of the contemporary Gelug tradition, at the 2003 Kalachakra ceremony, Bodhgaya (India)

The Gelug (/ɡəˈluːɡ/, also Geluk; lit. 'virtuous') is the youngest of the four major schools of Tibetan Buddhism. It was founded by Je Tsongkhapa (1357–1419), a Tibetan philosopher, tantric yogi and lama and further expanded and developed by his disciples (such as Khedrup Je, Gyaltsap Je, Dulzin Drakpa Gyaltsen, and Gendün Drubpa).

The Gelug school is alternatively known as Kadam (bKa’-gdams gsar-pa), since it sees itself as a continuation of the Kadam tradition of Atisha (c. 11th century). The school of New Kadam, or New Kadampa is an offshoot of the Gelug-tradition. Furthermore, it is also called the Ganden school, after the first monastery established by Tsongkhapa. The Ganden Tripa ("Ganden Throne Holder") is the official head of the school, though its most influential political figure is the Dalai Lama ("Ocean Teacher"). Allying themselves with the Mongol Khans, the Gelug school emerged as the dominant Buddhist school in Tibet and Mongolia since the end of the 16th century (religiously and politically). Another alternative name for this tradition is the Yellow Hat school or sect.

Doctrinally, the Gelug school promotes a unique form of prasangika Madhyamaka based on the works of Tsongkhapa. According to John Powers, Tsongkhapa's work "contains a comprehensive view of Buddhist philosophy and practice that integrates sutra and tantra, analytical reasoning, and yogic meditation."

== Etymology ==
- Gelug

Tibetan name
- Tibetan: དགེ་ལུགས་པ་
Transcriptions
- Wylie: dge lugs pa
- Tibetan Pinyin: Gêlug
- Lhasa IPA: [ˈɡèluʔ]

Chinese name
- Traditional Chinese: 格魯派 / 黃教
- Simplified Chinese: 格鲁派 / 黄教
Transcriptions
Standard Mandarin
- Hanyu Pinyin: Gélǔ Pài / Huáng Jiào

"Ganden" (Wylie: dga' ldan) is the Tibetan rendition of the Sanskrit name "Tushita" (IAST: tuṣita), the Pure Land associated with Maitreya Buddha. At first, Tsongkhapa's school was called gan den chö luk (Wylie: dga' ldan chos lugs) meaning "the Spiritual Lineage of Ganden". By taking the first syllable of gan den and the second of chö luk, this was abbreviated to ga luk (Wylie: dga' lugs) and then modified to the more easily pronounced "Gelug" (Wylie: dge lugs, THL Phonetic: gé luk).

The Gelug school was also called the "New Kadam", because it saw itself a revival of the Kadam school founded by Atisha.

== History ==
=== Tsongkhapa ===
The Gelug school was founded by Je Tsongkhapa, an eclectic Buddhist monk and yogi who traveled Tibet studying under Kadam, Sakya, Drikung Kagyu, Jonang and Nyingma teachers. These include the Sakya scholar Rendawa (1349–1412), the Drikung Thil scholar Chenga Chokyi Gyalpo, the Kadam mystic Lama Umapa, the Jonang master Bodong Chokley Namgyal and the Dzogchen master Drupchen Lekyi Dorje.

A great admirer of the Kadam school, Tsongkhapa merged the Kadam teachings of lojong (mind training) and lamrim (stages of the path) with the Vajrayana teachings of the Sakya, Kaygu and Jonang schools. He also emphasized monasticism and a strict adherence to vinaya (monastic discipline). He combined this with extensive and unique writings on madhyamaka, Buddhist epistemology, and Buddhist practice. Tsongkhapa's numerous works on philosophy and tantric practice were widely influential and they marked a turning point in the history of Tibetan Buddhist philosophy.

Tsongkhapa and his disciples founded Ganden monastery in 1409, which was followed by the founding of Drepung (1416) and Sera (in 1419), which became the "great three" Gelug monasteries (and eventually they would become some of the largest monasteries in the world). According to Sam van Schaik these Gelug centers "came to form a triumvirate of massive Gelug monasteries that would dominate the religious and political life of Central Tibet for centuries."

=== Early growth ===
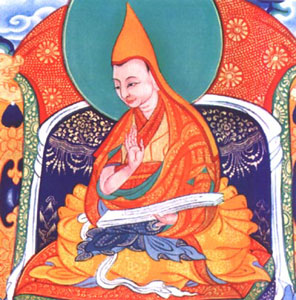
Khedrup Gelek Pelzang, 1st Panchen Lama (1385–1438 CE), the main leader of the Gelug school after Tsongkhapa's death

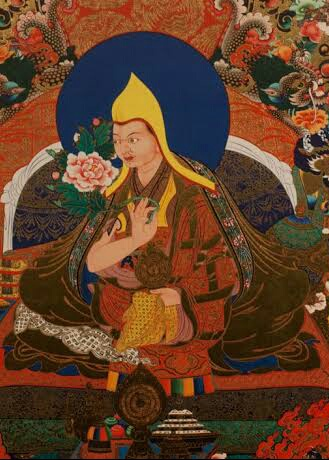
Gendun Drup, founder of Tashilhunpo Monastery, and the First Dalai Lama

After the death of Tsongkhapa in 1419 (who at the time was already famous and had attracted numerous disciples) the Gelug (a.k.a. Ganden) order grew extremely quickly through the efforts of Tsongkhapa's disciples who founded numerous new monasteries and spread the doctrine throughout Tibet. The Gelug school developed a reputation for strict adherence to monastic discipline (vinaya) and rigorous scholarship as well as for tantric practice. According to Sam van Schaik, while Tsongkhapa himself did not work to establish a brand new school per se, it was Tsongkhapa's disciples who took up the project of formally constructing a new school of Buddhism. Furthermore, van Schaik writes that "much of the credit for defining and defending the new school must go to Tsongkhapa’s student Khedrup."

Tsongkhapa's three principal disciples were Khedrup Gelek Palsang, Gyaltsap Darma Rinchen and Dülzin Drakpa Gyaltsen. Other important students of Tsongkhapa were Tokden Jampel Gyatso; Jamyang Chöjé and Jamchen Chöjé (the founders of Drepung and Sera monasteries, respectively); and Gendün Drup the First Dalai Lama." Several major monastic centers were founded in Tsang, including Tashi Lhünpo, Segyü, Gyümé and Gyütö college. By the end of the fifteenth century, the collected works of Tsongkhapa had been set on woodblock prints. His works would later be collected together with the works of Gyaltsap and Khedrup (who wrote numerous commentaries on Indian classics and on the works of Tsongkhapa) to become the main unique canonical collection of the Gelug school which is known as the “Father and Sons Collected Works” (jé yapsé ungbum).

According to Thupten Jinpa, by the end of the fifteenth century, the "new Ganden tradition had spread through the entire Tibetan cultural area, with monasteries upholding the tradition located in western Tibet, in Tsang, in central and southern Tibet, and in Kham and Amdo in the east." John Powers also notes that during the following centuries the Gelug school "continued to produce an impressive number of eminent scholars and tantric adepts."

By the end of the fifteenth century, Tsongkhapa had come to be seen as a second Buddha among in the Gelug tradition, and various hagiographies were written by his disciples (like Khedrup Je and Tokden Jampel Gyatso). These texts developed the great myths of the Buddha Tsongkhapa (including stories of his previous births and his various mystical visions) and helped established the new identity of the Gelug school as an authentic lineage (traced back to Manjushri). Meanwhile, among the other Tibetan schools, Tsongkhapa now came to be considered "a force to be reckoned with, someone whose vision, ideas, and writings had to be understood in relation to their own cherished lineage and tradition."

This initial period of growth also saw scholastic debates and exchanges between the new Gelug tradition and the earlier sects like the Sakya school, who wrote critiques of Tsongkhapa's philosophy, such as Rongton Shakya Gyaltsen (1367–1449) (and his work led to a response by Khedrup Je). This debate over Tsongkhapa's madhyamaka interpretation was then taken up by a trio of Sakya school thinkers: Taktsang Lotsawa, Gorampa, and Shākya Chokden. Their critique would be countered by the works of numerous Gelug scholars, such as Lekpa Chöjor (a.k.a. Jamyang Galo, 1429–1503), the first Panchen Lama Lozang Chökyi Gyaltsen (1507–1662), Jetsun Chökyi Gyaltsen (1469–1544/46), Sera Jetsun Chökyi Gyaltsen, Panchen Delek Nyima and Jamyang Zhepa (1648–1751).

=== The Dalai Lamas and spread to Mongolia ===
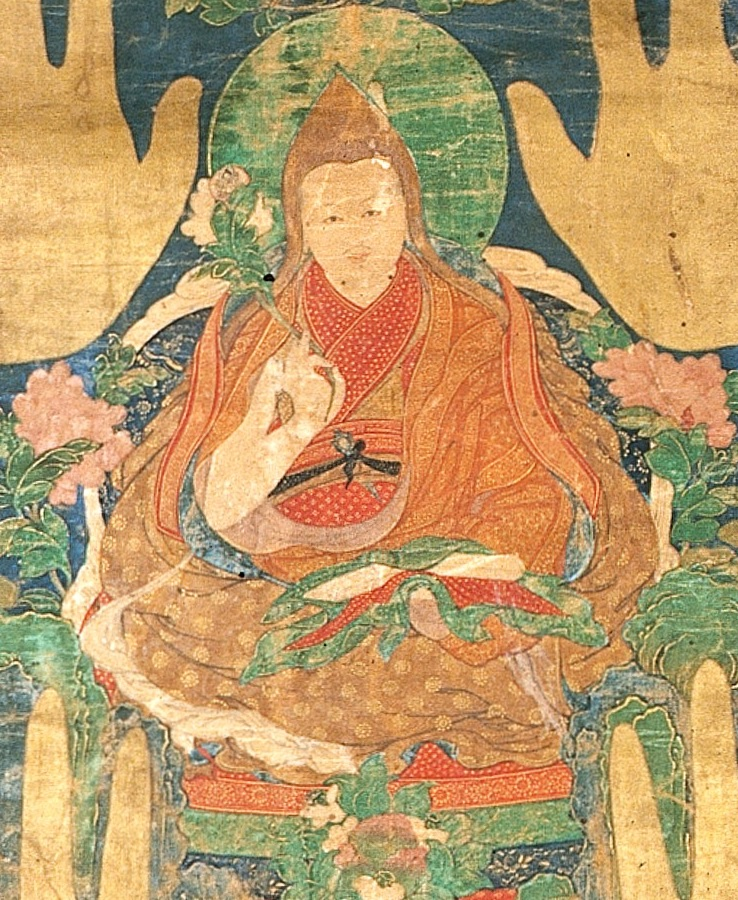
The third Dalai Lama, Sönam Gyatso

In 1577 Sönam Gyatso, who was considered to be the third incarnation of Gendün Drup, formed an alliance with the then most powerful Mongol leader, Altan Khan. As a result, Sönam Gyatso was designated as the 3rd Dalai Lama. "Dalai" is a translation into Mongolian of the Tibetan name "Gyatso" (ocean). Gendün Drup and Gendun Gyatso were posthumously recognized as the 1st and 2nd Dalai Lamas respectively.

Sönam Gyatso was very active in proselytizing among the Mongols, and the Gelug tradition was to become the main religion of the Mongols in the ensuing centuries. Sönam Gyatso traveled to Mongolia, and supported the establishment of monasteries and the translation of Buddhist texts to Mongolian. He also worked against certain shamanistic practices such as animal sacrifice and blood sacrifices.

This turn of events provided the Gelug school with powerful patrons who were to propel them to political pre-eminence in Tibet. The Gelug-Mongol alliance was further strengthened as after Sonam Gyatso's death, his incarnation was found to be Altan Khan's great-grandson, who became the 4th Dalai Lama. The influence of the Gelug school on Mongolian Buddhism remains strong today. According to Thupten Jinpa "an important legacy of this relationship has been the tradition of young Mongols studying at the great Geluk centers of learning in Amdo and central Tibet."

=== The rule of the Great Fifth ===
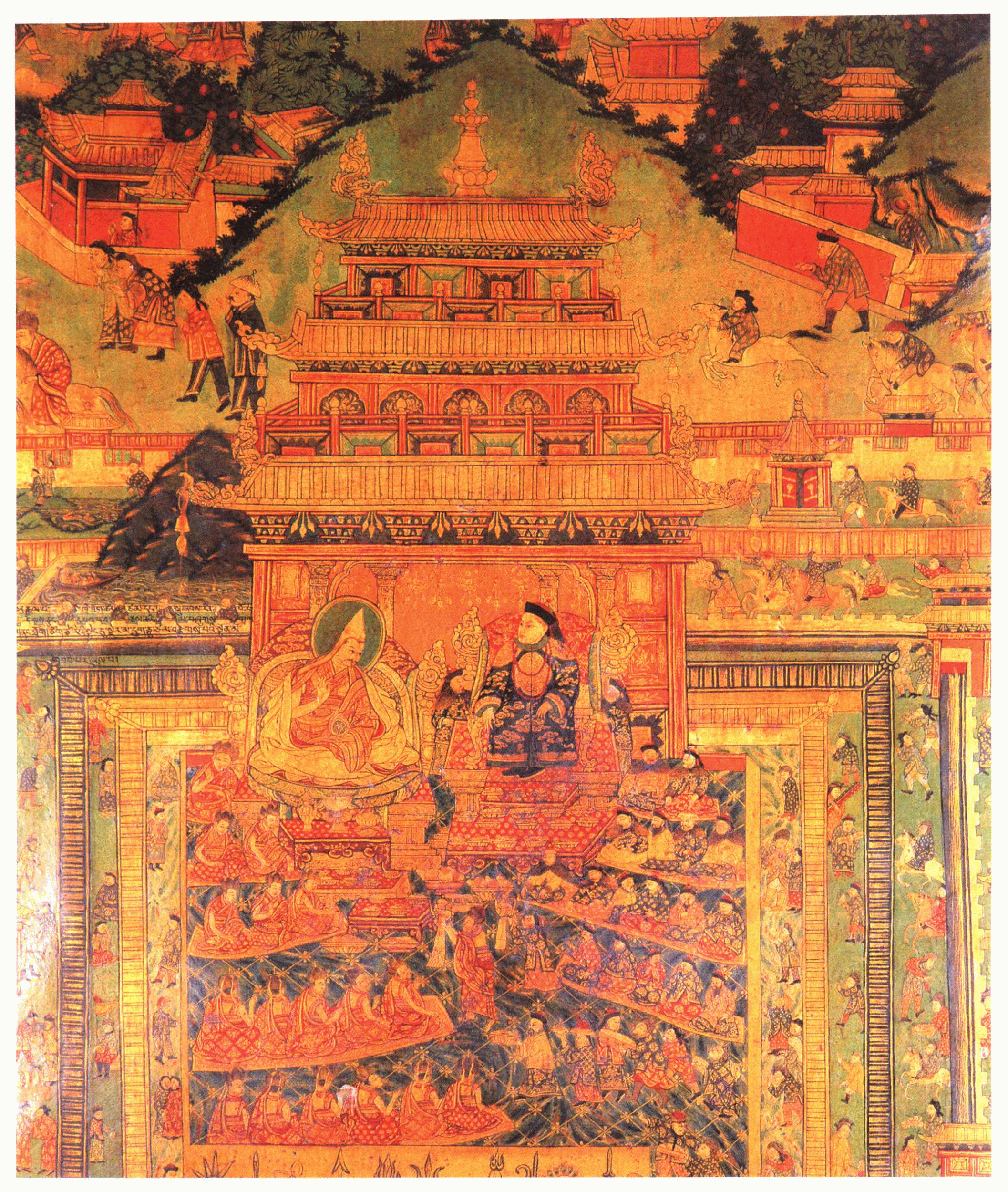
Qing dynasty painting of the 5th Dalai Lama meeting the Shunzhi Emperor in Beijing, 1653

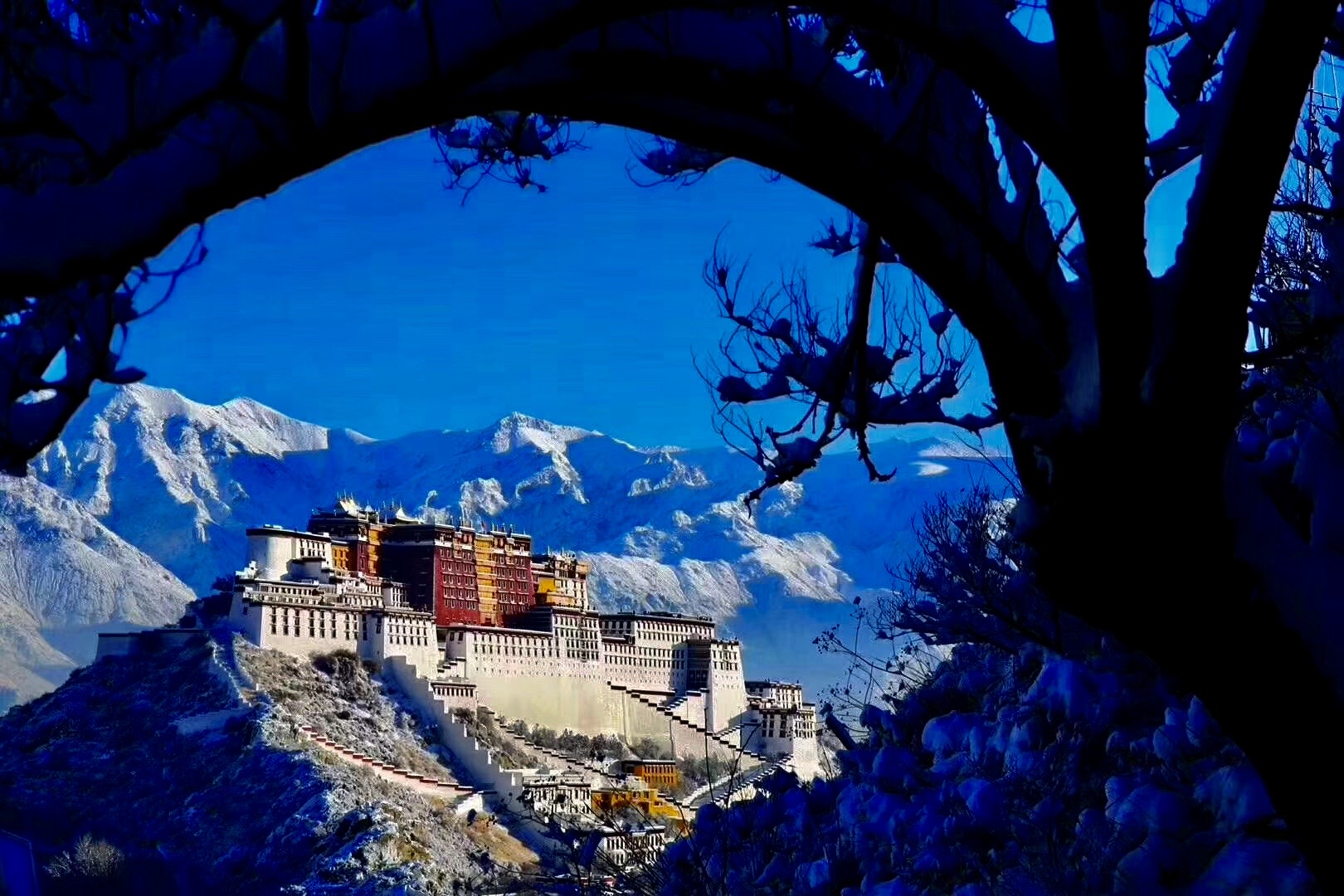
Potala Palace

Following violent strife among the sects of Tibetan Buddhism, the Gelug school emerged as the dominant one, with the military help of the Mongol Güshri Khan who invaded Tibet in 1642 in order to defeat the king of Tsang. According to Tibetan historian Samten Karmay, Sonam Chophel (1595–1657), treasurer of the Ganden Palace, was the prime architect of the Gelug's rise to political power. Later he received the title Desi [Wylie: sde-sris], meaning "Regent", which he would earn through his efforts to establish Gelugpa power.

The 5th Dalai Lama, Ngawang Lobsang Gyatso (1617–1682), was the first in his line to hold full political and spiritual power in Tibet. He established a formal theocratic system of government, opened diplomatic relations with Qing dynasty China, built the Potala Palace in Lhasa, institutionalized the Tibetan state Nechung Oracle, and spurred a major renaissance in art and book printing. From the period of the 5th Dalai Lama in the 17th century, the Dalai Lamas held political control over central Tibet. The core leadership of this government was also referred to as the Ganden Phodrang. According to Thupten Jinpa, the 5th Dalai Lama's rule "would bring Tibet into a semblance of political unity for the first time since the collapse of the Tibetan empire some seven hundred years earlier."

The Fifth Dalai Lama was a prolific author and scholar. According to Jinpa "the Fifth Dalai Lama was personally an ecumenist who revered Tibet’s other major Buddhist traditions, especially the Nyingma." In this he was influenced by his teacher Paljor Lhundrup who was a Gelug monk and master of the Nyingma Great Perfection (Dzogchen) tradition. The "Great Fifth" wrote numerous works and revealed a cycle of Dzogchen teachings. One of his students (and political successor as regent), Desi Sangye Gyatso was also known as a great scholar who wrote various works on topics like Tibetan medicine, astrology, biography and calligraphy. He is the author of the important Tibetan medical text, The Mirror of Beryl, commissioned a set of medical paintings and wrote a biography of the Fifth Dalai Lama.

During the rule of the Fifth Dalai Lama that his teacher Lobsang Chökyi Gyaltsen received the title "Panchen Bogd" from Altan Khan and the Dalai Lama in 1645. This is the beginning of the Panchen Lama tulku line, who traditionally rules Shigatse and the Tsang region from his base at Tashilhunpo Monastery. The institutions of the Dalai Lama and Panchen Lama each participate in the process of recognizing each other's reincarnations. Lobsang Chökyi Gyaltsen was a prolific scholar and a great yogi who is particularly known for his writings on Gelug Mahamudra (mainly his root text Highway of the Conquerors and its auto-commentary Lamp re-illuminating Mahamudra).

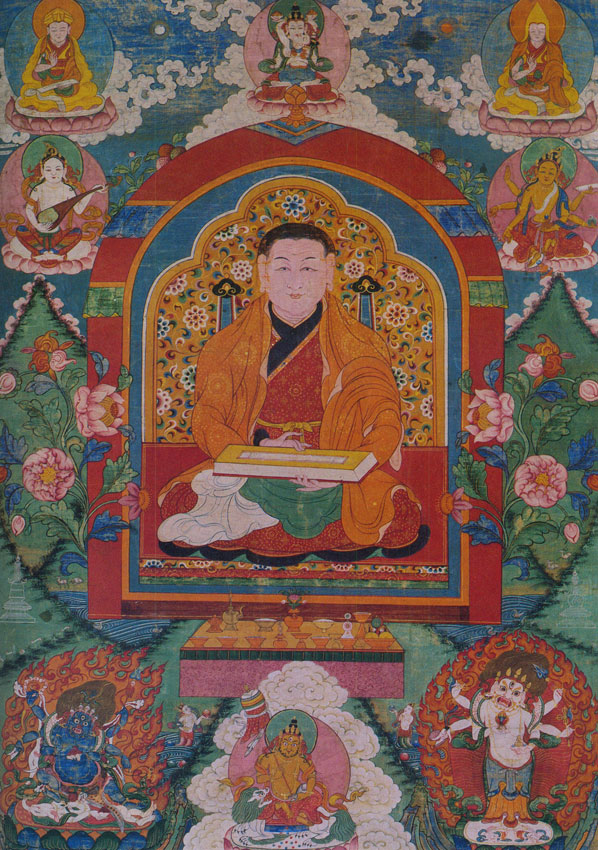
Zanabanzar, self-portrait, late 17th or early 18th century, Museum of Fine Arts, Ulan Bator

The Fifth Dalai Lama is also known for having recognized Zanabazar (1635–1723) as the first official Jebtsundamba Khutuktu, the spiritual leader (Bogd Gegeen) of the Mongolian Gelug tradition. Zanabazar was a great Mongolian polymath who excelled in painting, sculpture, poetry, scholarship and languages. He is credited with having launched a renaissance of Mongolian culture in the seventeenth century, with having created the Soyombo script and with widely promoting Buddhism among the Mongols. Zanabazar also oversaw the construction of numerous major Gelug monasteries in Mongolia, such as Shankh Monastery, Tövkhön Monastery and Erdene Zuu Monastery.

The rule of the 5th Dalai Lama also oversaw the repression of the schools of Tibetan Buddhism who were political enemies of the Gelug school and had supported the Tsang dynasty. After the war, many Kagyu and Jonang monasteries were forcefully converted to Gelug monasteries. The writings of the Jonang school as well any literature from the Sakya masters who had attacked Tsongkhapa were also banned and their woodblock prints were locked away. The Dalai Lama's attitude towards Nyingma was different, and he supported the collection and preservation of Nyingma texts, as well as personally patronizing the Mindroling monastery and their leaders Terdag Lingpa and Lochen Dharmashri.

=== 17 and 18th centuries ===
The Sixth Dalai Lama (1683–1706) was an unconventional figure who liked to live as a layperson, refused monastic vows, drank alcohol, slept with women and wrote love poems and erotic poems. His verses are an important part of Tibetan poetry. His successor, the 7th Dalai Lama, was also a noted poet, but he wrote mainly on Buddhist and spiritual themes. The 7th Dalai Lama Kelzang Gyatso was a highly learned Buddhist scholar and wrote hundreds of titles on various Buddhist topics. During the time of the 7th, Tibet also became a protectorate of the Qing Empire under the Kangxi Emperor (r. 1661–1722).

The 8th, 9th, 10th. 11th and 12th Dalai Lamas all died young and were not significant figures. Tibet was ruled by a series of regents during this period and experienced much political instability.

During the 17th and 18th centuries, Gelug figures continued to produce new scholastic works. The development of the "tenets" (Tib. grub mtha', Skt. siddhanta) genre (a form of doxography) became a particularly important element of Gelug education and scholarship. Perhaps the most influential Gelug doxographer was the great scholar Jamyang Shéba (1648– 1721), who wrote Roar of the Five-Faced [Lion], a series of verses on tenets, and a huge commentary to this root text (around 530 folios), called Great Exposition on Tenets. According to Daniel Cozort, Jamyang's works "are the most comprehensive of the tenets texts" (in Tibetan Buddhism). His reincarnation, Gönchok Jikmé Ongpo (1728–1791), is also known for his shorter tenets text called Precious Garland of Tenets as well as other works on the bodhisattva path.

Other key Gelug scholars of this period include Changkya Rölpé Dorjé (1717–1786), who wrote Presentation of Tenets, and Ngawang Belden (b. 1797), who wrote a major commentary on Jamyang’s Great Exposition.

Changkya Rölpé Dorjé is also known for his knowledge of languages and translation work and for being the main teacher in the Qing court of the Qianlong Emperor. Changkya oversaw the translation of the Tibetan Buddhist canon into Mongolian and Manchu, compiled a collection of the canon in four languages (Chinese, Manchurian, Mongolian and Tibetan) and also supervised the translation of the Śūraṅgama Sūtra into Tibetan.

During the 18th century, Thuken Losang Chökyi Nyima (1737–1802), a student of Changkya, took the tenets genre one step further with his Crystal Mirror of Philosophical Systems. According to Roger R. Jackson, this text is "arguably the widest-ranging account of religious philosophies ever written in pre-modern Tibet." This work of comparative philosophy and comparative religion discusses all schools of Tibetan Buddhism, Chinese Buddhism and Chinese religions as well as Indian, Mongolian and Khotanese religious systems.

=== The 19th century ===
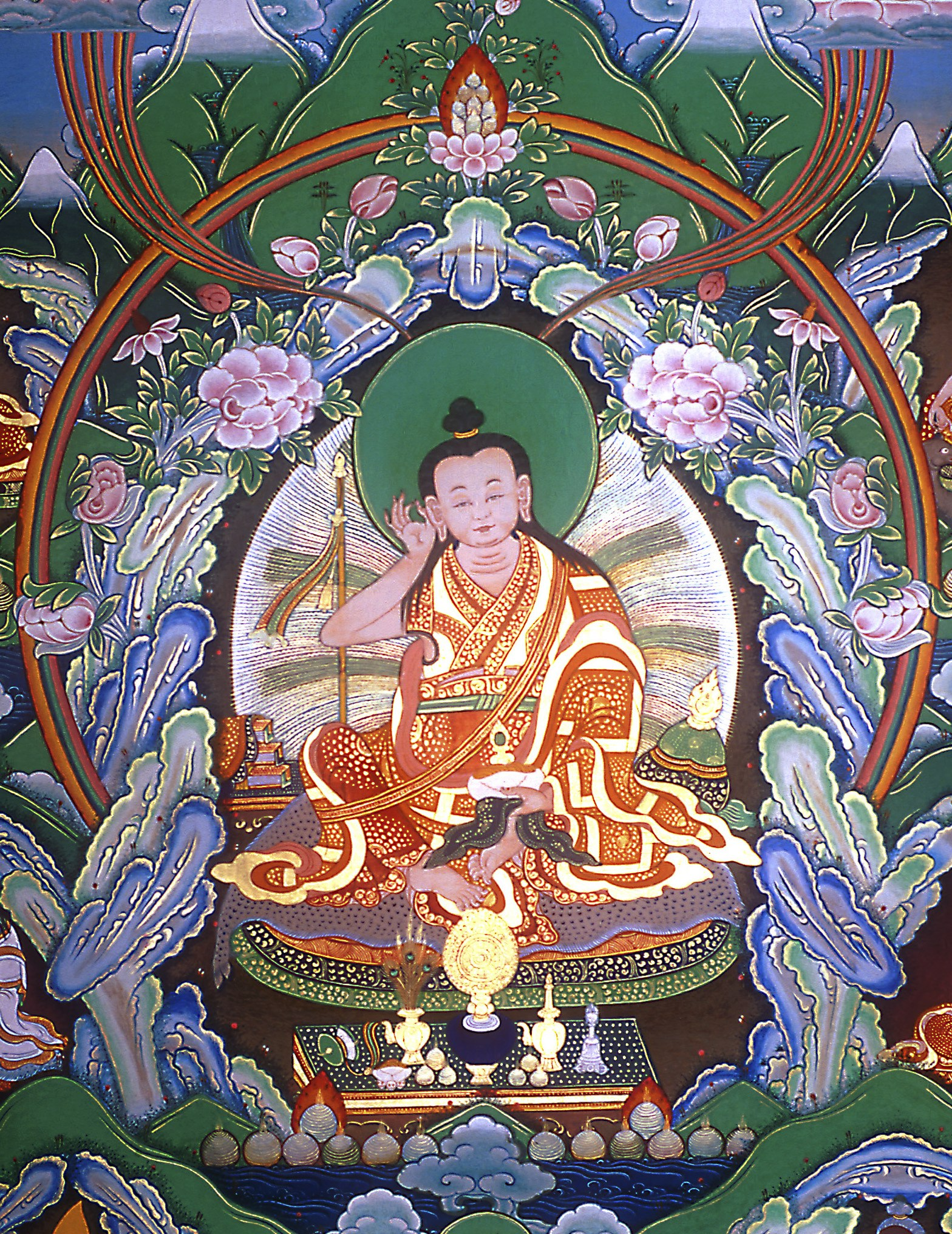
Shabkar Tsokdruk Rangdrol

The 19th century saw the great figure of Shabkar Tsokdruk Rangdrol (1781–1851) who was an influential Gelug monk, poet and Dzogchen yogi who is particularly known for his non-sectarian study of various Tibetan Buddhist traditions, especially the Gelug and Nyingma traditions. His writings on non-sectarianism prefigure the rise of the Rime movement by about three decades. His autobiography and other works integrate the teachings of the Gelug tradition with that of the Nyingma school. Another Gelug master who was associated with non-sectarian activity was Minyak Kunzang Sonam (1823–1905). He was a Dzogchen practitioner and one of the four great Dharma heirs of the Nyingma master Patrul Rinpoche.

During the era of the 13th Dalai Lama (1876–1933) Tibet reclaimed its independence from China and went through some reforms and modernization activities. The 13th focused on centralizing and modernizing the Tibetan state through developing a modern tax system, military, police and administration. These changes brought about some conflict from the elite Gelug institutions who were used to running their own finances, the most shocking of which was when the 9th Panchen Lama fled for China after losing a power struggle with the Dalai lama. The 13th Dalai Lama also launched a new modern printing of the Tibetan Buddhist canon.

The 20th century saw several influential figures emerge from Gelug institutions, including Gendün Chöphel (1903–1951) and Pabongkha Déchen Nyingpo (1878–1941). During the reign of the 13th Dalai Lama, the so-called "Dorje Shugden controversy" began, spearheaded by the sectarian tendencies of Pabongkha. This division within the Gelug order was based on the worship of a protector deity named Dorje Shugden who was said to punish Gelugs who entered into practices from other Buddhist schools. 13th Dalai Lama (who himself practiced Nyingma Dzogchen and the deity Vajrakilaya) opposed this sectarianism.

=== PRC era, diaspora and the West ===
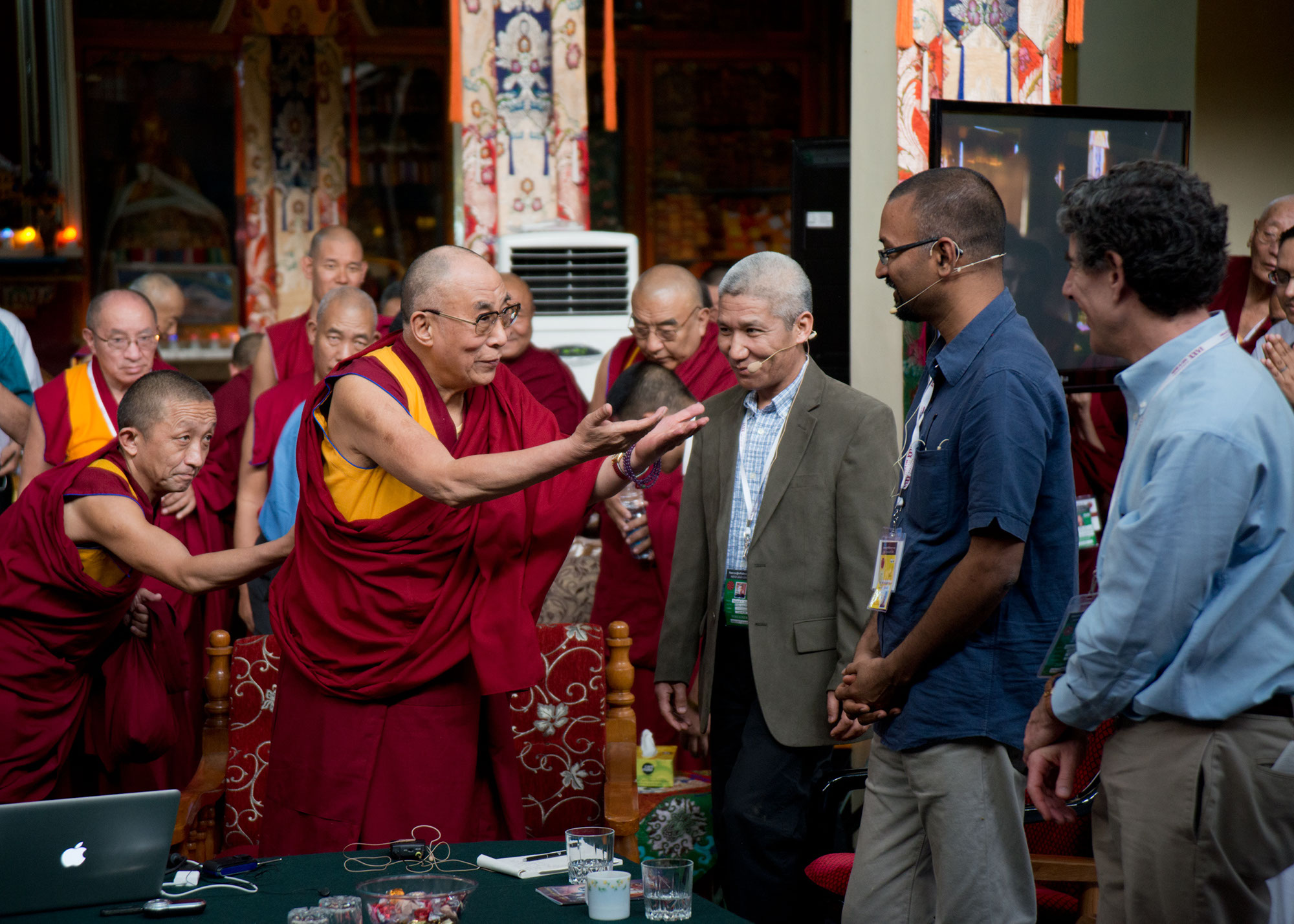
Rajesh Kasturirangan with the 14th Dalai Lama, Thupten Jinpa and Richard Davidson at Mind and Life Institute XXVI conference, 2013. The Mind and Life institute has been a series of dialogues on Buddhism and science, and these have influenced the field of contemplative science.

After the Annexation of Tibet by the People's Republic of China and thousands of Tibetan monasteries were destroyed or damaged (mainly during the 1959 Tibetan uprising and the Cultural Revolution of 1966–1976), and many Gelug monks, including the 14th Dalai Lama fled the country to India as part of the Tibetan diaspora. The three major Gelug monastic colleges (Sera, Drepung and Ganden) were recreated in India. The Dalai Lama's current seat is Namgyal Monastery at Dharamshala, this monastery also maintains a branch monastery in Ithaca, New York.

The 14th Dalai Lama is a central leader of the modern Tibetan diaspora and continues to advocate for Tibetan autonomy and human rights as well as continuing to teach Tibetan Buddhism throughout the world. The Dalai Lama has met with numerous political and religious leaders, as well as scientists and philosophers and promotes nonviolence, interfaith dialogue, and the dialogue between Buddhism and science. The Dalai Lama has become one of the world's most admired religious figures.

Numerous other Gelug teachers now teach in the West and Gelug centers have become a regular part of Western Buddhism. Perhaps the largest religious organization associated with the Gelug tradition is the Foundation for the Preservation of the Mahayana Tradition, founded in 1975 by Thubten Yeshe and Thubten Zopa Rinpoche. The organization runs numerous meditation centers, several monasteries such as Nalanda monastery in France and as well Maitripa College. Other influential Gelug lamas who have taught western Buddhists include Ngawang Wangyal, Lhundub Sopa (who founded Deer Park Buddhist Center and Monastery), Geshe Rabten, Choden Rinpoche, Kyabje Yongzin Ling Rinpoche, Geshe Lhakdor, and Dhardo Rinpoche. Some Gelug lamas also went on to receive a modern western university education and became published academics, such as Gelek Rinpoche, Geshe Thupten Jinpa, Geshe Gyeltsen, and Sonam Thakchoe.

Some western students of diaspora Gelug lamas (some of which spent time as monastics) have also become scholars of Buddhism as well as translators and teachers, including Alexander Berzin, B. Alan Wallace, Robert Thurman, Robina Courtin, Jeffrey Hopkins, Donald S. Lopez Jr., José Cabezón, Guy Martin Newland, Nicholas Vreeland, Barry Kerzin, Glenn H. Mullin, and Gareth Sparham.

An American Gelug bhiksuni, Thubten Chodron, is the founder and abbess of Sravasti Abbey, the only Tibetan Buddhist training monastery for Western bhiksunis (fully ordained female monastics) and bhikkus (fully ordained male monastics) in the United States.

After the brutal repression of Buddhism during the Maoist period, three Gelug scholars became important figures in the revival of Tibetan studies in the People's Republic of China. These were known as the “Three Polymaths”, which were Tséten Zhabdrung (1910–1985), Mugé Samten (1914–1993), and Dungkar Lozang Trinlé (1927–1997).

The Mongolian Gelug school under by the 9th Jebtsundamba Khutughtu, led the revival of Mongolian Buddhism after the fall of communist rule in Mongolia in 1990. The Gelug tradition also has a strong traditional presence in modern Russian Republics like Buryatia, Kalmykia and Tuva.

== Teachings ==
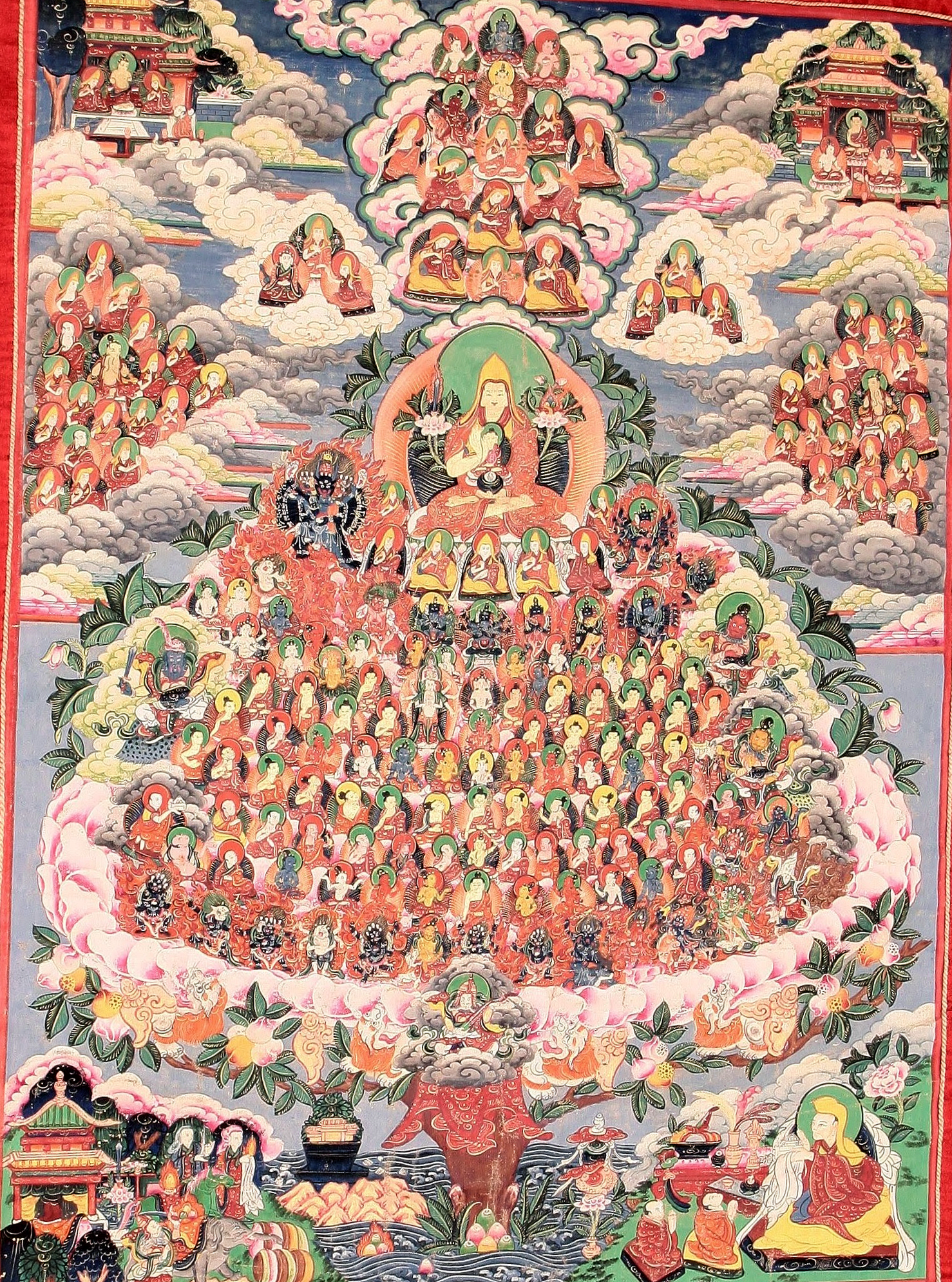
Gelug Lineage Refuge Tree thangka depicting Je Tsongkapa at the center of the tree surrounded by Indian and Tibetan Buddhist masters. Thangkas like these are often used as a focus for taking refuge.

=== Steps of the path (lam rim) ===
Tsongkhapa's works contain a systematic synthesis of Buddhist doctrine which provides a comprehensive vision of the Buddhist path, based on classical Indian Mahayana and Vajrayana. The main Mahayana teachings are found in various texts such as Tsongkhapa's the Great Exposition of the Graded Path (Lam rim chen mo), the Middling Graded Path (Lam rim ‘bring ba), and the Small Graded Path (Lam rim chung ngu). Other related works include The Three Principles of the Path, The Foundation of All Good Qualities. There are also various other expositions of the Lamrim by other figures such as the 3rd Dalai Lama's Essence of Refined Gold and Panchen Losang Chökyi Gyaltsen's Easy Path (de lam).

These Lamrim works are based on the teachings of the Indian master Atiśa (c. 11th century) in A Lamp for the Path to Awakening as well on the works of Shantideva and other Indian Madhyamaka authors. According to Gelug scholastics, Tsongkhapa's presentation of the stages of the path is traced through Atisha back to Nagarjuna (who received it from Manjushri). Tsongkhapa is also said to have incorporated elements from Asanga's presentation of the path (as taught to him by Maitreya).

The presentation of samatha and vipaśyanā in Tsongkhapa's Lamrim is also based on eighth-century Indian teacher Kamalaśīla's Bhāvanākrama (Stages of Meditation). Another important text in Gelug is the Book of Kadam also known as the Kadam Emanation Scripture which includes teachings from Kadam masters like Atisha and Dromton.

==== The schema of the three motivations ====
As the name indicates, this is a gradual path model in which the practitioner accomplishes varying stages of contemplation and training based on classical Indian Mahayana Buddhism. The presentation of the Buddhist path begins with beings on the lowest level (those who have wrong view and are filled with afflictions) and provides a gradual, step by step path out of this state through diligent training, ethical action and contemplation. According to Powers "the path is envisioned as proceeding in hierarchically arranged stages, and trainees are expected to complete each level before moving on to the next one."

The Lamrim teachings are commonly organized based on three main graduated scopes of motivation:

- The lowest scope suitable for those who delight in cyclic existence (samsara) and desire to seek a good rebirth in higher realms. Spiritual practices that are taught for this motivation include contemplating the preciousness of our human rebirth, turning away from the eight worldly concerns, contemplating the suffering of lower rebirths, contemplation of death, the preciousness of human life, and impermanence, taking refuge in the three jewels and contemplating the karmic law of cause and effect. Another important element for this level is the practice of ethical self-discipline (sila) by avoiding the ten harmful actions and cultivating the ten wholesome actions.
- The middle scope of those who are seeking liberation from the round of rebirths for themselves (the Sravaka or Hinayana motivation). The focus of this middle scope is cultivating renunciation and a desire for true freedom. This comes from contemplating how all forms of rebirth (even the highest forms) are unsatisfactory (duḥkha) as well as practicing the three trainings of ethics (sila), meditative stabilization (samadhi) and insight (vipasyana). This level also includes contemplating the six root delusions (kleśa) that give rise to samsara (attachment, anger, pride, ignorance, wrong views, and doubt) as well as the analysis of samsara contained in the 12 links of dependent origination. Though this level also includes insight into emptiness (shunyata), it is not as thoroughly explained as in the Mahayana.
- The highest scope suitable for those who have great compassion and thus seek to attain full Buddhahood so as to aid the liberation of others (Mahāyāna motivation). This begins with the generation of the mind of awakening (bodhicitta), and the cultivation of love (maitrī) and compassion (karuṇā) towards all beings, and proceeds on to the cultivation of practices like the seven point mind training, "exchanging ourselves and others", tonglen, the bodhisattva vows and the six paramitas (including samatha and vipasyana meditation), culminating with the direct realization of emptiness.

The highest scope of Lamrim culminates in the Vajrayana methods to aid in the speedy attainment of Buddhahood. Higher motivations are said to build on, but not to subvert the foundation of the earlier ones.

==== Three main elements ====
In his The Three Principles of the Path, Tsongkhapa outlines the three main elements of the path to awakening as follows:

1. The intention definitely to leave cyclic existence, i.e. renunciation (naiṣkramya)
2. Generating the intention to attain Buddhahood for the sake of all sentient beings (bodhicitta, the awakening mind)
3. The correct view (samyak dṛṣṭi), i.e. a proper understanding of emptiness (shunyata).

According to Tsongkhapa, these three elements contain the essence of all Buddhist teachings and practices and are the common goal of all scriptures, treatises and tantras. Furthermore, according to Tsongkhapa, these are not just introductory or partial elements, but essential foundations for all Buddhist practices, sutric (i.e. non-tantric Mahayana) or tantric.

=== Reasoning and meditating on emptiness ===
In Gelug, the achievement of the perfection of wisdom (prajñaparamita) requires a proper understanding of the view of emptiness. In the Lamrim chenmo, Tsongkhapa rejects the idea that all intellectual effort, concepts, and mental activity are obstacles to spiritual understanding. He also rejects certain views of emptiness, particularly the shentong (other emptiness) view, which is seen as a kind of eternalism or essentialism. The proper view of emptiness in the Gelug school is considered to be the prāsangika mādhyamika philosophy of Nagarjuna and Chandrakirti as interpreted by Tsongkhapa. According to Jay Garfield, Tsongkhapa's view is "a synthesis of the epistemology and logic of Dharmakirti with the metaphysics of Nagarjuna."

The correct view of emptiness is initially established through study and reasoning in order to ascertain if phenomena are the way they appear. Gelug texts contain many explanations to help one obtain a conceptual understanding of emptiness and to practice insight meditation (vipasyana). Gelug meditation includes an analytical kind of insight practice which is "the point-by-point contemplation of the logical arguments of the teachings, culminating in those for the voidness of self and all phenomena."

According to John Powers:

The initial use of reasoning enables the meditator to recognize that all phenomena are empty of inherent existence, and the fact that one is able to demonstrate this through reasoned proofs makes the conviction unshakable. Merely gaining a conceptual apprehension, however, is not enough: one must deepen the understanding of emptiness through repeated familiarization. The more one trains in emptiness, the deeper one’s discernment becomes, until one transcends the need for conceptual thought, and one’s awareness of emptiness reaches the level of direct perception, such that when one considers a phenomenon in meditation, one immediately apprehends its absence of inherent existence.

For Tsongkhapa, the training in insight and wisdom is closely associated with training in compassion. Training in insight into emptiness deepens compassion and vice verse. Both reinforce and strengthen each other.

=== Vinaya ===
The Gelug school focuses on ethics and monastic discipline of the vinaya as the central plank of spiritual practice. In particular, the need to pursue spiritual practice in a graded, sequential manner is emphasized. Arguably, Gelug is the only school of vajrayāna Buddhism that prescribes monastic ordination as a necessary qualification and basis in its teachers (lamas / gurus). Lay people are usually not permitted to give initiations if there are teachers with monastic vows within close proximity.

=== Vajrayāna (Secret Mantra) ===
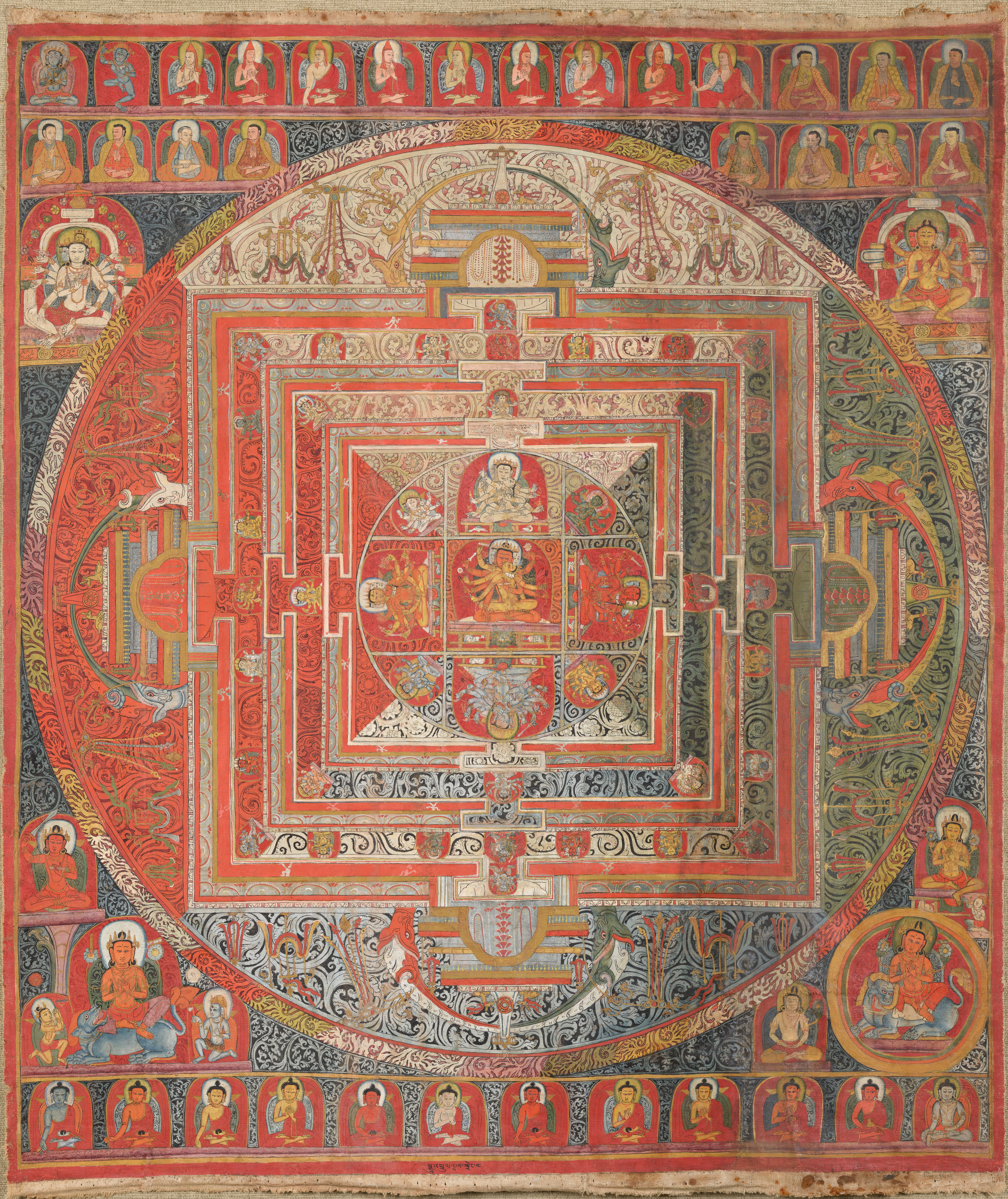
Guhyasamāja mandala with Mañjuvajra as the central deity

The tantric practices of the Gelug school are also integrated into the stages of the path model by Tsongkhapa's The Great Exposition of Secret Mantra. This is combined with the tantric deity yogas of Anuttarayoga Tantras such as the Guhyasamāja, Cakrasaṃvara, Yamāntaka and Kālacakra tantras.

For Tsongkhapa, Vajrayana practice requires bodhicitta and insight into emptiness (through vipaśyanā meditation) as a foundation, and thus, non-tantric Mahayana (and its three principal aspects of renunciation, bodhicitta and insight into emptiness) is seen as indispensable for Vajrayana in Gelug. Indeed, according to Tsongkhapa, without having ascertained emptiness, one cannot practice the tantric yogas of Vajrayana.

The Gelug school also follows Tsongkhapa's view that Vajrayana is only differentiated from sutra by its special method, the esoteric practice of deity yoga, which is considered to be a much faster method than the practice of the six perfections alone.

Tsongkhapa's tantric practice and theory focuses on the Guhyasamāja tantra, a text which he considered to be the "king of tantras". Tsongkhapa referred to himself as a "Guhyasamāja yogi" and saw himself as a reviver and reformer of the tradition. As such, the Guhyasamāja tantra is the principal tantra for the Gelug school. As the Dalai Lama remarks:

There is a saying in the Gelug, "If one is on the move it is Guhyasamāja. If one is still, it is Guhyasamāja. If one is meditating, it should be upon Guhyasamāja." Therefore, whether one is engaged in study or practice, Guhyasamāja should be one's focus.

Tsongkhapa also incorporated the tantric practice of the Six Yogas of Naropa, and Mahamudra, from the Dagpo Kagyu lineages. This tradition was continued by the first Panchen Lama, who composed A Root Text for the Precious Gelug/Kagyü Tradition of Mahamudra.

The Gelug tradition also maintains Dzogchen teachings; Lozang Gyatso, 5th Dalai Lama (1617–1682), Thubten Gyatso, 13th Dalai Lama (1876–1933), and Tenzin Gyatso, 14th Dalai Lama are some Gelug-pa Dzogchen masters. (Note: Georges Dreyfus, The Shugden Affair: Origins of a Controversy (Part I). Official website of the Office of His Holiness the 14th Dalai Lama.) Likewise the practice of Chöd was taught by Gelug-pas such as Kyabje Zong Rinpoche.

==== Unique Oral lineage ====
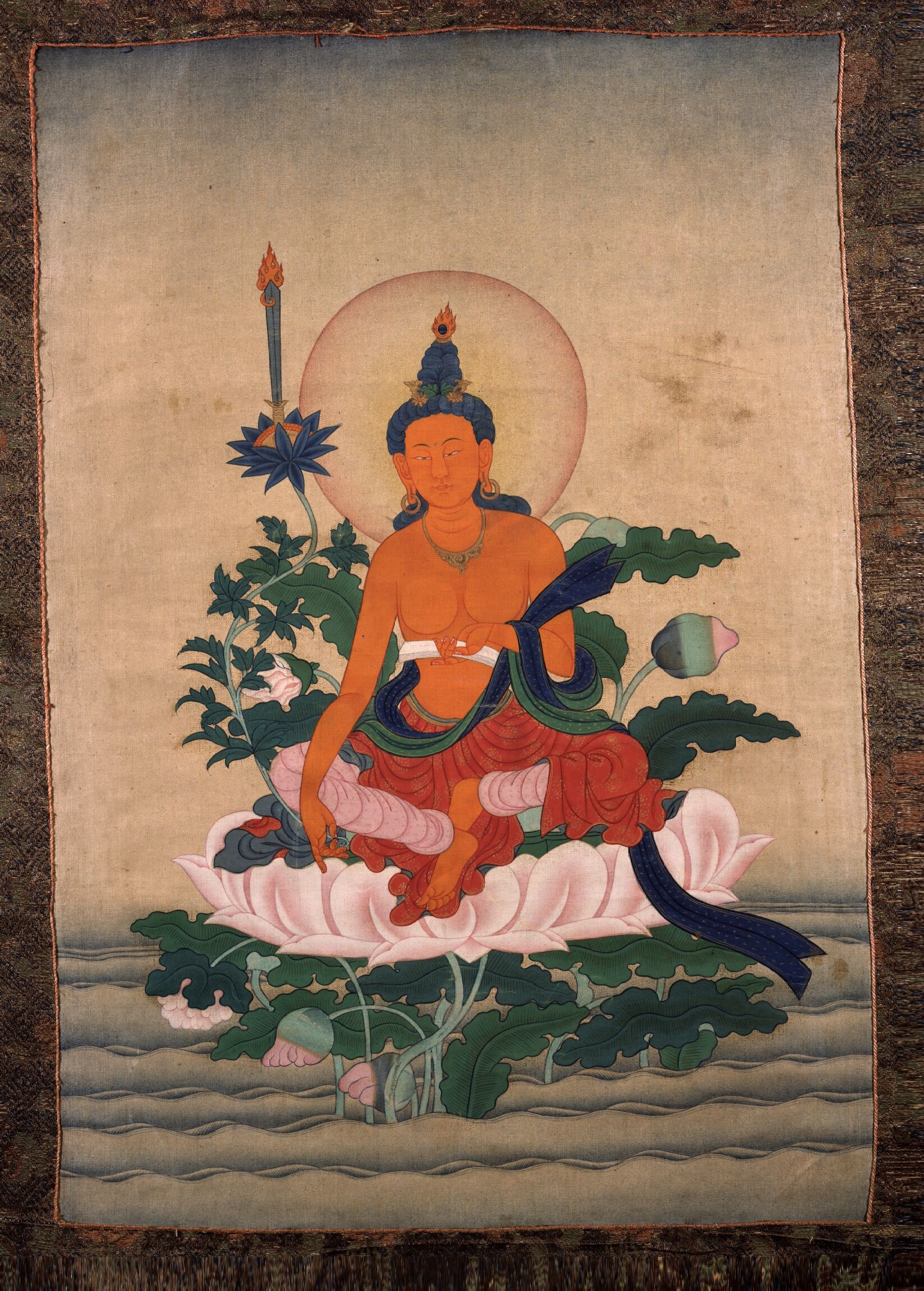
Mañjuśrī, 18th century, Rubin Museum of Art

The Gelug tradition also has a unique lineage of oral instructions which is traced back to the teachings received by Tsongkhapa from the bodhisattva Mañjuśrī (Tib. Jampalyang). There are two main lineages of this Ganden Mañjuśrī cycle of oral instructions, these are the Ensa tradition (stemming from Gyalwa Ensapa Losang Dondrup) and the Segyu lineage (stemming from Je Sherab Sengye). The teachings of the popular Lama Chöpa practice come down through the Ensa lineage.

According to David Gonsalez:

Manjushri instructed Tsongkhapa to combine the teachings on the clear light and illusory body from the Guhyasamāja Tantra, the teachings on inner fire and the use of an action mudra from the Cakrasaṃvara Tantra, and the practice of Vajrabhairava, using these as a means of increasing wisdom and overcoming obstacles. With this as the foundation for his tantric practice he should establish a basis of lamrim and lojong that is centered on the practice of guru yoga. Manjushri proceeded to give Tsongkhapa detailed teachings on all aspects of the aforementioned teachings and advised him to consolidate them all into a single practice. This was the impetus for the origins of Lama Chöpa. From these instructions there arose a very secret system of guru yoga that was transmitted orally from guru to disciple.

== Study ==
Monks debating at Sera monastery, Tibet, 2013

=== Main topics and texts ===
The Gelug school developed a highly structured system of scholastic study which was based on the memorization and study of key texts as well as formal debate. The primary topics and texts used in study are:

1. Monastic discipline (’dul ba, vinaya): Vinaya-sutra by Gunaprabha
2. Abhidharma: Vasubandhu’s Abhidharmakosha
3. Epistemology (tshad ma, pramana): which is based on Dharmakirti’s Pramanavarttika, a Commentary on Dignaga’s ‘Compendium of Pramana’,
4. Madhyamaka (dbu-ma): Chandrakirti’s Madhyamakāvatāra.
5. Prajnaparamita (phar-phyin): Maitreya's Abhisamayalankara.

All Gelug colleges study commentaries to these texts written by Tsongkhapa, Gyaltsab Je and Kedrub Je.

Six texts by Tsongkhapa are also a prime source for the studies of the Gelug tradition:

1. The Great Exposition of the Stages of the Path (Lam-rim chen-mo)
2. The Great Exposition of Secret Mantra (sNgag-rim chenmo)
3. The Essence of Eloquence on the Interpretive and Definitive Teachings (Drnng-nges legs-bshad snying-po)
4. The Praise of Dependent Origination (rTen-'brel bstodpa)
5. The Clear Exposition of the Five Stages of Guhyasamāja (gSang-'dus rim-lnga gsal-sgron) and
6. The Golden Rosary (gSer-phreng)

Each Gelug monastery also uses its own set of commentarial textbooks (yig-cha) which were written to explain further scholastic details and interpretative issues. The various sets of Gelug textbooks differ on numerous fine points of interpretation. Major textbook sets include:

- Jetsun Chokyi Gyaltsen's (1469–1544) textbooks, studied at Ganden Jangtse, Sera Je and Sera Ngagpa
- Kedrub Tendarwa's texts (1493–1568), studied at Sera Me College
- Panchen Sonam Dragpa's texts (1478–1554) which are studied at Drepung Losel Ling, Ganden Shartse, Gyütö and Ratö colleges,
- Kunkyen Jamyang Zhepa (1648–1721), studied at Drepung Gomang College, Drepung Deyang College, Labrang Monastery, and most monasteries in Inner and Outer Mongolia, Buryatia, Kalmykia, and Tuva.

=== Course of study ===
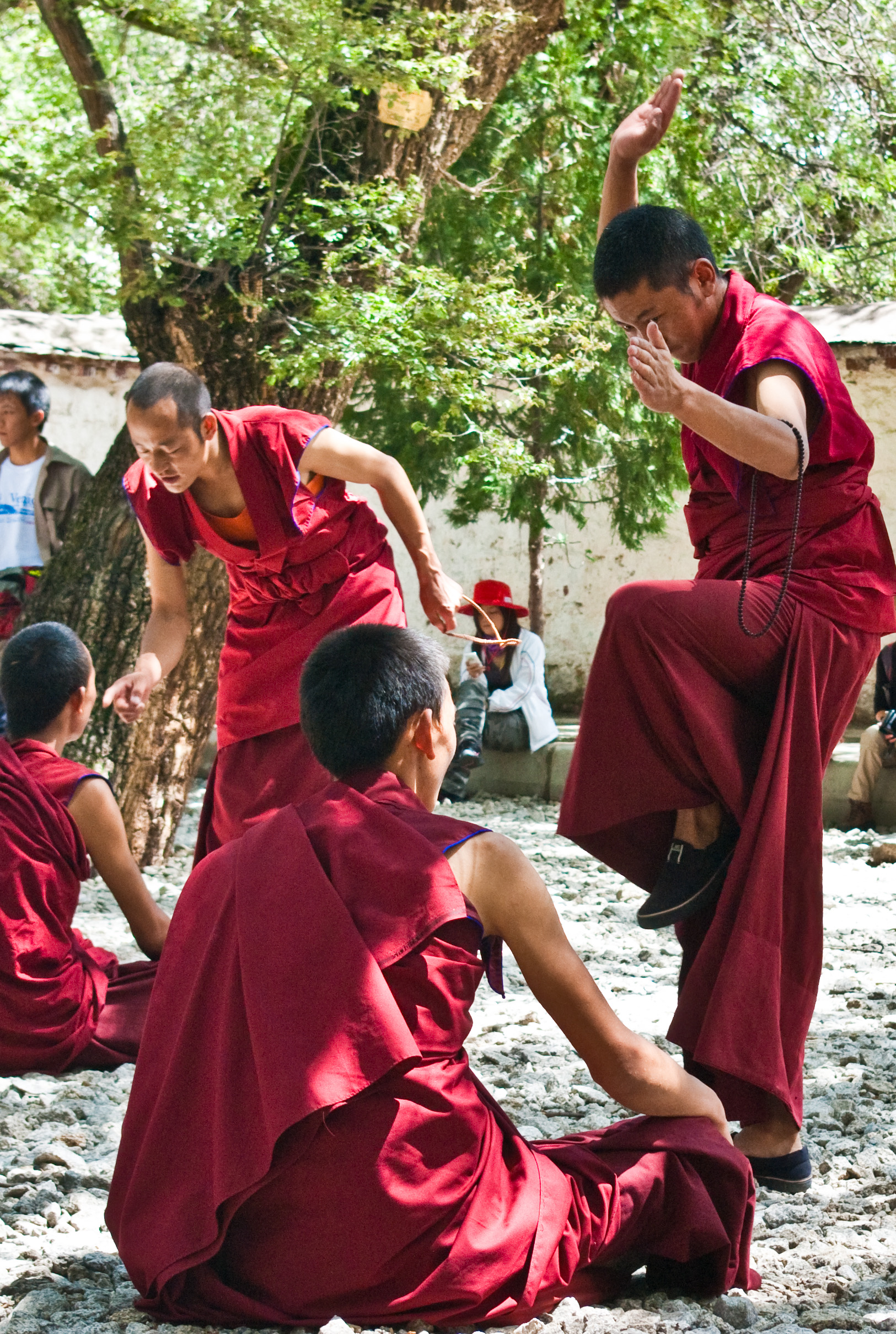
Monks debating in Sera monastery

According to Georges Dreyfus,

For each topic studied, the procedure is similar. The process starts with the heuristic memorization of the root text and sometimes of its commentaries. It continues with the interpretation of the root text through commentaries, and culminates in dialectical debate.

After the study of the exoteric texts, a monk may then enter the esoteric study and practice of tantric texts, particularly the Guhyasamāja, Yamāntaka, and Cakrasamvara tantras.

A monk who has completed all his studies may then attempt a geshe degree, a title rare and difficult to obtain which can take 15 to 25 years to complete. According to John Powers, "although the Gélukpa tradition recognizes some people as tülkus—beings who are reincarnations of great lamas—the various levels of scholarly achievement are open to any male who is able to complete the program successfully." There are no major restrictions on a monk's ability to attain the various scholastic ranks and geshe degrees other than skill, and they may come from any social class, family or region. Several Westerners have completed the degree in the modern era.

Powers also writes that:

the primary method of examination is oral debate, in which a monk must be able quickly to evaluate a wide range of philosophical positions, defend any of them against any other, and triumph (or at least hold his own) in a no-holds-barred intellectual contest. The debates are generally very lively...The stated purpose of the exercise is to develop the intellects of the monks, and it is felt that direct dialectical confrontation accomplishes this goal by training them to defend philosophical positions, to think on their feet, and to critically examine their doctrines and positions.

Alexander Berzin notes that in Tibet, there used to only be two examinations (rgyugs-sprod): memorization exam (blo-rgyugs) and debate exams (rtsod-rgyugs). However, according to Berzin, "since the reforms of the Fourteenth Dalai Lama in India, they must also pass each year a written exam (bri-rgyugs), a poetry composition exam (rtsom-bri), and a Tibetan culture and religious history exam (rgyal-rabs chos-byung)."

After attaining a monastic degree, it is common to enter a long meditation retreat, often lasting three years or proceed to tantric (Vajrayana) studies. According to Powers "the logic behind this system is based on the idea that one should first gain a thorough grounding in Buddhist scriptures, philosophy, doctrines, and practice before engaging in full-time meditation. Trainees who thoroughly understand what they are meditating on will be less likely to go astray in meditation than those whose understanding is merely superficial."

== Monasteries and lineage holders ==
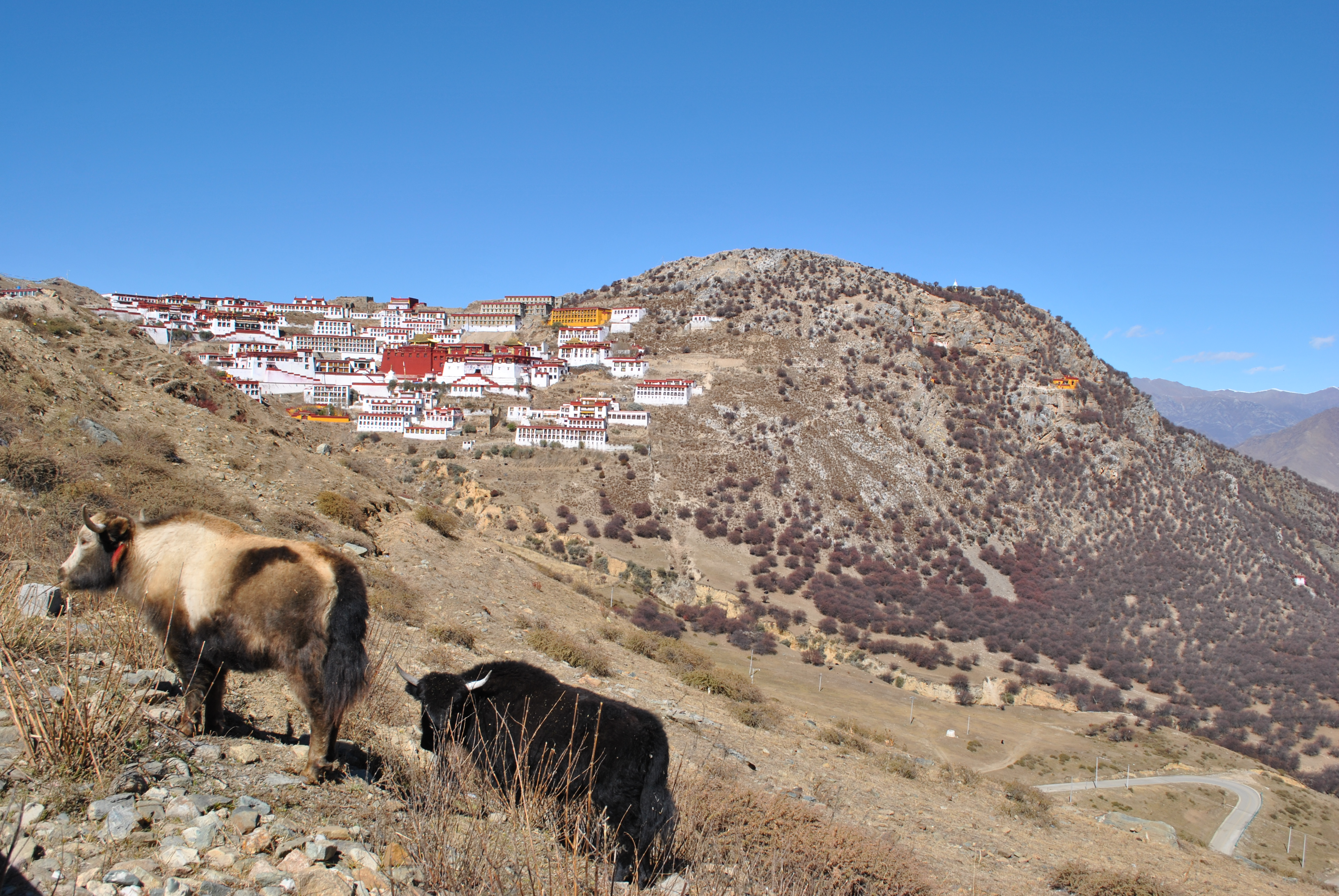
Ganden monastery, Tibet, 2013

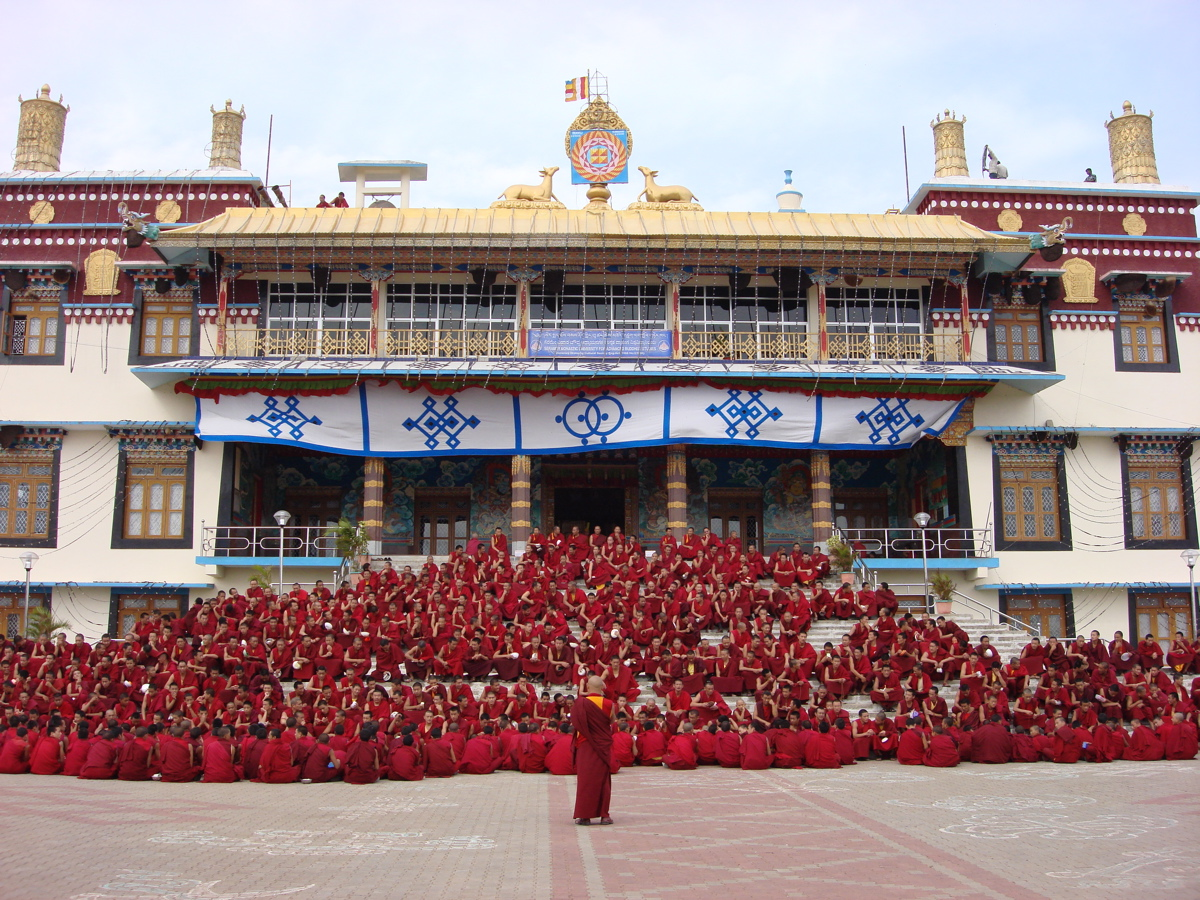
Sera Mey, Sera Monastery, India

=== Monasteries ===
Tsongkhapa founded the monastery of Ganden in 1409 as his main seat. Drepung Monastery was founded by Jamyang Choje, Sera Monastery was founded by Chöje Shakya Yeshe, and Tashi Lhunpo Monastery was founded by Gyalwa Gendün Drup, the 1st Dalai Lama. These four were the largest and most powerful Gelug monasteries in Tibet. Before the Chinese occupation Ganden and Sera each had about 5,000 monks, while Drepung housed over 7,000.

Labrang Monastery, in Xiahe County in Gansu province (and in the traditional Tibetan province of Amdo), was founded in 1709 by the first Jamyang Zhaypa, Ngawang Tsondru. Many Gelug monasteries and temples were also built throughout Tibet as well as in China and Mongolia. Notable Gelug monasteries in Kham include Lithang, Bathang, Sershul, and Dargye. In the Gyalrong region one finds some of the oldest Gelug monasteries on the eastern plateau such as Dhe-Tsang.

=== Administration and lineage ===
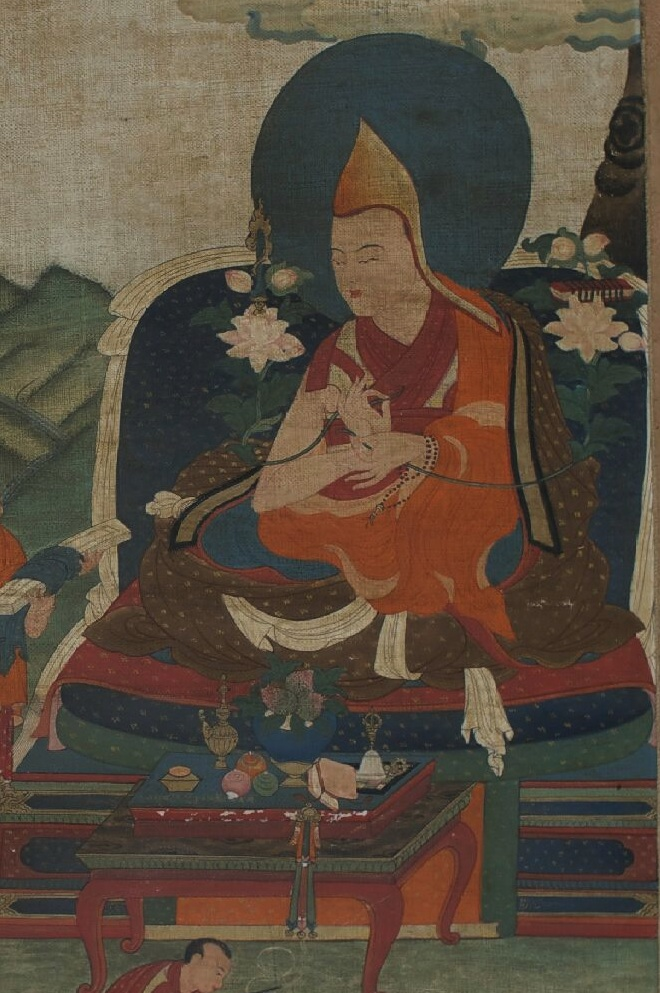
6th ganden tripa Chokyi Gyeltsen (1402–1473)

After Tsongkhapa's passing, his teachings were held and spread by Gyaltsab Je and Khedrup Gelek Pelzang, who were his successors as abbots of Ganden Monastery. These were the first "Ganden Tripa" (dGa’-ldan khri-pa, Ganden Throne Holder), an office which became the official head of the entire Gelug school. The lineage is still held by the present holder is Thubten Nyima Lungtok Tenzin Norbu, the 102nd Ganden Tripa (and not, as often misunderstood, by the Dalai Lama).

Ganden Tripa is an elected position held by the most senior ex-abbots of Gyume and Gyuto Upper and Lower Tantric Colleges. The office lasts for seven years only. This is in contrast to the other Tibetan schools, who are led either by specific tulkus (reincarnation lineages like the Karmapas) or by a specific clan (like the Sakya school, led by the Khön family).

Among the main lineage holders of the Gelug are:

- The successive incarnations of the Dalai Lama (also commonly referred to as "Gyalwa Rinpoche")
- The succession of the Panchen Lama, the Chagkya Dorje Chang, Ngachen Könchok Gyaltsen, Kyishö Tulku Tenzin Thrinly, Jamyang Shepa, Phurchok Jampa Rinpoche, Jamyang Dewe Dorje, Takphu Rinpoche, Khachen Yeshe Gyaltsen
- The Jebtsundamba Khutuktus, the spiritual heads of Mongolian Buddhism
- The Changkya Khutukhtus
- The Tatsag Rinpoches
- The Reting Rinpoches
- Successive incarnations of Kyabje Yongzin Ling Rinpoche
- Successive incarnations of Kyabje Yongzin Trijang Lobsang Yeshe Tenzin Gyatso

== See also ==
- Schools of Buddhism
  - Tibetan Buddhism
- Dalai Lama and Panchen Lama
- History of Tibet
  - List of rulers of Tibet
- Gyuto Order
- Foundation for the Preservation of the Mahayana Tradition
- Ushnishasitatapattra
- Yellow shamanism
