= Prasaṅgika according to Tsongkhapa =

Philosophical dispute in Buddhism

The Svatantrika-Prasaṅgika distinction is a set of arguments about two different positions of emptiness philosophy which are debated within the Mahayana school of Buddhism. It is most prominently discussed in Tibetan Buddhism, where Prāsaṅgika and Svātantrika are viewed to be different forms of Madhyamaka philosophy.

For Tsongkhapa, the founder of the Gelugpa school and the most outspoken proponent of the distinction, as well as for the Karma Kagyu school, these differences are of major importance. (Note: Lama Tsongkhapa dedicates three chapters to the subject in Lamrim Chenmo, V3) Tsongkhapa not only negates an inherent identity or self-characterizing essence which resides in persons, things, and abstract phenomena; but he also negates the identity of phenomena as they appear to our instinctive, everyday perception. In contrast, according to Tsongkhapa, the Svātantrika negate a "truly existing self," but maintain that things exist conventionally "according to characteristics."

== The heart of the distinction according to Tsongkhapa ==
=== Prāsaṅgika ===
For Tsongkhapa, the Svatantrika-Prasaṅgika distinction centers around the role of prasaṅga (consequence) in a formal debate, and the interpretation of the meaning of both "ultimate truth" and "conventional truth." (Note: "There is, however, another set of criteria for distinguishing between the approaches of these three Madhyamika masters, namely, their way of speaking about the conventional truth. We have seen that one of the reasons Chandrakirti objected to Bhavaviveka’s innovation was that, according to the rules of logic, independent syllogisms commit their user to an implicit and compromising acquiescence in the existence of the elements referred to. Bhavaviveka was apparently aware of this, and we have seen that, in the interests of consistency, his use of the independent syllogism went hand in hand with a view that, on the conventional level, phenomena do indeed enjoy a certain existence 'according to their characteristics.'")

The Prāsaṅgika view holds reductio ad absurdum of essentialist viewpoints to be the most valid method of demonstrating emptiness of inherent existence, and that conventional things do not have a naturally occurring conventional identity. Further, the Prāsaṅgika argue that when initially attempting to find the correct object of understanding - which is a mere absence or mere negation of impossible modes of existence - one should not use positivist statements about the nature of reality. Positing an essencelessness rather than merely negating inherent identity creates a subtle linguistic and analytic barrier to finding the correct understanding. (Note: "Therefore, someone might think that while the object of negation is merely negated, it is not tenable that its negation is the conclusion of the argument. But 'Prajnapradipa' quotes these lines in support of the claim, 'This is a mere negation of inherent existence; however, entitylessness is not asserted,' and the subcommentary also explains that it supports the claim that this is [a non-affirming] negation.") (Note: The Nyingmapa scholar Jamgon Mipham (1846–1912) states, in Introduction to the Middle Way, a commentary on Chandrakirti: "[Our opponents] say that the pot is empty of something different from the pot itself (that is, true existence) [...] The conclusion at which they arrive [is] that a man is not empty of himself but of a true existence extraneous to him [...] Chandrakirti said that the Svatantrikas were content with tenets that were only verbally coherent [...] Our opponents say that the personal and phenomenal selves are not empty of themselves but rather they are empty of true existence [...] The cognition 'This is a pot' is the apprehension of the reality of the pot. Simply apprehending something as existing as such, the personal and phenomenal selves are conceived. This mere thought therefore is enough to trigger the arising of defilements, for karma to be accumulated, and for suffering to be experienced. Therefore, if this thought is not removed, what advantage is there to refuting a truly existent self [...]?") This is exemplified in the debate over the use of the terms "devoid of nature itself" in Gelug Mahamudra (non-affirming negation) and "that which has voidness as its nature" in non-Gelug Mahamudra and Dzogchen (an affirming negation).

Tsongkhapa argued that because the Svatantrika conventionally establish things by their own characteristics, they do not arrive at a complete understanding of emptiness. According to Tsongkhapa, not only were their methods different, but also that students using Svatantrika do not achieve the same realization as those using the Prasangika approach. Lama Tsongkhapa states that when he uses the term "advocates of intrinsic existence" he is referring to both "essentialists and the Svatantrikas." Modern scholars like the 14th Dalai Lama disagree, echoing sentiments from classical authorities like Lobsang Chökyi Gyaltsen (4th Panchen Lama) stating that the credible teachers of the various systems of Buddhist philosophy all "arrive at the same intended point" of realization. However, they openly admit that this non-denominational position is very difficult to establish through reason.

=== Prāsaṅgika Logic ===
==== Consequential syllogistic reasoning ====
According to Tsongkhapa, if both people in a debate or discussion have a valid understanding of emptiness already, then autonomous syllogistic arguments could be quite effective. However, in a circumstance where one or both parties in a debate or discussion do not hold a valid understanding, "the debate [should be] founded on what the parties accept as valid. Hence, it is proper to refute opponents in terms of what they accept." In other words, it is more appropriate to establish a position of emptiness through showing the logical consequences of the incorrect position that the opponent already accepts, than it is to establish emptiness through syllogistic reasoning using premises that the opponent (and perhaps even the proponent) do not fully or deeply understand. Tsongkhapa quoting Chandrakirti, in the Lamrim Chenmo, Volume Three, on the problem of relying on autonomous syllogistic reasoning:

When one party posits something as a probative reason, even though valid cognition may establish it for the one who posits the syllogism, how can that person be certain that valid cognition establishes it for the other party?

Tsongkhapa argues further that the Prāsaṅgika's use of reductio ad absurdum is syllogistic, because one "refutes the opponent using a subject, a reason, and so forth that are accepted by that opponent." For example, if cause-effect relationships occur because the sprout itself produces the effect of being a sprout (self-arising), then this "would mean that something that already exists is being produced, [and] production would be purposeless and endless [... if] contradictions are assembled in this way, the only result is that the opponents understand them and abandon" wrong tenets. (Note: To clarify with a more modern rendition: if 500 people were shown 100,000 slides of a seed turning into a small plant, would we expect them all to agree that on slide number 1,008 the seed causes the sprout? If one argues that the seed objectively and independently causes the sprout (other-arising) or that the sprout causes itself (self-arising) at the material level, then everyone would be forced to agree that this event occurs at a particular time. However, because the sprout arises relative to a conscious observer who designates the term-concept "sprout" onto the continuum of slides, we find that almost no one can agree where the seed ceases and the sprout arises. This is because the cause-effect relationship cannot be found at the objective material level. The cause-effect relationship is also dependently designated, a viewpoint which is established by Lama Tsongkhapa, Nagarjuna, and Buddapalita.)

==== Non-affirming negation ====
A prominent and important feature of the Prāsaṅgika approach is their use of the non-affirming negation. A non-affirming negation is a negation which does not leave something in the place of what has been negated. For instance, when one says that a Buddhist should not drink alcohol, they are not affirming that a Buddhist should, in fact, drink something else. One is merely negating the consumption of alcohol under a particular circumstance. (Note: "[A non-affirming negation is defined as] a negative object in which no further entity is implied when the mind negates the object that is related to it.")

According to Tsongkhapa, for the Prāsaṅgika the philosophical position of emptiness is itself a non-affirming negation, since emptiness is a "lack of inherent existence." One is not affirming anything in the place of that absence of inherence. It is not the presence of some other quality. If one were to describe emptiness as the presence of some quality -for example, a "voidness" or a "thusness" - it would linguistically and philosophically contradict the nature of the object which it is attempting to characterize.

=== Ignorance - Prasaṅgika Object of Negation ===
Pabongka Rinpoche states in Liberation in Our Hands that if we cannot correctly "recognize the nature of the false mode of existence that is being denied, we will not be able to realize the simple negation [Skr. prasajyapratisedhah or non-affirming negation] that is established through its refutation." For the Prāsaṅgika, when analyzing a table, the object being negated is not an abstract intellectual concept apart from the table which can be called 'inherent existing', but the conventionally appearing table itself, which appears to naive perception as being inherent. The table is not just empty of inherent existence in some abstract philosophical way; the identity of the table as it appears to normal, everyday perception - which misattributes inherence to the object - is being negated. Lama Tsongkhapa explains:

Suppose that we leave aside analysis of how [phenomena] appear—i.e., how they appear to a conventional awareness—and analyze the objects themselves, asking, 'What is the manner of being of these phenomena?' We find they are not established in any way. Ignorance does not apprehend phenomena in this way; it apprehends each phenomenon as having a manner of being such that it can be understood in and of itself, without being posited through the force of a conventional consciousness.

We can say "therefore, [that] what exists objectively in terms of its own essence without being posited through the power of a subjective mind is called [...] 'intrinsic nature'" or ignorance (Note: He goes on to say: "The absence of this quality in the person is called the selflessness of the person; its absence in phenomena such as eyes, ears, and so forth is called the selflessness of objects. Hence, one may implicitly understand that the conceptions of that intrinsic nature as present in persons and objects are the conceptions of the two selves.") Therefore, the object to be negated by reason is a conception that phenomena have an "ontological status—a way of existing—in and of themselves, without being posited through the force of an awareness. (Note: He goes on to say: "The referent object that is thus apprehended by that ignorant conception, the independent ontological status of those phenomena, is identified as [the] hypothetical "self" or "intrinsic nature.") Pabongka Rinpoche adds that "while simply knowing and using verbal explanations such as these may be enough to silence an opponent in debate we have not truly recognized the object to be refuted until we have recognized it within our own experience." In furtherance of this:

When you try to identify the object to be refuted, you must investigate how the innate mistaken view of the self holds that the self is real because it possesses an inherently real essence. This involves examining both how the self appears to our natural, untutored mind and how it is grasped by this mind.

This is the meaning of both ignorance and the object to be negated by valid cognition, according to the Madhyamaka-Prāsaṅgika in the view of Lama Tsongkhapa.

==== Indo-Tibetan rope & snake analogy ====
Under low light, the thought might arise that a striped rope on the ground is a snake, "but there is nothing on top of or inside this rope [...] to which we could" validly apply the term and therefore establish a conventionally existing snake. The Dalai Lama expands:

Like this example, a thought of 'me' may arise on the basis of the aggregate factors of our experience. But there is nothing about these aggregates as the basis for labeling - not any of their parts, nor the collection or network of their parts, nor their continuum over time, nor something separate and apart from them - which is a basis with the defining characteristic making it 'me,' to which we could possibly apply the name 'me.' That being the case, this 'me' is nothing more than simply what can be designated by a mental label on the basis of aggregate factors of experience.

In reality, the self of persons, objects, and abstracts is like the term-concept "snake" being designated upon a rope, "the snake is merely what can be designated by a mental label." Like this, the object of negation or ignorance is viewed to be the thought and perception which grasps the self of persons and objects to be established within their respective bases of designation. To put this in somewhat simpler terms, the thought and perception which grasps persons, things, and abstract phenomena as existing in-and-of themselves - with characteristics or an identity of their own - is seen to be ignorance in this system.

==== Incorrect Object of Negation (Permanence) ====
In the Gelugpa four tenets system, the object of negation is different for the Madhyamika-Prāsaṅgika than it is for Hinayana schools of Vaibhāṣika and Sautrāntika. (Note: Which are both schools of the Sarvastivada.) (Note: Daniel Cozort explaining this idea in greater detail:"A second category of tenets is concerned with implications of the Mahayana and Hinayana path structures. For the most part, they are tenets propounded to demonstrate that some persons who are regarded by other schools as Arhats liberated beings-are only ersatz Arhats, having realized only a coarse selflessness and having thereby suppressed, but not removed from the root, the obstructions to liberation. These tenets, then, revolve around the unique Prasangika assertion that the root of cyclic existence is the conception of inherent existence, which is more subtle than the conception of a self described by other systems of tenets. Five assertions are elucidated in this regard: One must realize emptiness in order to become liberated and therefore some "Arhats" who have only realized a coarse selflessness are not actually liberated.; There is desire that either is, or is thoroughly mixed with, the conception of true existence, and so-called Arhats still have this sort of desire.; Although some of these "Arhats" do indeed have yogic direct perception of the four noble truths, one does not have to be an Arhat or even a Superior (one who has directly realized emptiness) in order to have such yogic direct perception.; Although some of these "Arhats" have indeed realized the coarse aspects of the four noble truths, such a realization is not sufficient to overcome the obstructions to liberation.; Since true cessations, the irrevocable cessation of some portion of the afflictions of desire, hatred, etc., are also emptinesses, such "Arhats" who have not realized emptiness could not have experienced true cessations, i.e., could not have overcome the afflictive obstructions.") Indeed, from the Prāsaṅgika viewpoint, Buddhist and non-Buddhist essentialist schools are not negating the correct object. (Note: "Based on just this [intrinsic nature], the referent object of the way that ignorance apprehends things as explained above, essentialist schools—Buddhist and non-Buddhist—reify many different things. When you negate the referent of ignorance’s cognitive process, you completely stop all of these tenet-driven reifications, as though you cut a tree at its root. Therefore, those who have the faculty of wisdom should understand that the referent object of innate ignorance is the basic object of negation and should not devote themselves merely to refuting imaginary constructs that are imputed only by the advocates of philosophical tenets. [...] What binds all living beings in cyclic existence is innate ignorance; acquired ignorance exists only among those who advocate philosophical tenets, so it cannot be the root of cyclic existence. It is extremely important to gain specific and certain knowledge of this point.") According to Geshe Tenzin Zopa in Buddhist Tenets, the various Hinayana schools are negating a number of different objects, but none of them are inherent existence. Geshe Tenzin Zopa states: "From Vaibhāṣika school, they [the Vasiputriyans] assert selflessness/emptiness of the person/self is that which is impermanent (can momentarily change), has parts (physical parts, moments of time, various cardinal directions) and is dependent." (Note: Geshe Tenzin Zopa, by way of Chokyi Gyaltsen, states: "In Vaibashika school, there are 3 divisions and 18 subschools, one of which is the Theravadan school." This categorization is, however, in contention, given the apparent non-consensus between Gelugpa Scholars within themselves and those of the living Theravada tradition. Alexander Berzin states, for example, that the Theravada does not belong to the Vaibhashika. In the same publication Geshe Tenzin Zopa references: "the late Chief Reverend of Brickfield's Vihara K.Sri Dhammananda and Ven Dr Walpola Rahula, a well-known Theravada scholar highlights: "We must not confuse Hīnayāna ("Lesser Vehicle") with Theravāda ("Path of the Elders") because the terms are not synonymous. The term Hīnayāna Buddhism is used by scholars for a group of 18 early Buddhist schools, which none exist today. Theravāda as it appears today is usually traced back to the 3rd century BCE in Sri Lanka [...]" Geshe Tenzin Zopa then, however, goes on to equate Theravada and Hinayana, and states that Theravada is part of the Vaibashika school.) Chandrakirti explains why the Prasangika do not see this as the final correct position:

When knowing selflessness, some eliminate a permanent self, (Note: "(...) anatta is the doctrine of non-self, and is an extreme empiricist doctrine that holds that the notion of an unchanging permanent self is a fiction and has no reality. According to Buddhist doctrine, the individual person consists of five skandhas or heaps - the body, feelings, perceptions, impulses and consciousness. The belief in a self or soul, over these five skandhas, is illusory and the cause of suffering." [c] Richard Gombrich (2006). Theravada Buddhism. Routledge. p. 47. ISBN 978-1-134-90352-8.) but we do not consider this to be the basis of the conception of "I." It is therefore astonishing to claim that knowing this selflessness expunges and uproots the view of the self. [This is equivalent to] if someone sees a snake living in the wall of his house. To ease his concern, someone else says, 'there is no elephant there.' Alas, to others it is ridiculous that this would expel the fear of the snake.

Lama Tsongkhapa supports the analysis of Chandrakirti when he says:

If you do not understand this and fail to eradicate the perspective of innate ignorance, then, when you refute a personal self, you will only refute a self that is permanent, unitary, and independent. (Note: The opposite of these terms being impermanent, has parts, and dependent)[...] Even if you actualized such a selflessness in meditation and consummated your cultivation of it, nothing would come of it. It would be extremely absurd to claim that you can overcome innate afflictions by seeing as nonexistent the two selves imputed by acquired misconceptions.

==== Refuting that rational analysis is not required ====
From the point of view of the opponents of Prasangika, (Note: It is unclear which specific school of thought Tsongkhapa and Nagarjuna are debating with here when they say "some hold that." However, the following does seem to be a common statement.) it is absurd "to conduct the extensive rational analysis required for refutations and proofs [which] is to meander among mere conventional words." They propose that "all phenomena are devoid of refutation and proof, in that, if something exists, it cannot be refuted, and, if it does not exist, it need not be refuted." An idea which Lama Tsongkhapa refers to as "a nonsensical collection of contradictions, showing neither general awareness of how reason establishes and negates things nor general awareness of how the path establishes and negates things." (Note: Nagarjuna in Commentary on Refutation of Objections: Childish beings are confused about the absence of real essence in all things, so we make them understand that there is no intrinsic nature in the things that they, confused by ignorance, reify as having intrinsic nature. Therefore, what you have said — that if there is no intrinsic nature, what use are the words, "There is no intrinsic existence," inasmuch as things would be established as without intrinsic nature even without any words, without saying anything — is not reasonable.)

Nagarjuna's Refutation of Objections he deals with this idea in a similar way:

What use is it to establish the negation
Of what does not exist anyway, even without words?
To answer that, the words "does not exist"
Cause understanding; they do not eliminate.

In his Commentary on Refutation of Objections Nagarjuna expands as follows:

The words, "All things lack intrinsic nature," do not cause things to
lack intrinsic nature, but, in the absence of intrinsic nature, they do make it
understood that things lack intrinsic nature."

This can be illustrated with the following paraphrased example found in the same text. If a person named Devadatta is not in the house, but someone says, "Devadatta is in the house." Then in order to show that Devadatta is not there, someone else will say, "Devadatta is not there." Those words do not cause Devadatta not to be there but allow the first person to understand that Devadatta is not in the house. Similarly, the words, "Things lack intrinsic nature," do not cause things to lack intrinsic nature, but help those confused by ignorance to gain a valid cognition of reality.

=== Dependent Origination - Conventional Truth ===
At the time of Candrakīrti, the Prāsaṅgika discerned three levels of dependent origination:

1. Pratītyasamutpāda or 'dependent arising.' All things arise in dependence on causes and conditions and cease when those causes and conditions are no longer present. (Note: "All things arise in dependence on causes and conditions, and this is the meaning of dependent origination".)
2. All wholes are dependent upon their parts for existence, and all parts are dependent on their wholes for existence. (Note: "Although both from the standpoint of reality and from that of everyday life, The sevenfold reasoning shows that a chariot cannot be established, in everyday life, without analysis it is designated in dependence on its parts.")
3. Prajñaptir upādāya or 'dependent designation.' All phenomena are dependent for their existence on conceptual imputation. (Note: "Although dependent origination is generally maintained to be dependence upon conditions, from our perspective, this is not inconsistent with [them existing in] dependence upon mundane nominal conventions.")

According to Tsongkhapa, Prāsaṅgika asserts that all phenomena are empty of inherent existence or essence, because they are dependently co-arisen with mental imputation. All phenomenon in all possible worlds lack inherent existence and come into existence relative to a designating consciousness which co-arises with that phenomena.

==== Dependent Designation as Conventional Truth ====
Designation is, according to Kelsang Gyatso's translation of Lorig, (Note: The Gelug text on mind and mental factors.) the application of a conceptual image or term to a selected object of mere experience. (Note: The 14th Dalai Lama: "When the issue of how do ultimately unfindable things actually exist becomes unbearable and we have to say something, the bottom line is that their existence is established by virtue simply of names. In other words, the existence of these things is established and proven by virtue simply of the fact that they can be named within the context of mental labeling. There is no additional need for an inherent, findable, defining characteristic on the side of the basis for labeling rendering things existent and giving them their identity. Thus the existence of ultimately unfindable things is merely conventional.") Anything which comes into existence through valid designation is part of "conventional reality" or "conventional truth." According to Lama Tsongkhapa, something is validly designated (exists conventionally) if it meets all of the following three conditions:

1. It is known to a conventional consciousness;
2. No other conventional cognition (within that convention) contradicts it from being thus known;
3. Reason that accurately analyzes reality — that is, analyzes whether something intrinsically exists — does not contradict it.

Whatever fails to meet those criteria does not exist. If something has a cause-effect relationship or a relationship of parts-whole, then those objects are already in existence. In order to be already existing, they must have been designated by a conceptual mind. To talk about an object that does not exist in relation to a subject is incoherent. (Note: "Thus, [Chandrakirti] says that those are synonyms. 'Without depending on another' does not mean not depending on causes and conditions. Instead, 'other' refers to a subject, i.e., a conventional consciousness, and something is said not to depend on another due to not being posited through the force of that conventional consciousness.") (Note: A parallel in western thought can be found in the viewpoint of intentionality: " Every mental phenomenon is characterized by what the Scholastics of the Middle Ages called the intentional (or mental) inexistence of an object, and what we might call, though not wholly unambiguously, reference to a content, direction towards an object (which is not to be understood here as meaning a thing), or immanent objectivity. Every mental phenomenon includes something as object within itself, although they do not all do so in the same way. In presentation something is presented, in judgment something is affirmed or denied, in love loved, in hate hated, in desire desired and so on. This intentional in-existence is characteristic exclusively of mental phenomena. No physical phenomenon exhibits anything like it. We could, therefore, define mental phenomena by saying that they are those phenomena which contain an object intentionally within themselves. — Franz Brentano, Psychology from an Empirical Standpoint, edited by Linda L. McAlister (London: Routledge, 1995), pp. 88–89.) According to Lama Tsongkhapa's interpretation of Nagarjuna, both causes and effects are merely designated by mind. Parts and wholes - being among the components that make up reality - are also merely designated by mind. Relationships between objects cannot exist without being validly designated into existence. (Note: In Ocean of Reasoning, Tsongkhapa and Nagarjuna spell out various analysis to the effect that phenomenon cannot possibly exist without mental imputation. The list includes: "causes" including Conditions, Motion, the Senses, the Aggregates, the Elements, Desire & the Desirous One, "Arising, Enduring, & Ceasing," Agent & Action, Prior Entity, Fire & Fuel, Beginning & End, Suffering, Compounded Phenomena, Contact, Essence, Bondage, Action, Self & Phenomena, Time, Assemblage, Becoming & Destruction, the Buddha, Errors, the Four Noble Truths, Nirvana, the Twelve Links of Dependent Origination, and Views.) This is the meaning of "conventional truth" in this system.

==== Causes & Conditions are merely designated ====
According to Tsongkhapa by way of Nagarjuna, the most pervasive relationship of co-dependent arising is the third relationship, dependent designation. (Note: Tsongkhapa quoting Nagarjuna: "All things are empty by nature. Therefore, the unexcelled Tathagata taught the dependent origination of phenomena. That is the supreme meaning. The Buddha, relying on worldly conventions, states that all the various phenomena are in reality designated." Tsongkhapa goes on to say: "The ultimate mode of the existence of things is nothing but their absence of essence - that is, their being dependently originated. Hence, it is explained that all such things as arising are established as imputed through the power of convention [...] [T]he meaning of 'conventional existence' [had it not been spelled out in this way] would not be understood to be established as existent merely through the force of nominal convention. (emphasis original)) From the Prāsaṅgika perspective, in order for something to exist, it must be designated validly by a designating consciousness. It is mind that determines that a cause has ceased and its effect is now in existence. To exemplify this, Lama Tsongkhapa quotes Buddhapalita's response to an Abhidharmica's objection:

"It is utterly impossible for time, [causes, effects, and collections of causes and conditions] and such to exist essentially, as you imagine. However, they are established as dependent designation."

According to Lama Tsongkhapa by way of Buddhapalita, this was one of the points of Nagajuna's Chatuṣkoṭi. (Note: Buddhapalita says, "Nor do things arise from others, because then anything could arise from anything." [Tsongkhapa continues] Here, the reason why the absurd consequence of "if there was arising from another, anything could arise from anything" is presented is that the "other" in "arising from other" is not just something that is different in virtue of being the referent of a different noun, but something that is inherently existent as different. If it existed in that way, then the sprout's depending on the seed would be inconsistent; thus, their relation would be refuted. If [the sprout] were to arise from another unrelated object, then it would arise from anything!) From Nagarjuna's Middle Way: "1. Not from itself, not from another, not from both, nor without cause: Never in any way is there any existing thing that has arisen." According to Mark Siderits and Shōryū Katsura, "This is the overall conclusion for which Nāgārjuna will argue in this chapter: that existents do not come into existence as the result of causes and conditions." Both modern scholars like Mark Siderits and Shōryū Katsura, and classical commentators Lama Tsongkhapa agree on this point. The implied modifying phrase in Nagarjuna's tetralema is "intrinsic" or "inherent" according to Tsongkhapa and Chandrakirti

So, the tetralemma would read: Not from intrinsic self, not from intrinsic other, not from intrinsic both, and not from intrinsic nothingness/causelessness. Notice that each one of these statements is a non-affirming negation which merely negates the subject and does not affirm some other mode of arising in its place. (Note: Question of the N›ga King Anavatapta (Anavatapta-n›gar›ja-parip¸cch›-sÒtra) says: Whatever is produced from conditions is not produced; It is not intrinsically produced. Whatever depends upon conditions, I consider empty; One who knows emptiness is diligent. [Tsongkhapa continues:] After the Buddha has stated in the first line, "Whatever is produced from conditions is not produced," he indicates with the second line the manner of non-production, "It is not intrinsically produced." Thus, adding a qualifying phrase to the object of negation, the Buddha says that things are not produced intrinsically.) These four possibilities include all possible ways that a conventional phenomenon could arise if, in fact, they arose through some type of intrinsic arising process. (Note: "Candrakırti’s Commentary on the "Middle Way" also says: Because things are not produced Causelessly, or from causes such as a divine creator, Or from self, other, or both self and other, They are produced dependently. Dependently produced dependent-arisings are free from the four extreme types of production.) Each one of these modes is negated in sequence - self, other, both, no cause - to arrive at a mere absence: the absence of inherent modes of causality. These arguments are elucidated in great detail Lama Tsongkhapa's commentary on the Mūlamadhyamakakārikā Ocean of Reasoning.

==== Parts-Whole are merely designated ====
Further, one can look to the Seven-Point Analysis of a Chariot by Chandrakirti and find a similar treatment of parts-whole:

"A chariot is neither asserted to be other than its parts, nor to be non-other. It does not possess them. It does not depend on the parts and the parts do not depend on it. It is neither the mere collection of the parts, nor is it their shape. It is like this." ... a chariot is a mere imputation since it does not exist in these seven ways.

It is mind which determines that some collection of parts is now considered to be a whole. Therefore, the relationship of dependent designation is the most pervasive among the three types of dependencies, according to Prāsaṅgika. Therefore, Prāsaṅgika are not stating that nothing exists, but instead hold that phenomena only come into existence co-dependently with minds which are applying conceptual and nominal conventions to mere experiences.

==== Dependent Designation is merely designated ====
Things and phenomenon do exist co-dependently, based upon a relationship with a knowing and designating mind, but nothing exists in an independent, self-arising, or self-sustaining manner. The relationship between object and subject is also empty of inherent existence. From the 1st Panchen Lama's Lozang Chokyi Gyeltsen (Note: Lozang Chokyi Gyeltsen was one of Tsongkhapa's five main disciples.) The Main Road of the Triumphant Ones:

Before the face of proper, total absorption on the actual nature of reality, there is just the severance of fantasized, impossible extremes - namely, inherent, findable existence or total non-existence - with respect to everything of samsara and nirvana. Yet, after you arise, when you inspect, you see that your mind still gives rise to the appearance of things that dependently arise, which do function and can only exist as simply what can be labeled by names. It is unmistakable that such things still naturally dawn, yet they are like dreams, mirages, reflections of the moon in water, and illusions.

To simplify the above, in the direct cognition of rigpa or clear light, (Note: Once one pronounces the words "emptiness" and "absolute", one has the impression of speaking of the same thing, in fact of the absolute. If emptiness must be explained through the use of just one of these two terms, there will be confusion. I must say this; otherwise you might think that the innate original clear light as absolute truth really exists.) there is no findable, inherent subject or object. (Note: Often Dzogchen teachings, Shentong teachings, and the Chittamatra schools claim that this fundamental experience of buddha nature is findable and is established.) When you arise from that meditation, things exist and function, but only as dependent designations. Thus they appear in reality - like a mirage or reflection appears in reality - but cannot be established as existing in-and-of themselves.

=== Emptiness - Ultimate Truth ===
==== Inseparability of Conventional & Ultimate Truth ====
According to the Prasangika, dependent-arising and emptiness are inseparable, and exist in a relationship of entity or identity. A relationship of entity or identity is one in which two objects are merely conceptually distinct, but not actually distinct. For example, the relationship between the mental categorization of a dog and that of an animal, with regards to the same being. If it is a dog, then it must also be an animal. Additionally, this relationship applies to impermanent phenomenon and products: if it's impermanent, it must be a product. Similarly, if it is a conventional arising then it is emptiness, and if it is emptiness, then it is a conventional arising. These two are merely conceptually distinct, but not actually distinct. The two truths are defined only in relationship with one another. In the Heart Sutra, Shariputra and Siddhārtha Gautama illucidate the idea of the emptiness-conventionality inseparability:

"Form is empty. Emptiness is form.
Emptiness is not other than form; form is also not other than emptiness.
In the same way, feeling, discrimination, compositional factors, and consciousness are empty.
Shariputra, likewise, all phenomena are emptiness; without characteristic;
unproduced, unceased; stainless, not without stain; not deficient, not fulfilled."

All phenomena are of the nature of emptiness and emptiness is nowhere to be found except as the nature of all phenomena. Emptiness is established as being synonymous with dependent arising. Dependent arising, also, is established as being synonymous with emptiness. The mere appearance of phenomena due to dependent designation is inseparable from the non-obstruction to their arising, which is emptiness.

==== Emptiness of Emptiness ====
According to both Tsongkhapa and Nagarjuna, emptiness is also empty of inherent existence: emptiness only exists nominally and conventionally. Emptiness is co-dependently arisen as a quality of conventional phenomena and is itself a conventional phenomenon. There is no emptiness just "floating around out there" or a "Great Emptiness from which everything else arises." For example, a table is empty of inherently being a table from its own side. This is referred to as "the emptiness of the table." The emptiness of the table exists conventionally as a property of that particular table. Lama Tsongkhapa quoting Chandrakirti:

Since there is nothing at all that is not empty of intrinsic existence, it is perfectly reasonable to say that even the emptiness which is a seedling's lack of intrinsic nature lacks essential existence. [Which Chandrakirti agrees with when he states] If that which is called emptiness did have some essential existence, then things would have intrinsic nature. However, it does not.

From the Prasaṅgika point of view, it is the same with all types of emptiness. There is no "independent emptiness" or "ultimate emptiness." Therefore, emptiness is an ultimate truth (a fact which applies to all possible phenomena, in all possible worlds), but it is not an ultimate phenomenon or ultimate reality (something which has always existed, is self-created, and is self-sustaining). It is also not a "Tao" or a primal substance from which all other things arise. Buddhapalita comically equates someone who thinks emptiness is inherent with someone who doesn't understand what "nothing" means:

There is no way to overcome the misconceptions of those who think that emptiness is a real thing. For example, if you tell someone, 'I have nothing.' and that person says, 'Give me that nothing.' How could you make that person understand that you have nothing?

Nagarjuna paraphrases the Buddha in the Mulamadhyamikakarika, stating that "the Conqueror said that emptiness eradicates all dogmatic views; as for those who take a dogmatic view of emptiness, he said that they are incurable. Therefore, it is clear that the Prasangika do not advocate an inherent form of emptiness.

==== Karma is carried on the mere 'I' ====
The Prasangika refute the idea of a storehouse consciousness or mind-basis-of-all consciousness. According to Daniel Cozort's interpretation of Ngawang Belden, "the Buddha taught the mind-basis-of-all provisionally, for the benefit of those who could be helped by believing in its existence but who would be harmed by hearing the teachings about emptiness. In his own mind, the basis of his teaching was emptiness. [...] This is because the purpose of positing a mind-basis-of-all is supposed to be to provide a basis for experience without positing external objects." According to the Gelugpa, the Chittamatra hold that the mind-basis-of-all consciousness is that which bears the karmic seeds and is findable upon analysis. That is, "if one sought the basis of the designation of the person one would discover the mind-basis-of-all."

So, how is it that Madhyamika-Prasangika posit that beings accumulate karma and experience their effects without the mind-basis-of-all? They posit that karma is carried on the mere "I" which is dependently designated on the basis of the aggregates, stating that "it is a sufficient basis with which to associate the factors of disintegratedness (karma)." Daniel Cozant expands by saying that since phenomena are neither inherently created nor inherently destroyed according to Prasangika, that "therefore, the possibility of a later effect is not precluded."

== Eight unique tenets & thirteen distinguishing features ==
According to Daniel Cozort's Unique Tenets of the Middle Way Consequence School (based on the work of Jamyang Shayba and Ngawang Belden) there are eight unique tenets within the Madhyamika-Prasangika viewpoint:

- The Unique Way of Refuting a Mind-Basis-of-All
- The Unique Way of Refuting Self-Consciousness
- The Non-Assertion of Autonomous Reasons (svatantra)
- The Unique Way of Asserting External Objects
- The Proof That Hearers and Solitary Realizers Realize the Selflessness of Phenomena
- The Unique Way of Positing the Conception of a Self of Phenomena as an Affliction
- The Unique Way of Asserting That Disintegratedness Is a Functioning Thing
- The Unique Presentation of the Three Times

He also cites thirteen distinguishing features of the Prasangika view:

- Valid Cognition Is Mistaken but Reliable
- Refutation of Autonomous Syllogisms
- Prasangika Perspective on the Destruction of the Obstructions to Omniscience
- Pramana Is Not Necessarily New Cognition
- Mental Direct Perception Can be Conceptual
- Prasangika Perspectives on Nirvana
- The Two Selflessnesses of Persons and Phenomena Are Equally Subtle
- Desire and Aversion Conceive True Existence
- Common Beings Can Have Yogic Direct Perception
- One Can Directly Realize the Sixteen Aspects of the Four Noble Truths Even before the Path of Preparation
- True Cessations Are the Dharmadhatu
- Pratyaksa Refers to Objects
- How Prasangikas Avoid the Two Extremes.

== Criticism ==
Some of the greatest subsequent Tibetan scholars have become famous for their own works either defending or attacking Tsongkhapa's views. (Note: As Thakchö says, Rongton Shakya Gyaltsen, Taktsang Lotsawa, Gorampa, Shakya Chogden, The eighth Karmapa Mikyo Dorje, Mipham Rinpoche, Gendün Chöphel and others have raised serious and fierce objections against Tsongkhapa's views of Madhyamaka, whereas Gyaltsab Je, Khedrub Je, Gendun Drub, Sera Jetsun Chokyi Gyaltsen, Panchen Sonam Dragpa, Panchen Lobsang Chokyi Gyaltsen, The first Jamyang Zhépa, Changkya Rolpai Dorje, Konchog Jigme Wangpo and others have vehemently defended his interpretation.)

=== Svātantrika in disguise ===
According to the Padmakara Translation Group:

The Gelugpa interpretation of Prāsangika has often been described by its critics as a form of Svātantrika in disguise, since its presentation of "conventional," as distinct from "true," existence seems very close to the "existence according to characteristics" that Bhavya had ascribed to phenomena on the relative level.

According to the Nyingma lineage, Ju Mipham was one of the critics who argued that Je Tsongkhapa was also a Svatantrika, because of the way he refutes true establishment instead of objects themselves. According to Ju Mipham, Je Tsongkhapa's approach is an excellent Svatantrika approach, that leads students in the right direction but will not lead to the true ultimate until they go further.

=== Own inventions ===
Tsongkhapa's rejection of Svatantrika has been criticised within the Tibetan tradition, qualifying it as Tsongkhapa's own invention, "novelties that are not found in any Indian sources," and therefore "a major flaw" and "unwarranted and unprecedented within the greater Madhyamaka tradition." (Note: According to Brunnhölzl, writing from a Karma Kagyü (Mahamudra) point of view on Madhyamaka, "All critics of Tsongkhapa, including the Eighth Karmapa, agree that many features of his Centrism are novelties that are not found in any Indian sources and see this as a major flaw." Yet, Brunnhölzl also notes that "the point here is whether what is said accords with and serves to accomplish the Buddha’s fundamental concern of liberation from cyclic existence and attaining Buddhood.")

According to Thupten Jinpa, the Gelugpa school sees Tsongkhapa's ideas as mystical revelations from the bodhisattva Manjusri, (Note: Thupten: "The traditional Geluk understanding of these deviations in Tsongkhapa's thought attributes the development of his distinct reading of Madhyamaka philosophy to a mystical communion he is reported to have had with the bodhisattva Manjusri [...] It is interesting that the tradition Tsongkhapa is claiming to honour is, in a strict sense, not the existing system in Tibet; rather, it appears to be in the tradition of Manjusri as revealed in a mystic vision!) whereas Gorampa accused him of being inspired by a demon. (Note: Sonam Thakchoe or José Cabezón: "Gorampa, in the Lta ba ngan sel (Eliminating the Erroneous View), accuses Tsongkhapa of being "seized by demons" (bdud kyis zin pa) and in the Lta ba'i shan 'byed (Distinguishing Views) decries him as a "nihilistic Madhyamika" (dbu ma chad lta ba) who is spreading "demonic words" (bdud kyi tshig).") Brunnhölzl further notes that, according to his Karma Kagyü (Mahamudra) critics, Tsongkhapa was mistaken in some regards in his understanding of emptiness, taking it as a real existent, and thereby hindering the liberation of his followers. (Note: According to Karmapa Mikyö Dorje, as described by Brunnhölzl, there are "two main types of misunderstanding emptiness: 1) misconceiving emptiness as utter nonexistence 2) misconceiving emptiness as a real entity" Emptiness can be misconstrued as a real entity in two ways: "Tsongkhapa and his followers claim that emptiness is an existent and thus the actual nature of entities, which are its supports. Most other Tibetans in this category, such as Dölpopa and Sakya Chogden, say that only emptiness (which is really established) exists, whereas, ultimately, all other phenomena of the seeming level do not exist. Both of these views are mistaken with regard to the path to liberation.) According to Van Schaik, these criticisms furthered the establishment of the Gelupga as an independent school:

As Khedrup and later followers of Tsongkhapa hit back at accusations like these, they defined their own philosophical tradition, and this went a long way to drawing a line in the sand between the Gandenpas and the broader Sakya tradition.

=== Hornlike object of negation ===
Karl Brunnholzl notes that Tsongkhapa's "object of negation," the "phantom notion of 'real existence' different from the 'table that is established through valid cognition'," is called a "hornlike object of negation" by his critics: Tsongkhapa first puts a horn on the head of the rabbit, and then removes it again, a maneuver which "affects neither the rabbit's existence nor your taking the rabbit for a rabbit." According to Brunnholzl,

This is precisely why it is said that such an approach to the object of negation is not suitable for relinquishing the reifying clinging to persons and phenomena and thus does not lead to liberation from cyclic existence. Through negating the hornlike object of negation called “real existence” with regard to a table, we will neither relinquish the clinging to the reality of this table nor realize its ultimate nature. (Note: The subtle difference between "conventional existence" and "true existence," and the dangers it entails when not understanding it, has also been noted and accepted by later critics of Tsongkhapa, such as Mipham Rinpoche. Padmakara Translation Group: "Mipham Rinpoche attacked it tirelessly as a pernicious distortion that actively hinders the experience of the absence of conceptual construction, which alone is the hallmark of the true realization of emptiness. It is clear, however, that Mipham’s attack was not directed at Tsongkhapa personally, about whom he invariably speaks in respectful terms. His critique, like that of Gendun Chöpel in his Ornament of Nagarjuna’s Meaning, is directed at a possible misrepresentation of Tsongkhapa’s meaning, resulting in what Jeffrey Hopkins refers to as a "pedagogical fault." The assertion that 'the pot is not empty of pot but of true existence' — by someone for whom the distinction between the object of negation and the basis of negation means nothing on the experiential or even intellectual level — far from calling into question the apparent reality of phenomena, tends instead to confirm the deep-rooted habitual belief in substantial reality. In the last analysis, it is a species of realism. It involves a separation of the two truths and is in practice indistinguishable from Bhavaviveka’s Svatantrika assertion that phenomena, though empty ultimately, exist according to their characteristics on the conventional level.")

=== Levels of realization ===
As a result of Je Tsongkhapa's view, the Gelugpa lineage establishes a sort of ladder of progressively refined worldviews and identify the Svatantrika view as inferior to the Prasangika. Sakya and Kagyu scholars argued against the claim that students using Svatantrika do not achieve the same realization as those using the Prasangika approach; According to those critics, there is no difference in the realization of those using the Svatantrika and Prasangika approaches. They also argue that the Svatantrika approach is better for students who are not able to understand the more direct approach of Prasangika, but it nonetheless results in the same ultimate realization.

== See also ==
- Buddha-nature
- Buddhapālita
- Consciousness-only
- Nagarjuna
  - Mūlamadhyamakakārikā
- Schools of Buddhism
  - Madhyamaka
  - Prasangika
  - Sautrantika
  - Yogacara
- Two Truths Doctrine

== Notes ==
Subnotes

== Sources ==
Primary

- Geshe Kelsang Gyatso (1995), Ocean of Nectar, Tharpa Publications, ISBN 978-0-948006-23-4
- Shantarakshita; Ju Mipham (2005), The Adornment of the Middle Way, Padmakara Translation, ISBN 1-59030-241-9
- Tsong Khapa (2002), The great treatise on the stages of the path to enlightenment: Volume 3, Snow Lion Publications, ISBN 1-55939-166-9
- Tsonghkhapa (2006), Ocean of Reasoning, Oxford University Press, ISBN 978-0-19-514732-2

Secondary

- Brunhölzl, Karl (2004), Center of the Sunlit Sky: Madhyamaka in the Kagyu Tradition, Snow Lion Publications
- Cheng, Hsueh-Li (1981), "The Roots of Zen Buddhism", Journal of Chinese Philosophy, 8 (4): 451–478, doi:10.1111/j.1540-6253.1981.tb00267.x
- Dreyfus, Georges B.J.; McClintock, L. Sara (2015), "Introduction", in Dreyfus, Georges B.J.; McClintock, L. Sara (eds.), Svatantrika-Prasangika Distinction: What Difference Does a Difference Make?, Simon and Schuster
- Rizzi, Cesare (1988), Candrakīrti, Motilal Banarsidass
