= Jamyang Zhepa =

Tibetan Buddhist teacher

Tibetan name
- Tibetan: འཇམ་དབྱངས་བཞད་པ་
Transcriptions
- Wylie: 'jam dbyangs bzhad pa
- Tibetan Pinyin: Jamyang Xaiba
- Lhasa IPA: [dʑàmjaŋ ɕɛ̀pa]

Chinese name
- Simplified Chinese: 嘉木样协巴
Transcriptions
Standard Mandarin
- Hanyu Pinyin: Jiāmùyàng Xiébā

The Jamyang Zhepas (Tibetan: འཇམ་དབྱངས་བཞད་པ་, Wylie: 'jam dbyangs bzhad pa) are a lineage of tulkus of the Gelug school of Tibetan Buddhism. They have traditionally been the most prestigious teachers at Labrang Monastery in Amdo, Tibet (modern Gansu, China).

== 1st Jamyang Zhepa ==
The first Jamyang Zhepa, Ngawang Tsöndrü (1648–1721), was a native of Amdo and, after studying at Drepung Monastery near Lhasa, was invited by the local Mongol king to return and teach Buddhism there. There, Ngawang Tsöndrü later founded Labrang, one of the two great monasteries of Amdo. As the first Jamyang Zhepa was educated at Drepung, the lineage has subsequently belonged the Gelug.

Ngawang Tsöndrü was a great scholar. He wrote Roar of the Five-Faced [Lion], a series of verses on tenets, along with a massive commentary to the root text (around 530 folios), called Great Exposition on Tenets. According to Daniel Cozort, Jamyang's works "are the most comprehensive of the tenets texts" (in Tibetan Buddhism). He also wrote various textbooks which are used today in numerous Gelug colleges.

According to Tibetan legends, Jamyang Zhepa harbored strong animosity towards the Nyingma tradition and its scholars, such as Lochen Dharmashri of Minling Monastery, because of their influence on the 5th Dalai Lama, the 6th Dalai Lama, and the 5th Dalai Lama's Regent. The 5th Dalai Lama showed more respect to Minling Lochen than Jamyang Zhepa, which fueled his resentment and desire for revenge. During one instance, while in his homeland of Amdo, Jamyang Zhepa conspired with the Mongol Dzungar, leading Dzungar troops to attack Mindroling and Dorje Drak monasteries. Upon reaching Nagqu (Nagchu), he pretended no involvement in the atrocities and continued to Tashi Lhunpo in Tsang. Meanwhile, Dzungar troops proceeded to Lhokkha, destroying two more monasteries and executing Minling Lochen, Dodrak Rinzin Pema Trinly, and eight hundred monks. This legend of the massacre is believed to be true and linked to Jamyang Zhepa. His close follower Ngawang Tashi documented his intense hatred and resentment towards Minling Lochen in his biography titled "namthar tsenpoma" or "rje btsun dam pa mtshan brjod par dka' ba 'jam dbyang bzhed pa'i rdo rje'i rnam par thar pa yongs su brjod pa'i gtam du bya ba dad pa'i sgo 'byed kai ta ka" (The Biography of the Lordly and Precious Guru, Jamyang Zhepa: A Record of His Life and Accomplishments with a Compendium of Instructions on the Conduct of the Spiritually Accomplished Ones).

== 2nd Jamyang Zhepa ==
Gönchok Jikmé Ongpo (1728–1791), is also known for his shorter tenets text called Precious Garland of Tenets as well as other works on the bodhisattva path, the Presentation of the Grounds and Paths, Beautiful Ornament of the Three Vehicles.

== 6th Jamyang Zhepa ==
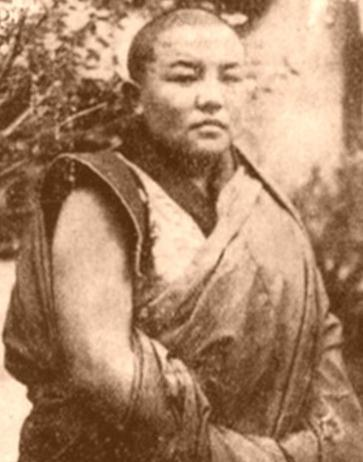
Lozang Jamyang Yéshé Tenpé Gyeltsen, 5th Jamyang Zhepa

The current Jamyang Zhepa is the 6th, Lobsang Jigme Thubten Chökyi Nyima (born 1948). During the Cultural Revolution, he became a layman and married with Muslim woman. Tibetan Buddhist teachers may be either laypersons or monks, but the Jamyang Zhepas used to be traditionally monks. He lives in Lanzhou, the capital of Gansu.
