= John Powers (academic) =

Cultural historian and academic

C. John Powers FAHA (born 1 October 1957) is an American-born Australian scholar of Asian Studies and Buddhism, with particular expertise in Tibetan Buddhism. Much of his teaching career has been at the Australian National University in Canberra. As of 2025 he is at the University of Melbourne.

== Early life and education ==
Powers was born on 1 October 1957. He graduated from the College of the Holy Cross in Worcester, Massachusetts, with a Bachelor of Arts, cum laude, in philosophy and religious studies in 1979. He then earned a Master of Arts in Indian philosophy from McMaster University in 1984. His master's thesis was titled, The Concept of the Middle Way (madhyama-pratipad) in the Madhyamaka and Yogācāra Schools.

In 1991, Powers earned his Ph.D. in Buddhist studies from the University of Virginia. His doctoral dissertation was titled, "The Ultimate (don dam pa, paramārtha) in the Sūtra Explaining the Thought (Saṃdhinirmocana-sūtra): Study, Translation, and Notes". The thesis was a translation of Sandhinirmocana Sutra from the Tibetan, and in 1995 was published in hardback and paperback by Dharma Publishing in 1995, titled Wisdom of Buddha: The Samdhinirmochana Sutra.

== Career ==
In 1987 Powers was appointed adjunct professor in the Department of Philosophy and Religion at Virginia Commonwealth University, Richmond, Virginia. From summer 1989 until the northern summer of 1995, he spent periods of varying lengths as research assistant, lecturer, visiting professor at various universities in the United States. He was briefly Kiriyama Chair of Pacific Rim Studies at the University of San Francisco in 1995.

Powers was appointed senior lecturer at the Australian National University in late 1995. He was deputy dean of the Faculty of Asian Studies from 2000 to 2001, spending four months of these as acting dean. He was made professor in 2008. Powers, like several others, left the university after a controversial restructuring of the department.

In 2022, Powers was appointed to the University of Melbourne as lecturer in Buddhism Studies. This was a joint appointment, with the Contemplative Studies Centre and the School of Historical and Philosophical Studies in the Faculty of Arts. The role involves teaching, research, and outreach.

== Writing and research interests ==
A practising Buddhist, he has special expertise in Buddhism in Tibet. As well as publishing work on Buddhist spirituality and meditation techniques, he has written extensive translations of Tibetan works, and written on the history and culture of Tibet, India, and China. He is both personally and professionally interested in Buddhist philosophy and practice, climate change, and human rights.

Powers, who supports Tibetan autonomy, has compared the Chinese treatment of the Tibetan people to the fate of the Aboriginal Australians during the colonisation of Australia.

== Other activities ==
Powers has sat on a large number of committees, often as chair. In May 2001, he was coordinator of the "Mind and Science" forum held at ANU, which included the Dalai Lama, Paul Davies, Frank Cameron Jackson, Allan Snyder, Maxwell Bennett, Jack Pettigrew, Robyn Williams.

== Recognition ==
Powers has been the recipient of a large number of grants and fellowships during his career. He has often been called upon for media interviews, most of them about Tibet as a region (Tibet Autonomous Region) under Chinese rule.

Powers was invited by the Dalai Lama's Australian office, which regarded him as the leading expert in the country, to Tenzin Gyatsho's 70th birthday celebration in 2005.

In 2013 Powers was elected a Fellow of the Australian Academy of the Humanities.

== Personal life ==
Powers' personal interests include photography, reading, and watching ice hockey.

== Publications ==
=== As author ===
- The Yogācāra school of Buddhism: A Bibliography. American Theological Library Association. 1991. ISBN 978-0-8108-2502-4.
- Hermeneutics and Tradition in the Saṃdhinirmocana-sūtra. Indian Thought and Culture. Vol. 5. E. J. Brill. 1993. ISBN 978-90-04-09826-8.
- Introduction to Tibetan Buddhism. Snow Lion Publications. 1995. ISBN 978-1-55939-028-6.
- Religion und Kultur Tibets: Das geistige Erbe eines buddhistischen Landes (in German). O. W. Barth. 1998. ISBN 978-3-502-65487-2.
- A Concise Encyclopedia of Buddhism. Concise Encyclopedia of World Faiths. Oneworld Publications. 2000. ISBN 978-1-85168-233-1.
- History as Propaganda: Tibetan Exiles Versus the People's Republic of China. Oxford University Press. 2004. ISBN 978-0-19-517426-7.
- A Concise Introduction to Tibetan Buddhism. Shambhala. 2008. ISBN 978-1-55939-296-9.
- A Bull of a Man: Images of Masculinity, Sex, and the Body in Indian Buddhism. Harvard University Press. 2009. ISBN 978-0-674-03329-0.

=== As co-editor ===
- Scriptures of world religions. McGraw Hill, 1998 (with James Fieser)

=== As translator ===
- Wisdom of Buddha: the Saṁdhinirmocana Sūtra. Tibetan translation series, Vol. 16, (Translator), Dharma Publications, 1995
- Jñānagarbha's Commentary on just the Maitreya chapter from the Saṃdhinirmocana-Sūtra: study, translation and Tibetan text. Indian Council of Philosophical Research, 1998
