= Prajñaptir upādāya =

Dependent designation (from Sanskrit: prajñaptir upādāya; Tibetan: བརྟེན་ནས་གདགས་པ, Wylie: rten ne dag pa; Chinese: 假名; pinyin: jia-ming) is a doctrine of Madhyamika Buddhism.

The term was coined (or appeared to be coined) by Nagarjuna in 24:18 of the Mūlamadhyamakakārikā. It became important for, and was championed by, the Tibetan followers of Candrakirti.

Whatever is dependently co-arisen

That is explained to be emptiness.
That, being a dependent designation,

Is itself the middle way.

— Nagarjuna, Mūlamadhyamakakārikā 24:18

Dependent designation is one of the 'three dependencies' asserted by the Madhyamikas, the others being dependent arising, which relates to the concept that all existents arise from causes; and dependence upon parts, the idea that all existents are composite. Each of these dependencies are used, separately and together, to help establish an understanding of sunyata, the absence of inherent existence, which is connected to anatta (no-self), the third of the three marks of existence.

According to the 14th Dalai Lama,

Phenomena are merely imputed by terms and conceptuality in dependence upon their basis of imputation.
