= Guy Newland =

American academic

Guy Martin Newland (born 1955) is a scholar of Tibetan Buddhism who was a professor at Central Michigan University in Mount Pleasant, Michigan from 1988 until his retirement in 2025. He served as Chairperson of Central Michigan University's Department of Philosophy and Religion during the periods 2000–2003, 2006–2009, and 2016-2019. He was elected to the Mount Pleasant Board of Education in July 2003 and served until December 2007, including six months as President of the Board and one year as Secretary.

Newland received his PhD from the University of Virginia, where he was a student of Jeffrey Hopkins.

== Publications ==
In 2016, Newland published a personal memoir: A Buddhist Grief Observed (Wisdom Publications, 2016).

Newland has authored, translated, and edited a number of publications on Tibetan Buddhism, including:

- Start Making Sense: Finding Tsongkhapa's Middle Way in Tsongkhapa: The Legacy of Tibet's Great Philosopher-Saint edited by David Gray. New York: Wisdom Publications, 2024.
- Moonpaths: Ethics and Emptiness by the Cowherds (a scholarly collective producing work collaboratively, including Guy Newland, Jay Garfield, Tom Tillemans, Jan Westerhoff, and several others). New York: Oxford University Press, 2015.
- How Does Merely Conventional Karma Work? in Moonpaths. New York: Oxford University Press, 2015.
- The Non-speaking God: How do I know what God wants from me? A short essay on Aronofsky's film Noah on a peer-reviewed website, 2014.
- From Here to Enlightenment by the Dalai Lama, translated, annotated, and introduced by Guy Newland. Boston: Shambala Publications: 2012.
- Emptiness (śūnyatā) in Oxford Bibliographies. New York: Oxford University Press, 2011.
- Moonshadows: Conventional Truth in Buddhist Philosophy edited by the Cowherds (a scholarly collective producing work collaboratively, including Guy Newland, Jay Garfield, Tom Tillemans, Jan Westerhoff, and several others). New York: Oxford University Press: 2011.
- An Introduction to Conventional Truth by Guy Newland and Tom Tillemans in Moonshadows. New York: Oxford University Press, 2011.
- Weighing the Butter, Levels of Explanation, and Falsification: Models of the Conventional in Tsongkhapa’s Account of the Conventional in Moonshadows. New York: Oxford University Press, 2011.
- Introduction to Emptiness: As Taught in Tsong-kha-pa's Great Treatise on the Stages of the Path. Snow Lion: 2008.
- The Great Treatise on the Stages of the Path to Enlightenment, Volume 2, by Tsong-kha-pa. Translated by the Lamrim Chenmo Translation Committee; Joshua W.C. Cutler, Editor-in-Chief, Guy Newland, Editor. Ithaca, NY: Snow Lion, 2004.
- The Great Treatise on the Stages of the Path to Enlightenment, Volume 3, by Tsong-kha-pa. Translated by the Lamrim Chenmo Translation Committee; Joshua W.C. Cutler, Editor-in-Chief, Guy Newland, Editor. Ithaca, NY: Snow Lion, 2002.
- Changing Minds: Contributions to the Study of Buddhism and Tibet in Honor of Jeffrey Hopkins. Edited by Guy Newland. Ithaca, NY: Snow Lion, 2001.
- Ask a Farmer: Ultimate Analysis and Conventional Existence in Tsong kha pa's Lam rim chen mo in Changing Minds: Contributions to the Study of Buddhism and Tibet in Honor of Jeffrey Hopkins. Edited by Guy Newland. Ithaca, NY: Snow Lion, 2001.
- The Great Treatise on the Stages of the Path to Enlightenment, Volume 1, by Tsong-kha-pa. Translated by the Lamrim Chenmo Translation Committee; Joshua W.C. Cutler, Editor-in-Chief, Guy Newland, Editor. Ithaca, NY: Snow Lion, 2000.
- Appearance and Reality: The Two Truths in Four Buddhist Systems by Guy Newland. Ithaca, NY: Snow Lion Publications, 1999.
- The Debate Manual (yig cha) in Tibetan Monastic Education by Guy Newland. In Tibetan Literature: Studies in Genre edited by José Cabezón and Roger Jackson. Ithaca, NY: Snow Lion Publications, 1996.
- The Two Truths. Guy Newland. Ithaca, NY: Snow Lion Publications, 1992.
- Compassion: A Tibetan Analysis. London: Wisdom Publications, 1984.

== Citations to Newland's works ==
- Newland's work on The Great Treatise was listed as a "Selected Reading" in How to Be Compassionate: A Handbook for Creating Inner Peace and a Happier World by the Dalai Lama.
- The Two Truths is cited twice in A Study of the Dharmadharmatavibhanga: The root text and its scriptural source (the Avikalpapravesadharani) by Raymond E. Robertson et al.
- Three of Newland's works are listed in the "Further Reading" section of Insight Into Emptiness by Khensur Jampa Tegchok.

== See also ==
- Lamrim
