= Taktsang Lotsawa Sherab Rinchen =

Tibetan translator and scholar (1505–1477)

Taktsang Lotsawa Sherab Rinchen (Tibetan: སྟག་ཚང་ལོ་ཙཱ་བ་ཤེས་རབ་རིན་ཆེན།།, Wylie: stag tshang lo tsA ba dra pa shes rab rin chen; 1405–1477) was a 15th-century translator and scholar of the Sakya school of Tibetan Buddhism. He was an important translator and commentator of tantric literature, and is regarded as one of the Great Translators (Lotsawas). His collected works were recently published in the Tibetan book series mes po'i shul bzhag (Chinese: Xianzhe yishu 先哲遗书) in 7 volumes. He authored an annotated treatise on the various Buddhist traditions, the Grub mtha' kun gsal gyi rtsa grel, which presents a detailed discussion of the Buddhist schools of ancient India. The work places particular emphasis on the doctrine and teachings of the Madhyamaka tradition founded by Nāgārjuna.

== See also ==
- Paltsek Research Institute

== Works ==
- Grub mtha’ kun gsal gyi rtsa grel. Nationalities Press, Beijing 1999. 230 pp. ISBN 7-105-03394-0. Edited by Tshülthrim Gyeltshen (tshul khrims rgyal mtshan).
- sTag tshang lo tsā ba shes rab rin chen gyi gsung ’bum. 7 vols. Krung go’i bod rig pa dpe skrun khang, 2007. ISBN 978-7-80057-898-4 (mes po'i shul bzhag, vols. 29–35)
