= Changkya Rölpé Dorjé =

Tibetan Buddhist teacher (1717–1786)

- ལྕང་སྐྱ་རོལ་པའི་རྡོ་རྗེ།
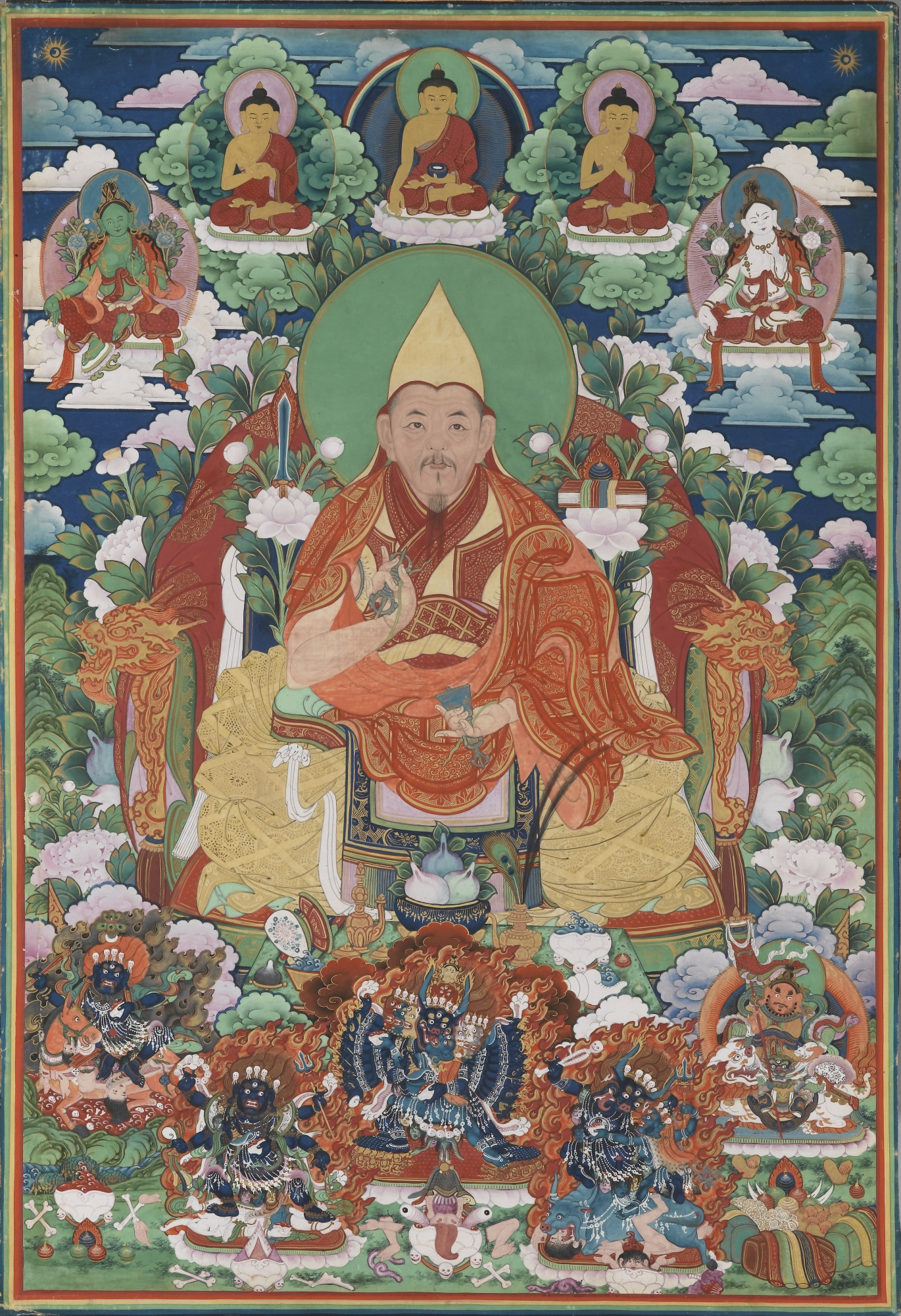

Personal life
- Born: 1717 Wuwei, Gansu, China
- Died: 1786 (aged 68–69)

Religious life
- Religion: Tibetan Buddhism
- School: Gelug
- Lineage: Changkya Khutukhtu

Senior posting
- Predecessor: Changkya Ngawang Losang Chöden
- Successor: Changkya Yéshé Tenpé Gyeltsen
- Reincarnation: Changkya Ngawang Losang Chöden

Changkya Rölpé Dorjé (Tibetan: ལྕང་སྐྱ་རོལ་པའི་རྡོ་རྗེ།, Wylie: lcang skya rol pa'i rdo rje; Mongolian: Ролбийдорж; 1717–1786) was a Tibetan Buddhist teacher in the Qing court, a close associate of the Qianlong Emperor, and an important intermediary between the imperial court and Inner Asia. He also oversaw the translation of the Tibetan Buddhist canon into Classical Mongolian and Manchu. He also was involved in the compilation of a quadrilingual set (Chinese, Manchurian, Mongolian, and Tibetan) and supervised the translation from Chinese into Manchurian, Mongolian and Tibetan of the entire Śūraṅgama Sūtra completed in 1763; the Tibetan translation is currently preserved in a supplement to the Narthang Kangyur.

== Biography ==
=== Sources ===
The main sources on the life of Changkya Rölpé Dorjé come from two biographies which were written by his contemporaries, one by his brother and one by his disciple. The scholar Hans-Rainer Kämpfe produced a study on the first source in 1976.

=== Birth and early education ===
Changkya Rölpé Dorjé was born on the 10th day of the fourth (Hor) month of the Fire-Bird year (1717) in Wuwei (formerly known as Liangzhou) near Lanzhou in Gansu to an ethnically Monguor family. At an early age he was recognized by the first Jamyang Zhépa as the incarnation of the previous Changkya Kutuktu of Gönlung Jampa Ling monastery (佑寧寺) in Amdo (now Qinghai), one of the four great Gelug monasteries of the north. At his investiture the Kangxi Emperor sent Kachen Shérap Dargyé as his representative.

In 1723, soon after the death of the Kangxi Emperor, the new Yongzheng Emperor (r. 1722–1735) was just establishing his authority, Mongol tribesmen claiming the succession of Güshi Khan, together with their Amdo Tibetan allies and supported by some factions within the monasteries, rose up against the Qing in the region of Kokonor. The Yongzheng Emperor insisted on violent reprisals and in Amdo the Manchu army, destroyed villages and monasteries believed to have sided with the rebels including in 1724 Gönlung. However the emperor ordered that the seven-year-old Changkya incarnation not be harmed but brought to China as a "guest". At the Yongzheng Emperor's court, he was raised and educated to serve as an intermediary between the seat of Manchu power and the Buddhists of Amdo, Tibet and Mongolia. Rölpé Dorjé's monastic teachers included Zhangshu Kachen Shérap Dargyé; the second Thuken Hotogtu, Ngakwang Chökyi Gyatso and Atsé Chöjé Lozang Chödzin.

Changkya Rölpé Dorjé and his teachers realised that in order for the Gelug teachings to flourish in China and Manchuria they would need to be available in Chinese, Mongolian and Manchu and so he began the study of those languages. One of his fellow students was Prince Hungli, who became his friend — and eventually the Qianlong Emperor (r. 1735–1796).

He also took an interest in Chinese Buddhism and thought that their principle philosophical views had close similarities with those of the Yogachara (Tibetan: སེམས་ཙམ་པ) school. He was also apparently the one who came up with the notion that Dampa Sangye, the Indian founder of the Pacification (Tibetan: ཞི་བྱེད།, Wylie: zhi byed, THL: Zhijé) school in Tibet who supposedly also visited China, and Bodhidharma were the same person.

=== Exile of the 7th Dalai Lama ===
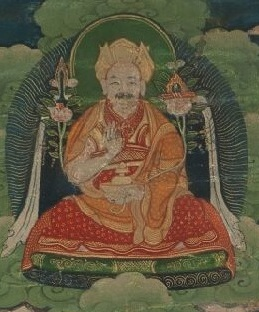
The Third Changkya, Rolpe Dorje

In the late 1720s Polhané Sönam Topgyé mounted a successful campaign to take control of Tibet and the Seventh Dalai Lama was exiled, leaving Lhasa at the end of 1728. The Manchu ambans in Lhasa, representatives of the Yongzheng emperor, arranged for an invitation to the Paṇchen Lama Lozang Yéshé to travel to Lhasa, which he reluctantly did, in October 1728. Polhané granted him dominion over most of Tsang and Ngari, forcing him to cede the eastern part of the region to Lhasa.

In 1729 after the Panchen Lama sent a letter and numerous gifts to the Yongzheng Emperor, Rölpé Dorjé obtained permission from the emperor for his monastery Gönlung Jampa Ling to be rebuilt.

=== First visit to Tibet ===
In 1732 the Panchen Lama petitioned the Emperor to enable the Seventh Dalai Lama to return to Lhasa. When the petition was granted in 1734 Rölpé Dorjé was ordered by Yongzheng to accompany the 7th Dalai Lama to Lhasa. This trip gave Rölpé Dorjé the opportunity to study with the Dalai Lama as well as to make offerings at Lhasa's major monasteries and to present gifts from the emperor. In 1735 Changkya and the Dalai Lama went on to Tashi Lhunpo Monastery in Shigatse to pay his respect to Lobsang Yeshe, 5th Panchen Lama (1663-1737), where he took both his initial and final monastic vows under the Panchen Lama's supervision.

When the Yongzheng Emperor died in 1736, Rölpé Dorjé had to give up his plans to study under the Panchen Lama and returned to Beijing. Both the Panchen Lama and Dalai Lama offered him religious statues and other significant gifts as parting presents.

=== Lama of the Qianlong Emperor ===
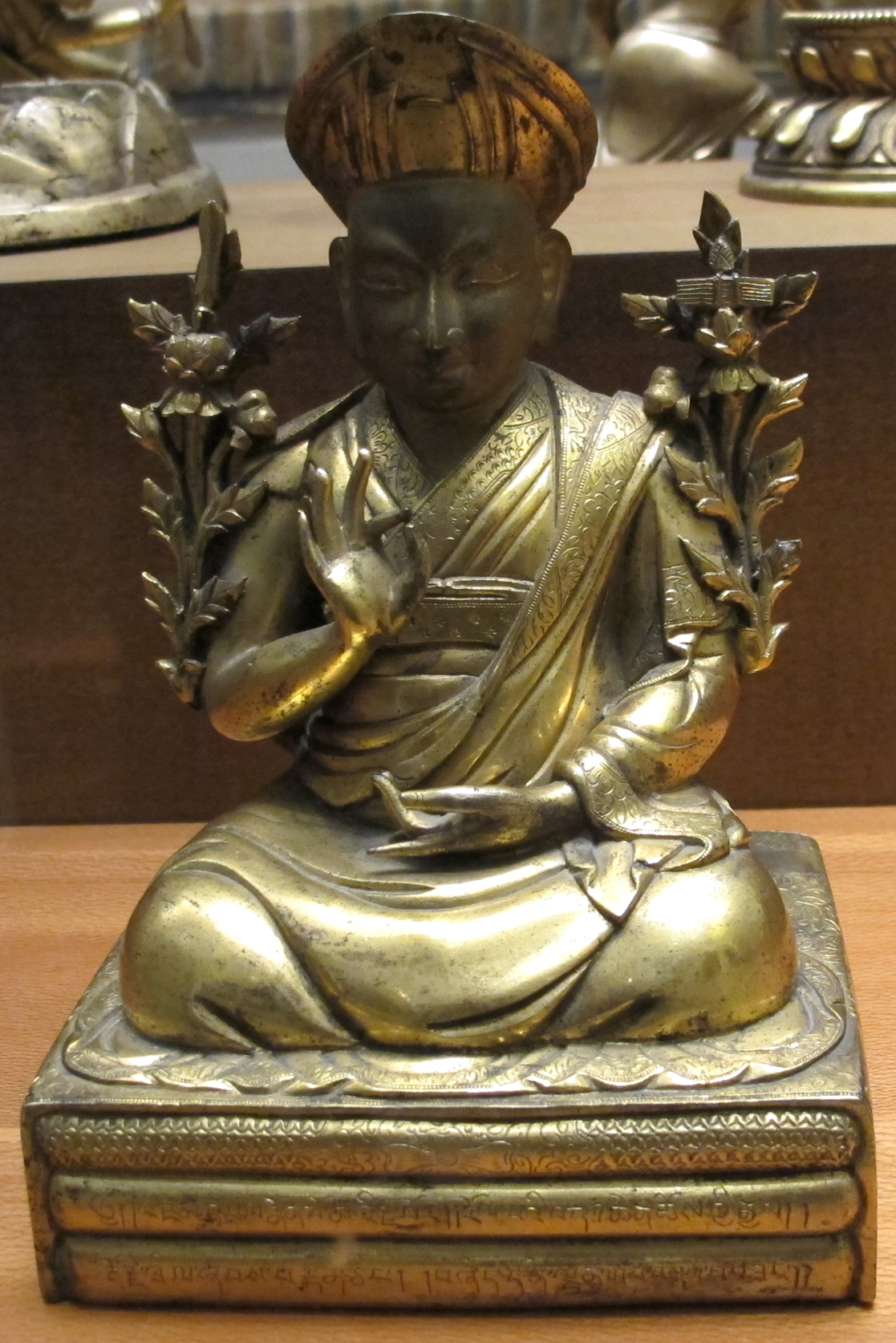
18th-century statue of Rolpe Dorje

In 1744, the Qianlong Emperor decided to transform the Yonghegong Palace in Beijing into a Gelugpa monastery as well as an Imperial Palace. This became the residence of Changkya and many other important incarnations from Amdo and Mongolia and the centre for the Qing to manage Tibetan Buddhist affairs and control local authorities in Mongolia, Amdo, Tibet and other areas which followed Tibetan Buddhism.

In 1744, Qianlong also indicated to Rölpé Dorjé that he wanted to receive private religious teachings and Rölpé Dorjé first taught him the commentary on how to take refuge in the three jewels as well instructing him in Tibetan grammar and reading. Later, Qianlong requested teachings on the Bodhisattva path and Rölpé Dorjé taught him the commentary of the Graduated Path (Lam Rim) by Vajradhara Kunchok Gyaltsen, together with a commentary by the previous Changkya, Ngawang Losang Chöden. "By studying these two texts, Qianlong developed great faith (gong ma thugs dad gting nas khrungs) and made a commitment to practice daily, which he kept despite his busy schedule"

In 1745, after Rölpé Dorjé completed a retreat, the Qianlong Emperor asked him for the tantric teachings and empowerment (abhisheka) of his yidam, Chakrasamvara. As the disciple and requester of the abhisheka, the emperor had to gather all the necessary materials and equipment. Rölpé Dorjé conferred on the emperor abhisheka the five deities Chakrasamvara according to the lineage of the Indian siddha, Ghantapa. During the initiation, Rölpé Dorjé as vajra master sat on the throne and the emperor knelt to receive the initiation according to the prescriptions for disciples. The emperor offered 100 ounces of gold with a mandala (symbolizing the universe) to receive the initiation. After the initiation, Qianlong said to Rölpé Dorjé, "Now you are not only my lama, you are my vajra master."

In 1748, Rölpé Dorjé made his first trip back to Gönlung Jampa Ling, his monastery that he had left as a child, and at his request the monastery was granted an Imperial Plaque which was installed above the entrance to the main assembly hall.

=== Timeline ===
In 1757, went to Tibet

In 1760, returned to China

In 1763, his father died

In 1792, Qianlong, who had been the generous patron, friend and dedicated student of Rölpé Dorjé, sought to assure his Chinese subjects that foreign priests exercised no influence over him. His Pronouncements on Lamas (Lama Shuo) preserved in a tetraglot (Chinese, Manchu, Mongol, and Tibetan) inscription at the Yonghe Temple in Beijing, Qianlong defends his patronage of the "Yellow Hat" (Gelug) sect from his Chinese critics by claiming that his support had simply been expedient: "By patronizing the Yellow Sect we maintain peace among the Mongols. This being an important task we cannot but protect this (religion). (In doing so) we do not show any bias, nor do we wish to adulate the Tibetan priests as (was done during the) Yuan dynasty."

== Teachers ==
- Purchok Ngakwang Jampa (ཕུར་ལྕོག་ངག་དབང་བྱམས་པ་) (1682—1762)
- Atsé Chöjé Lozang Chödzin (ཨ་རྩེ་ཆོས་རྗེ་བློ་བཟང་ཆོས་འཛིན་)
- Thuken 02 Ngakwang Chökyi Gyatso (ཐུའུ་བཀྭན་ངག་དབང་ཆོས་ཀྱི་རྒྱ་མཚོ་) (1680—1736)
- Chepa Tulku 02 Lozang Trinlé (ཆས་པ་སྤྲུལ་སྐུ་བློ་བཟང་འཕྲིན་ལས་)
- Dalai Lama 07 Kelzang Gyatso (ཏཱ་ལའི་བླ་མ་བསྐལ་བཟང་རྒྱ་མཚོ་) (1708—1757)
- Paṇchen 05 Lozang Yéshé (པཎ་ཆེན་བློ་བཟང་ཡེ་ཤེས་) (1663—1737)

== Students ==
- Tukwan Lobzang Chokyi Nyima (1737-1802)
- Konchok Jigme Wangpo (1728-1791)

== Works ==
Changkya Rölpé Dorjé's collected works (gsung 'bum) consist of seven large volumes containing nearly 200 individual texts. He also supervised and participated in the translation of the Kangyur into Manchu (108 volumes) and the entire Tengyur (224 volumes) into Mongolian.

Some of Changkya Rölpé Dorjé's most well known works include:

- The Presentation of Philosophical Systems (གྲུབ་པའི་མཐའ་རྣམ་པར་བཞག་པ་གསལ་བར་བཤད་པ་ཐུབ་བསྟན་ལྷུན་པོའི་མཛེས་རྒྱན) in 3 sections

== See also ==
- Changkya Khutukhtu

== Sources ==
- Berger, Patricia (2003). Empire of Emptiness: Buddhist Art and Political Authority in Qing China. Honolulu: University of Hawai'i Press. ISBN 0-8248-2563-2.
- Bernard, Elisabeth (2004). "The Qianlong emperor and Tibetan Buddhism". In Millward, James A.; Dunnell, Ruth W.; Elliott, Mark C.; et al. (eds.). New Qing Imperial History: The making of Inner Asian empire at Qing Chengde. Taylor & Francis e-Library. pp. 124–135. ISBN 0-203-63093-9.
- Dung dkar blo bzang 'phrin las (2002). Dung dkar tshig mdzod chen mo (v. 1). Beijing: China Tibetology Publishing House. pp. 798–799. ISBN 7-80057-540-3.
- Illich, Marina (2006). Selections from the life of a Tibetan Buddhist polymath: Chankya Rolpai Dorje (lcang skya rol pa'i rdo rje), 1717-1786 (Ph.D.). Columbia University. ISBN 978-0-542-52421-9.
- Illich, Marina (2003). "Imperial Stooge or Emissary to the Dge lugs Throne? Rethinking the Biographies of Chankya Rolpé Dorjé.". In Cuevas, Bryan J.; Schaeffer, Kurtis R. (eds.). Power, Politics, and the Reinvention of Tradition:Tibet in the Seventeenth and Eighteenth Centuries. Leiden: Brill. pp. 17–32. ISBN 978-90-04-15351-6.
- Martin, Dan (2009). "Bonpo Canons and Jesuit Cannons: On Sectarian Factors Involved in the Ch'ien-lung Emperor's Second Gold Stream Expedition of 1771-1776 Based Primarily on Some Tibetan Sources (revised version)". Tibetological.
- Smith, E. Gene (2001). 'The Life of Lcang skya Rol pa'i rdo rje' in Among Tibetan Texts Boston. Somerville: Wisdom Publications. pp. 133–146. ISBN 0-86171-179-3.
- Sullivan, Brenton (2013). The Mother of All Monasteries: Gönlung Jampa Ling and the Rise of Mega Monasteries in Northeastern Tibet (Ph.D.). University of Virginia.
- Townsend, Dominique (March 2010). "The Third Changkya, Rolpai Dorje". The Treasury of Lives.
- Tuttle, Gray (2005). Tibetan Buddhists in the Making of Modern China. New York: Columbia University Press. ISBN 978-0-231-13446-0.
- van Schaik, Sam (2011). Tibet: A History. New Haven: Yale University Press. p. 152. ISBN 978-0-300-19410-4.
- Wang Xiangyun (2000). "The Qing Court's Tibet Connection: Lcang skya Rolpa'i rdo rje and the Qianlong Emperor". Harvard Journal of Asiatic Studies. 60 (1 [June, 2000]). Harvard-Yenching Institute: 125–163. doi:10.2307/2652702. ISSN 0073-0548. JSTOR 2652702.
- "Changkya Rolpé Dorje". Rigpa Wiki. Rigpa.
- "rol pa'i rdo rje (P182)". Tibetan Buddhist Resource Center. TBRC.

Religious titles
Preceded by Changkya Ngawang Losang Chöden	3rd Changkya Khutukhtu; 1717 – 1786	Succeeded by Changkya Yéshé Tenpé Gyeltsen
