= Digital Dharma =

- Film poster
- Directed by: Dafna Yachin
- Written by: Dafna Yachin; Arthur Fischman
- Produced by: Dafna Yachin
- Starring: E. Gene Smith; Matthieu Ricard; Khyentse Norbu; Leonard van der Kuijp
- Cinematography: Wade Muller
- Edited by: Timothy Gates; Kevin Malone; Chip Schofield
- Music by: Michael Aharon
- Distributed by: Lunchbox Communications (USA); Off The Fence (International)
- Release dates: February 20, 2012 (Sedona); March 2, 2013 (United States)
- Running time: 82 minutes
- Countries: United States; Finland
- Language: English

Digital Dharma: One Man's Mission to Save a Culture is a 2012 American documentary film directed by Dafna Yachin. The film depicts the 50-year journey by E. Gene Smith to hunt down and digitize over 20,000 missing volumes of ancient Tibetan text.

Digital Dharma premiered at the 2012 Sedona Film Festival and won awards at film festivals while also screening at museums and universities. It later received a theatrical release and was invited to qualify for Academy Award consideration by the International Documentary Association through the 2012 DocuWeeks program.

Digital Dharma has been called "a divinely inspired gift." Its story and Smith's mission have been described as "undeniably fascinating."

== Overview ==
Digital Dharma tells the story of E. Gene Smith, an American Tibetologist who undertook a mission to digitize historical documents from Tibet. Further, he set out to ensure their continued archival for future generations. Writing of Digital Dharma, Variety said:

Dafna Yachin’s specialty docu is richly informative, not only about Smith’s life and his place in the troubled history of Tibet, but also about the intersection of ancient work and new technologies.

The film includes interviews with Tibetan scholars and experts, including Matthieu Ricard, Khyentse Norbu, and Leonard van der Kuijp.

== Synopsis ==
The story begins with political upheaval in the late 1950s and early 1960s, when multiple Tibetan villages are attacked by China's military. Monasteries are pillaged and destroyed, causing ancient Tibetan and Sanskrit texts to vanish. E. Gene Smith, a Mormon from Ogden, Utah, becomes aware of the situation while studying the Sanskrit and Tibetan languages at the University of Washington. At this time he meets Deshung Rinpoche (1906-87) born in Tibet and one of the first lamas to arrive in the US, having escaped Tibet via a months' long trek with his family and eventual arrival in Seattle 1960. The lack of access to almost any Tibetan or Sanskrit text interferes with Smith's studies; Deshung Rinpoche encourages him to find and recover what he can.

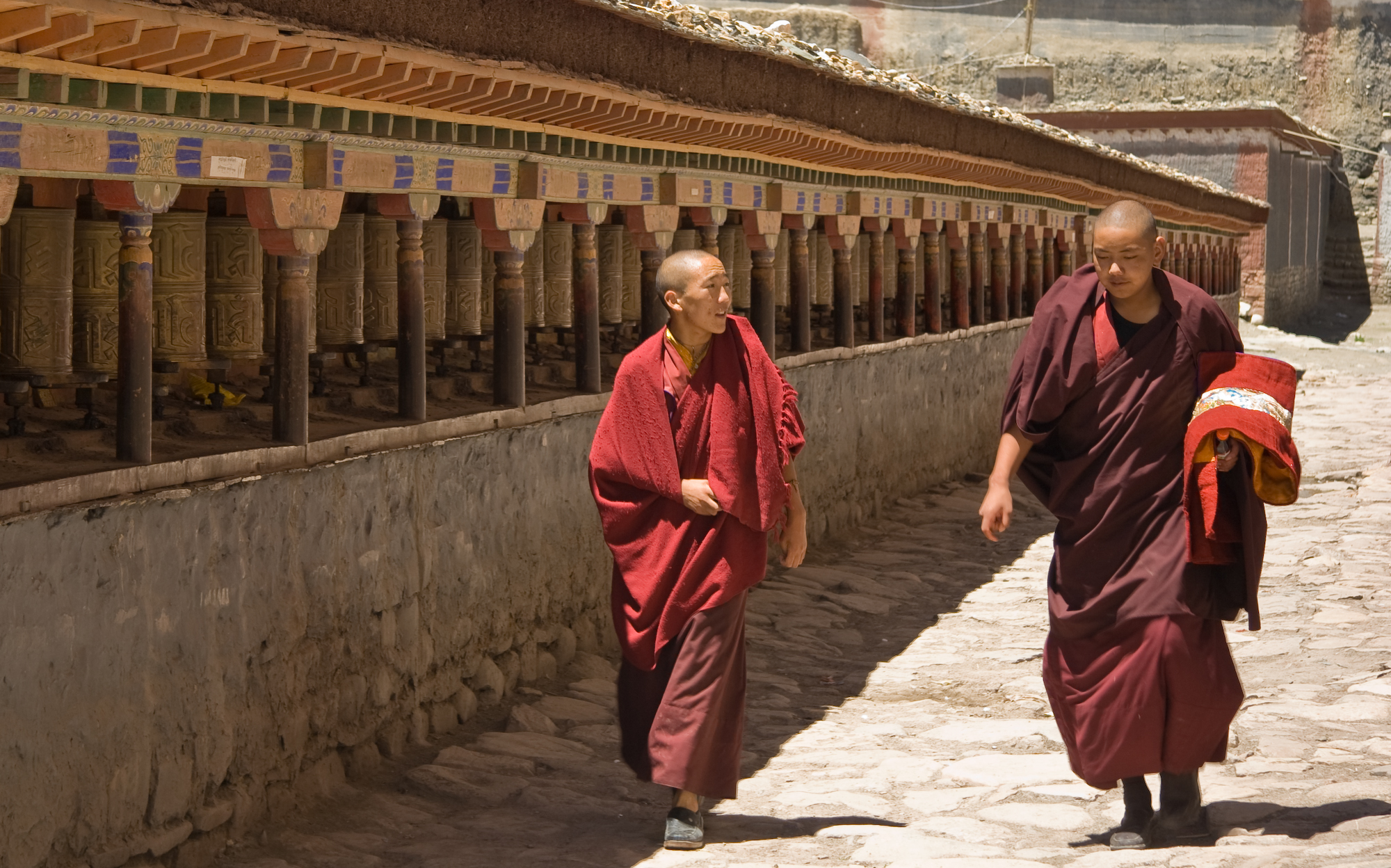
When Tibetan monasteries were pillaged, thousands of ancient texts vanished. Note: An earlier version of above paragraph references Khentse Norbu Rinpoche as Smith's teacher and advisor in 1960; however Khentse Norbu was born in Bhutan in 1961, so was not yet alive in 1960

The mission lasts fifty years. Over the decades, obstacles mount. Ongoing political tensions stemming from Tibet and the People’s Republic of China mean Smith cannot work directly with China to recover many missing texts. While working for the Library of Congress in the 1960s, Smith is suspected of being a spy working on behalf of the CIA, slowing Smith's search. As years pass other political and technical issues hinder progress, but Smith persists with his plan to gather an increasing number of documents over time.

In the late 1990s, Smith sees the emergence of the Internet as a great aid in his goal to preserve Tibetan culture. He creates the first online library of Tibetan documents, with the hope of scanning over 20,000 texts into the database. Then, in 2008, Smith's negotiations with the Chinese come to a halt when Tibetan protests create violence at the Summer Olympics in China.

Despite the halt in progress, Smith continues reaching out to China in hopes of finishing the project. An agreement is finally reached between his organization, the Tibetan Buddhist Resource Center and China to ensure future archival and preservation of the Tibetan texts. However, before Smith can complete the work of digitizing all 20,000 documents, he dies in 2010. People mourn his passing, but praise his work preserving the Tibetan culture.

Writing for The Huffington Post, journalist Maggie Jackson said of Smith's death and the importance of the film:

At his death in 2010, [Smith] left behind a single volume of essays, but an enormous lifework: the preservation and reproduction of tens of thousands of rare, seminal Tibetan texts from a canon integral to the history of Buddhism. In an age when information seems quick, easy and even expendable, the film Digital Dharma should make us think carefully about technology's relationship to replication in our post-analog lives.

== Production ==
As covered by Documentary Magazine, Director Dafna Yachin first met Smith while filming a documentary about philanthropist Peter Gruber. Once she came to understand the scope and importance of Smith's quest, she received his permission to follow him back to India and Nepal to capture his delivery of the first 12,000 digitized texts he had salvaged.

Filming while travelling was demanding. Yachin said, “Delhi was our most difficult place. It’s crowded, and with shooting around the historic monuments, people can give you some issues if you don’t pay the government.”

Raising money for ongoing production was a constant concern. According to Boulder Weekly, the filmmaker said, "Nobody wants to hear a story about a librarian," which made the film a "tough sell." A variety of fundraising methods were used to continue filming, including donations from organizations, individuals, and web platforms Kickstarter and Indiegogo.

In 2010, while still filming, the film's main subject, E. Gene Smith, died. This caused the director to reconsider the production schedule. Said Yachin, "The sudden death of E. Gene Smith in December 2010 underscored my urgency to tell Gene’s remarkable story as soon as possible." Of her hope for the finished film, Yachin stated:

With this feature film, I want viewers to quickly move from asking why to wanting to learn how: how Gene's ultimate mission of collecting, digitizing and distributing all the texts will be accomplished, and perhaps even how the viewers might become agents for accomplishing such a purpose in their own lives.

== Release ==
=== Film festivals ===
Before its official theatrical release, Digital Dharma screened in film festivals, including:

- Sedona International Film Festival
- Cambridge Film Festival
- Cleveland International Film Festival
- Canada International Film Festival
- Boulder International Film Festival
- International Buddhist Film Festival
- Buddhafest
- BendFilm Festival
- Buddhist Film Festival Europe

=== Theatrical release ===
The film received a theatrical release through the 2012 DocuWeeks program. It premiered commercially in Los Angeles on August 10, 2012 and played through August 16, 2012 at the Laemmle NoHo 7. The New York City commercial theatrical release was held at the IFC Center from August 17 through August 23, 2012.

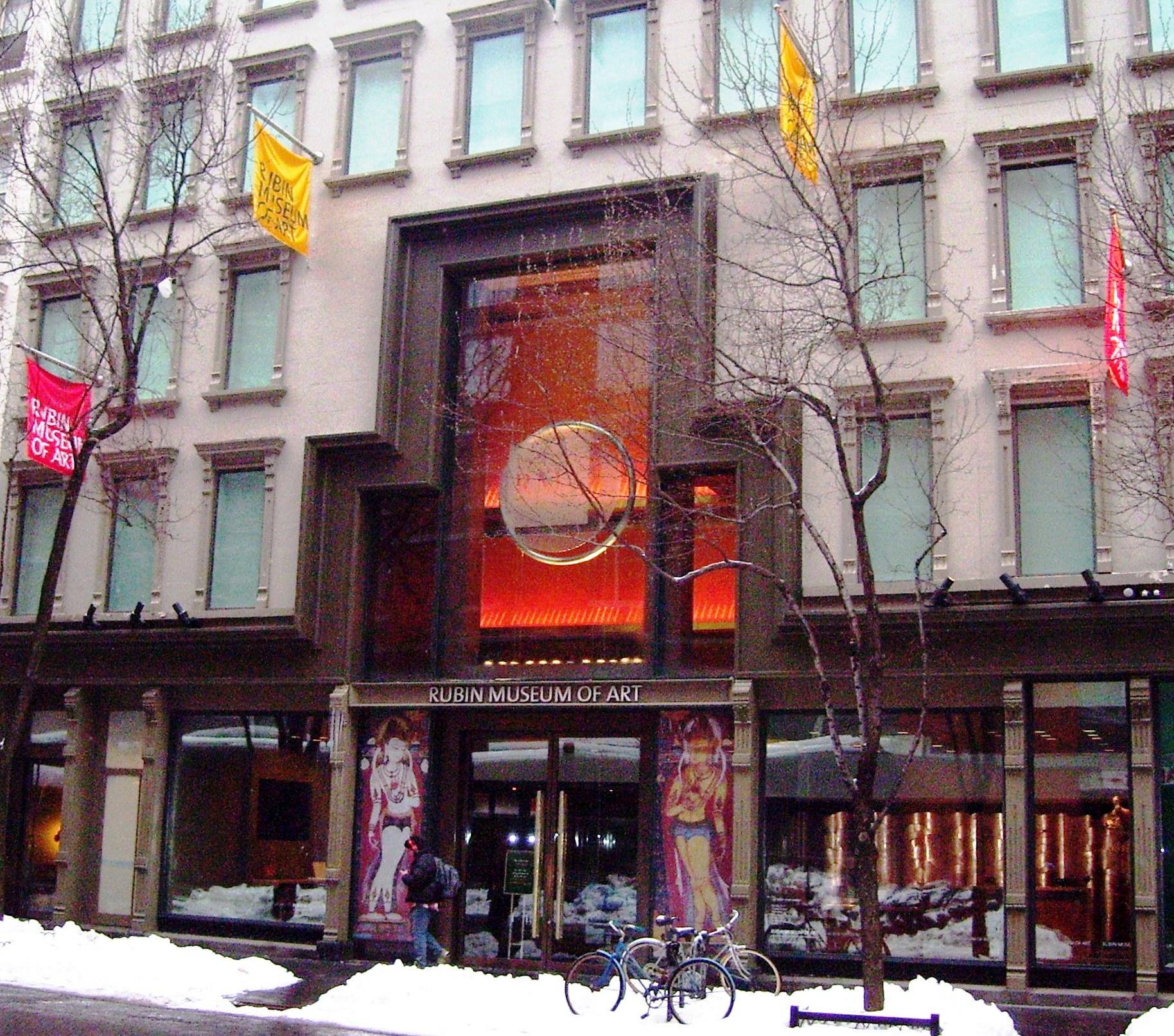
The Rubin Museum of Art screened Digital Dharma.

=== Other screenings ===
During its festival run Digital Dharma also screened in non-traditional spaces, including museums, universities, and cultural centers. Screenings included:

- Rubin Museum of Art
- Tel Aviv Museum of Art
- Association for Asian Studies – Annual Conference
- New York University Abu Dhabi
- The Tibetan Center 2014 Film Series

=== Home and educational viewing ===
DVDs for home viewing and educational institutions are distributed through the official Digital Dharma site and Lunchbox Communications. International distribution is handled by Off The Fence.

== Reception ==
=== Critical reviews ===
Of Digital Dharma, Variety said, "Yachin’s prime achievement lies in making several knotty concepts not just palatable but engrossing," and stated:

A divinely inspired gift for those devoted to Buddhism, preservation and/or a free Tibet, “Digital Dharma” is also an affectionate tribute to the late E. Gene Smith, the scholar, librarian and ex-Mormon who waged a 50-year struggle to save the endangered texts of Tibetan Buddhism.

Barron's thought Smith's story was "told wonderfully in Digital Dharma." The Los Angeles Times called the film "informative if not entirely engaging," and said:

Director Dafna Yachin's use of archival images, including dramatic footage of burning monasteries, striking location shots and interviews with scholars, provides compelling glimpses into history and culture, as well as thoughtful context for events such the Tibetan uprising of 2008. But when the film circles back to Smith, often momentum flags.

Film Journal International thought the documentary introduced audiences to "extraordinary people" but felt the film never quite "built up a head of steam." Libertas Film Magazine gave it a letter grade "B" and said:

Often fascinating, Digital offers viewers some helpful context for understanding Tibetan Buddhism as well as the captive nation’s thorny history over the past seventy years or so. It is also one of the more polished productions seen during this year’s DocuWeeks, featuring some stylish but also informative graphics. Despite prompting some unanswered questions, Digital Dharma tells a great story. In fact, it is the rather rare film that presents both religion and technology in a positive light.

Daily Camera said the film was "both intriguing and frustrating" and stated:

The real problem is that "Digital Dharma" proves too insider. Unless you're passionate about Buddhism (most of us know the Dali Llama and that Buddhists believe all life is sacred), you can find yourself overwhelmed by the forays into the four branches of Buddhism and the significance of individual scrolls.

=== Awards and recognition ===
- DocuWeeks 2012: Invited to qualify for Academy Award consideration by the International Documentary Association
- Sedona International Film Festival: Bill Muller Excellence in Screenwriting Award
- Cleveland International Film Festival: Award for Excellence in Directing by a Woman
