= Mongolian and Tibetan Affairs Commission =

Government body of the Republic of China (1912–2017)

- 蒙藏委員會; Měng-Zàng Wěiyuánhuì

Agency overview
- Formed: April 1912 (as Mongolian and Tibetan Affairs Agency); 1 February 1929 (as MTAC)
- Dissolved: 15 September 2017
- Superseding agency: Mongolian and Tibetan Cultural Center and Mainland Affairs Council
- Jurisdiction: (Republic of China (1912–1949)) Republic of China
- Headquarters: Zhongzheng, Taipei
- Parent agency: Executive Yuan
- Website: www.mtac.gov.tw

Mongolian and Tibetan Affairs Commission
- Traditional Chinese: 蒙藏委員會
- Simplified Chinese: 蒙藏委员会
Transcriptions
Standard Mandarin
- Hanyu Pinyin: Měng-Zàng Wěiyuánhuì
- Wade–Giles: Mêng-Tsang Weiyüanhui
Southern Min
- Hokkien POJ: Bông Chōng Úi-oân-hōe

The Mongolian and Tibetan Affairs Commission (MTAC) was a ministry-level commission of the Executive Yuan in the Republic of China. It was disbanded on 15 September 2017.

== History ==
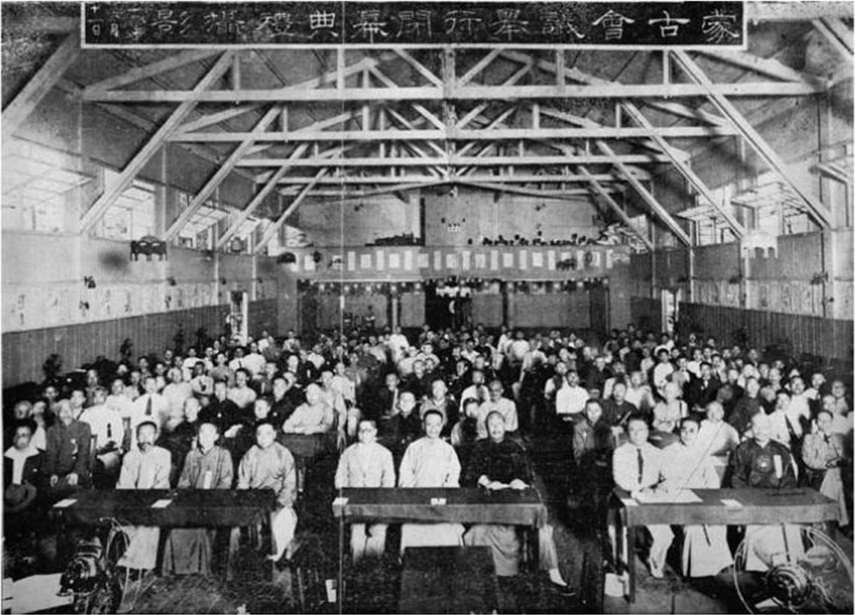
Mongolian Affairs closing conference in 1930.

The first model was created during the Qing dynasty in 1636 as the Mongolian Bureau (Chinese: 蒙古衙門; Manchu: ᠮᠣᠩᡤᠣ
ᠵᡠᡵᡤᠠᠨ), later reformed into the Lifan Yuan (理藩院) in 1639, and oversaw the relationship of the Qing court to its "Feudatory Regions" (Mongolian and Tibetan territories). In 1906, during the reign of the Guangxu Emperor, it was renamed to Ministry of Minority Affairs (理藩部).

Following the Xinhai Revolution and the collapse of the Qing dynasty, the section was replaced by Mongolian and Tibetan Affairs Agency under the Ministry of the Interior in April 1912. In July 1912, the agency was again renamed as Bureau of Mongolian and Tibetan Affairs (蒙藏院) and placed under the State Affairs Yuan. In 1914, it was reorganized and being placed directly under the supervision of President. On 1 February 1929, it was finally changed to Mongolian and Tibetan Affairs Commission (MTAC) in accordance with the Nationalist Government Organizational Law. After the Communist revolution in 1949, and the central government of China's relocation to Taiwan, formerly a Qing province turned colony that was acquired from Japan in 1945 after the end of World War II, the MTAC ceased its activities in Tibet and Mongolia, although it served as a governmental body which assisted in the relationship between ethnic Mongols and Tibetans in Taiwan and increasing the communication between the Taiwanese and the Mongols as well as the Tibetans.

After the 1959 Tibetan uprising, Chiang Kai-shek announced in his Letter to Tibetan Compatriots (Chinese: 告西藏同胞書; pinyin: Gào Xīzàng Tóngbāo Shū) that the ROC's policy would be to help the Tibetan people overthrow the People's Republic of China's rule in Tibet. The MTAC sent secret agents to India to disseminate pro-Kuomintang (KMT) and anti-Communist propaganda among Tibetan exiles. From 1971 to 1978, the MTAC also recruited ethnic Tibetan children from India and Nepal to study in Taiwan, with the expectation that they would work for a ROC government that returned to the mainland.

On 14 August 2017, the Executive Yuan, now led by the independence minded Democratic Progressive Party (DPP) administration, announced that the MTAC would be dissolved by the end of the year. No budget was allocated to the MTAC for 2018. Employees and responsibilities of the commission were reassigned to two places: the Mongolian and Tibetan Cultural Center under the Ministry of Culture, and the expanded Department of Hong Kong, Macao, Inner Mongolia, and Tibet Affairs under the Mainland Affairs Council.

== Organizational structure ==
- Commissioners
- Secretary's Office
- Counselor's Office
- Department of Mongolian Affairs
- Department of Tibetan Affairs
- Department of General Affairs
- Compilation and Translation
- Accounting Office
- Personnel Office
- Civil Service Ethics Office

== Ministers ==
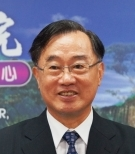
Hsu Jan-yau, the last Minister of Mongolian and Tibetan Affairs Commission.

Political Party: Kuomintang Democratic Progressive Party Non-partisan/unknown

No.	Name	Term of office		Days	Political party	Ancestry (ethnicity)	Premier
1	Yan Xishan (閻錫山)	27 December 1928	5 April 1930	464	Kuomintang	Wutai, Shanxi	Tan Yankai
2	Ma Fuxiang (馬福祥)	8 September 1930	30 December 1931	478	Kuomintang	Linxia, Gansu (Hui)	Tan Yankai; Chiang Kai-shek I
3	Shi Qingyang (石青陽)	30 December 1931	15 March 1935	1171	Kuomintang	Ba County, Sichuan	Sun Fo I Wang Jingwei
4	Huang Mu-sung (黃慕松)	15 March 1935	29 July 1936	502	Kuomintang	Meichuan, Guangdong	Wang Jingwei; Chiang Kai-shek II
5	Lin Yungai (林雲陔)	29 July 1936	8 August 1936	10	Kuomintang	Xinyi, Guangdong	Chiang Kai-shek II
6	Wu Zhongxin (吳忠信)	8 August 1936	6 December 1944	3042	Kuomintang	Hefei, Anhui	Chiang Kai-shek II; H. H. Kung; Chiang Kai-shek III
7	Leung Kam Lo (羅良鑒)	6 December 1944	23 April 1947	868	Kuomintang	Shanhua, Hunan	Chiang Kai-shek III; T. V. Soong
8	Xu Shiying (許世英)	23 April 1947	26 November 1948	642	Kuomintang	Qiupu, Anhui	Zhang Qun; Weng Wenhao
9	Serengdongrub (白雲梯)	26 November 1948	6 June 1949	192	Kuomintang	Harqin Middle Banner, Rehe (Mongol)	Sun Fo II; He Yingqin
10	Guan Jiyu (關吉玉)	6 June 1949	23 November 1949	170	Kuomintang	Liaoyang, Liaoning (Manchu)	He Yingqin; Yan Xishan
11	Zhou Kuntian (周昆田)	23 November 1949	10 March 1950	107	Kuomintang	Hefei, Anhui	Yan Xishan
12	Yu Ching-tang (余井塘)	10 March 1950	22 February 1951	349	Kuomintang	Dongtai, Jiangsu	Chen Cheng I
13	Tien Chung-chin (田炯錦)	22 February 1951	25 May 1954	1188	Kuomintang	Qingyang, Gansu	Chen Cheng I
14	Liu Lianke (劉廉克)	25 May 1954	14 July 1958	1511	Kuomintang	Harqin Left Banner, Rehe (Mongol)	Chen Cheng I Yu Hung-Chun
15	Lee Yong-xin (李永新)	14 July 1958	30 May 1960	686	Kuomintang	Harqin Left Banner, Rehe (Mongol)	Chen Cheng II
16	Tien Chung-chin (田炯錦)	30 May 1960	14 December 1963	1293	Kuomintang	Qingyang, Gansu	Chen Cheng II
17	Kuo Chi-chiao (郭寄嶠)	14 December 1963	29 May 1972	3089	Kuomintang	Hefei, Anhui	Chen Cheng II; Yen Chia-kan
18	Chui Yan Cui (崔垂言)	29 May 1972	November 1981		Kuomintang	Changchun, Jilin	Yen Chia-kan; Chiang Ching-kuo; Sun Yun-suan
19	Xie Renyang (薛人仰)	November 1981	May 1984		Kuomintang	Fuzhou, Fujian	Sun Yun-suan
20	Dong Shufan (董樹藩)	May 1984	March 1986		Kuomintang	Sa County, Suiyuan	Sun Yun-suan; Yu Kuo-hua
21	Wu Hua-peng (吳化鵬)	April 1986	26 February 1993		Kuomintang	Aohan Right Banner, Rehe (Mongol)	Yu Kuo-hua; Lee Huan; Hau Pei-tsun
22	Zhang Junyi (張駿逸)	27 February 1993	14 December 1994	655	Kuomintang	Changsha, Hunan	Lien Chan
23	Lee Hou-kao (李厚高)	15 December 1994	31 August 1997	990	Kuomintang	Songzi, Hubei	Lien Chan
24	Kao Koong-lian (高孔廉)	1 September 1997	19 May 2000	991	Kuomintang	Minhou, Fujian	Vincent Siew
25	Hsu Cheng-kuang (徐正光)	20 May 2000	31 January 2002	621		Pingtung, Taiwan	Tang Fei; Chang Chun-hsiung I
26	Hsu Chih-hsiung (許志雄)	1 February 2002	19 May 2008	2299	Democratic Progressive Party	Keelung, Taiwan	Yu Shyi-kun; Frank Hsieh; Su Tseng-chang; Chang Chun-hsiung II
27	Kao Su-po (高思博)	20 May 2008	8 February 2011	994	Kuomintang	Tainan City	Liu Chao-shiuan; Wu Den-yih
28	Luo Ying-shay (羅瑩雪)	9 February 2011	29 September 2013	963	Kuomintang	Shuangfeng, Hunan	Wu Den-yih; Chen Chun; Jiang Yi-huah
—	Chen Ming-jen (陳明仁)	30 September 2013	22 October 2013	22		Chiayi County, Taiwan	Jiang Yi-huah
29	Jaclyn Tsai (蔡玉玲)	22 October 2013	19 May 2016	940	Independent	Taiwan	Jiang Yi-huah; Mao Chi-kuo; Chang San-cheng
30	Lin Mei-chu (林美珠)	20 May 2016	7 February 2017	263	Independent	Taipei City	Lin Chuan
31	Hsu Jan-yau (許璋瑤)	8 February 2017	15 September 2017	219	Independent	Kaohsiung City	Lin Chuan; William Lai

== Other notable members ==
- Thubten Choekyi Nyima, 9th Panchen Lama
- Wu Heling
- Pandatsang Rapga

== Mongolian and Tibetan Cultural Center ==
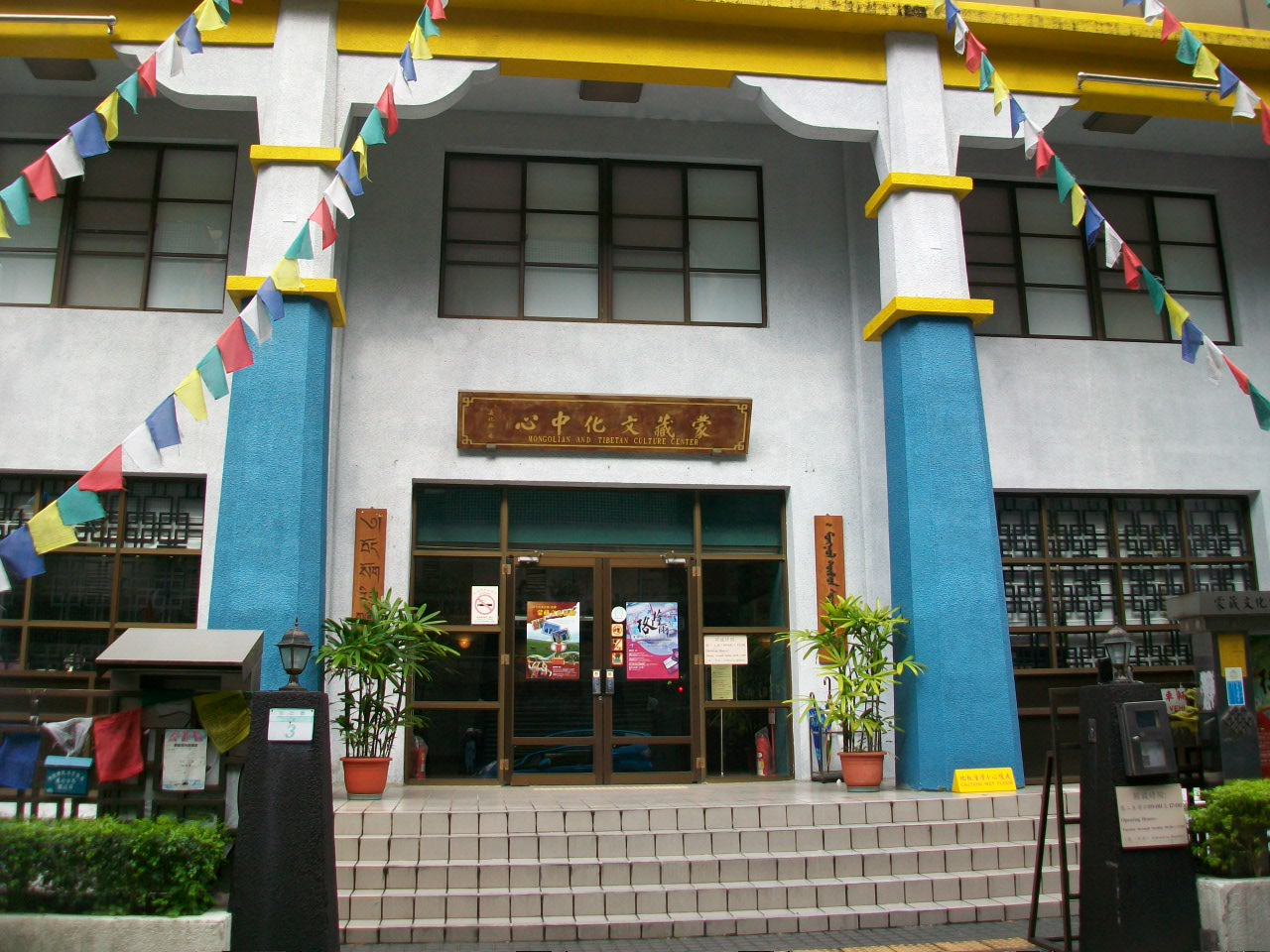
Mongolian and Tibetan Cultural Center

The Mongolian and Tibetan Cultural Center (Chinese: 蒙藏文化中心; pinyin: Měng-Zàng Wénhuà Zhōngxīn) was originally managed by the Mongolian and Tibetan Affairs Commission. It is located in the Daan District of Taipei on Qingtian Street near the Taipei Grand Mosque and Mandarin Training Center. The center was established in 1993 in the former residence of the Changkya Khutukhtu, Lobsang Pelden Tenpe Dronme, who fled to Taiwan after the Chinese Civil War in 1949. The building incorporates traditional Tibetan architectural features. It also includes an exhibition area for cultural artifacts, a reading room, lecture hall and prayer hall for the Changkya Khutukhtu. After the commission was disbanded, the center's management was turned over to the Ministry of Culture.

== See also ==
- Executive Yuan
- Republic of China (1912–49)
- Tibet (1912–51)
- Mongolia (1911–24)
- Mongolia–Taiwan relations
  - Mongolians in Taiwan

Similar government agencies

- Bureau of Buddhist and Tibetan Affairs (Yuan dynasty)
- Lifan Yuan (Qing dynasty)
- State Ethnic Affairs Commission (People's Republic of China)
