= The Treasury of Lives =

Biographical encyclopedia of the Himalayas

- Language: English
- Edited by: Alexander Gardner; Catherine Tsuji

Publication details
- Open access: yes

Standard abbreviations
- ISO 4: Treas. Lives

Indexing
- ISSN: 2332-077X

Links
- Journal homepage

The Treasury of Lives is an online, open access, peer reviewed, collection of biographical essays, which can be seen as an encyclopedia of historical figures from Tibet, India, Inner Asia, and the Himalayan Region.

== Background ==
The Treasury of Lives is an online series of biographical essays, used as an encyclopedia, that was established in 2007 with the mission of providing open access to the lived history of Tibet and surrounding regions. Biographies are intended for a wide audience of scholars, independent researchers and practitioners. Essays cover a wide range of figures, from Buddhist masters to artists and political officials, most of which are peer reviewed. Website localization into Tibetan and Chinese languages in is progress in order to meet the growing numbers of users active in those languages.

The Treasury of Lives is a collaborative resource with over 150 contributing authors. It has published over 1500 biographies. Many essays are peer-reviewed and benefit from extensive internal and external links to associated art, maps, place descriptions, family and clan information, and timelines.

The Treasury of Lives was originally known as The Tibetan Lineages Project, led by Moke Mokotoff, Matthieu Ricard and Vivian Kurz. Alexander Gardner serves as the executive director and Editor in Chief. The Treasury of Lives is also closely linked with Buddhist Digital Resource Center (BDRC, formerly known as TBRC). The late E. Gene Smith and Jeff Wallman of the BDRC were instrumental in defining the vision of the site and in forging the plan for its development; and its database is closely linked to BDRC.

The project was initially funded and incubated by the Shelley and Donald Rubin Foundation. It became an independent non-profit organization in 2017.

== Notable authors ==
Notable authors of the biographies in The Treasury of Lives who have Wikipedia articles include:

- Samten Karmay - Director of Research Emeritus at Institut National des Langues et Civilisations Orientales (CNRS), Paris
- Jamyang Norbu - Tibetan political activist and writer
- Gyurme Dorje (1950-2020) - Scottish Tibetologist and writer
- Matthew Kaptsein - scholar of Tibetan religions, Buddhism, and the cultural effects of the Chinese occupation of Tibet
- Françoise Pommaret - director of research at the Institut National des Langues et Civilisations Orientales (CNRS) in Paris
- Jeff Watt - scholar and curator of Himalayan and Tibetan Art
- Tsering Shakya - Institute of Asian Research (IAR) at the University of British Columbia
- E. Gene Smith (1936 –2010) - Tibetologist
- Karma Phuntsho - Bhutanese scholar who specialises in Buddhism, Tibetan & Himalayan Studies and Bhutan
- Matthieu Ricard - Nepalese French writer, photographer, translator and Buddhist monk
- John Powers - Australian scholar of Asian Studies and Buddhism

== Sources ==
- Samuel, Geoffrey. "Useful Websites". Introducing Tibetan Buddhism. Routledge.
