= Lisa Ross =

Lisa Ross may refer to:

- Lisa Ross (photographer)
- Lisa Ross (sailor)
