= Mongolian Taiwanese =

Mongolian Taiwanese or Taiwanese Mongolian may refer to:

- Mongolians in Taiwan
- Multiracial people of Taiwanese and Mongolian descent
- Mongolia–Taiwan relations
