= The Cambodia Project =

The Cambodia Project (CPI) is a US nonprofit organization whose mission is to develop secondary education opportunities for underserved children in rural Cambodia. The Cambodia Project is a 501(c)(3)

== History ==
The Cambodia Project was founded in 2006 by Jean-Michel Tijerina, after a trip to Cambodia during which he discovered a need for improved access to basic infrastructure and education. The organization is managed by New York and Cambodia staff. Development professionals and students from international graduate schools provide technical advice in areas such as education planning and economic development. The schools include Columbia University, Institut d'Études Politiques de Paris (Sciences Po), University of Texas at Austin, and Stanford University. The organization's main priorities are to:

- Rebuild the secondary school education system
- Build schools in rural areas of Cambodia not served by other schools
- Provide children access to secondary education regardless of their gender, ethnicity, religion, or disabilities.

== Mission ==
The Cambodia Project's mission is to provide inclusive education to all children from grades 7 to 12, encouraging them to think critically and providing them with vocational skills. Today, only 31% of children and 28% of girls are enrolled in secondary school.

== Programs ==
The Cambodia Project works with three communities south of Phnom Penh. One is in Kep municipality, while the others are in Takéo and Kandal provinces. The government of Cambodia and the World Food Programme recognize the populations in these areas as among the country’s most vulnerable.

The first school is located on the border of Kep and Kampot in order to allow tuition paid by working-class families in Kampot to subsidize tuition for the most needy in Kep.

The Cambodia Project collaborates with local government officials and communities to establish replicable school models, provide educational resources, and train teachers in both the public and private education systems. The CPI model is designed to ensure that each school achieves financial self-reliance and local management within a four-year period.

=== Education Objectives ===
CPI employs educators from a pool of qualified public school teachers in the region and recruits graduates from local teacher training colleges. One-third of teachers work part-time from neighboring public schools. School management committees and community task forces support teacher monitoring and evaluation.

=== Comprehensive Healthcare ===
Illness that takes children out of the classroom is a major barrier to secondary education. CPI planned to establish an onsite health clinic to provide care for simple health needs, as well as referrals for more complex health conditions.

=== Environmental Sustainability ===
Cambodia Project schools are designed to be environmentally sustainable, based on LEED standards, by deploying energy-efficient technologies, efficient utilization of resources, and environmental education. School design allows students to experience the operation and maintenance of green technology as part of vocational training.

=== Economic Sustainability ===
To finance school operation, CPI developed a sustainable funding model, which is a combination of diverse revenue-generating streams. For example, microfinance provides loans for tuition. The aim is to facilitate economic development. Revenues will be utilized for scholarships to subsidize the lowest-income students. Other anticipated revenue streams are an agriculture program, crafts, ecotourism, and strategic partnerships with NGOs to provide conditional cash grants to families to ensure student attendance, tuition subsidies, and equitable teacher salaries and incentives.

=== Implementation and Fundraising ===
Corporate support for CPI comes from Google, the Shelley and Donald Rubin Foundation, the Susan Hartwig Family Fund, Michiels Architecture & Partners, Weil, Gotshal & Manges LLP, and Raffles Hotels.

=== Summer 2008 ===
In the summer of 2008, the in-country field team undertook a series of activities to prepare for school construction. This included selecting the site, recruiting local contractors and architects, initiating engineering plans, conducting needs assessments with students and families, exploring revenue generation options, researching Khmer curriculum and teacher training, engaging with government officials and NGOs for research and partnerships, and presenting a medical needs assessment for the school community.

=== Summer 2009 ===
On June 1, 2009 twenty of the organization's 84 members traveled to Cambodia. The team spent the summer recruiting and training teachers, in collaboration with Takéo Teacher Training College. To develop a health clinic for the students and their families, part of the team will be working with local hospitals and clinics in Takéo and Kep.

A documentary filmmaker accompanied the team.
