= Chuzang =

Tibetan Buddhist monastery in Huzhu, Qinghai, China

Coordinates: 37.0032°N 101.9041°E

Chuzang Monastery
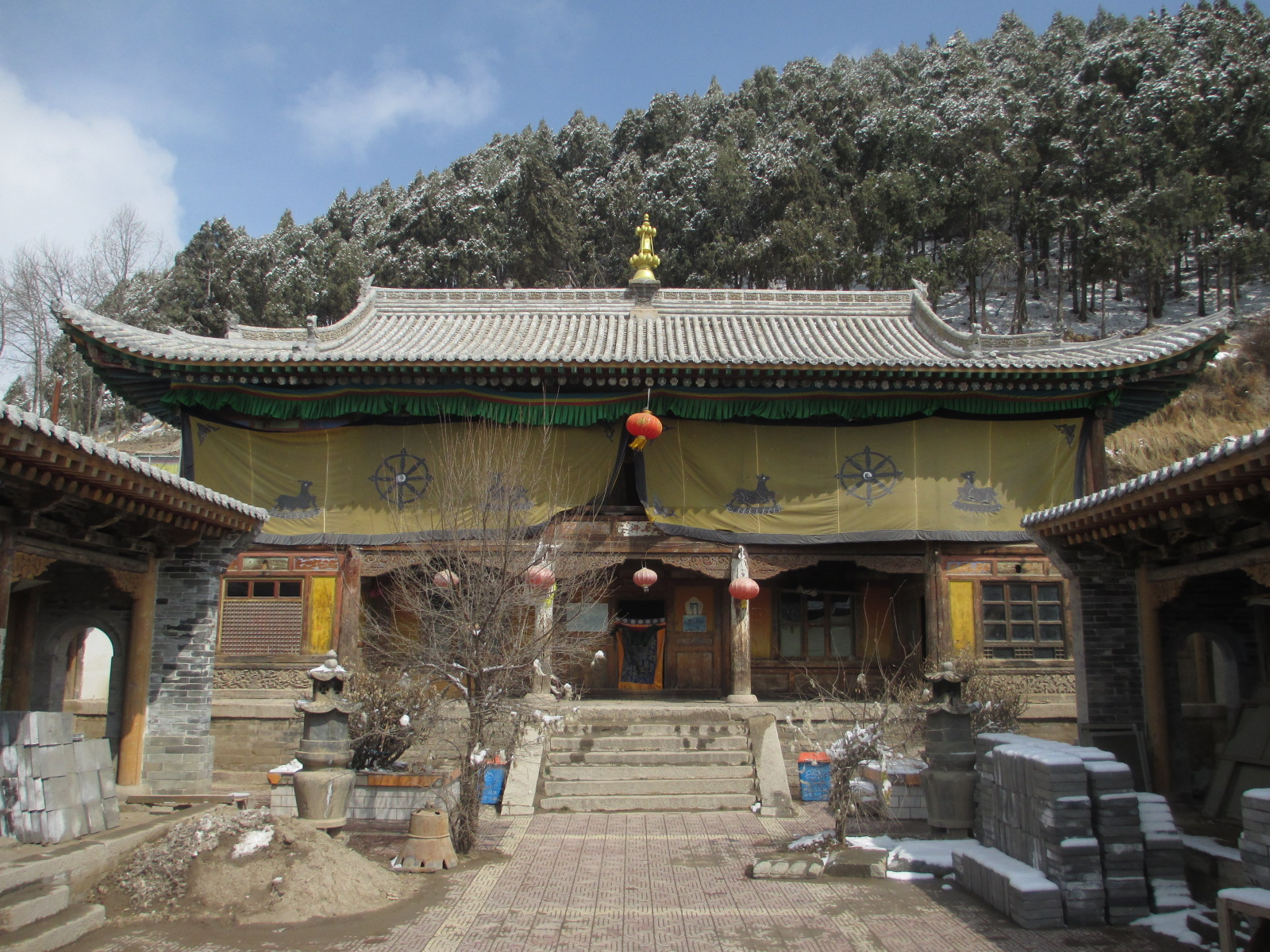

Religion
- Affiliation: Tibetan Buddhism
- Sect: Gelug

Location
- Location: Huzhu County, Qinghai, China
- Interactive map of Chuzang Monastery

Chuzang Monastery (whole name: Chuzang Gön Ganden Mingyur Ling; Tibetan: ཆུ་བཟང་དགོན་, Wylie: chu bzang dgon, ZWPY: chu zang gön; simplified Chinese: 却藏寺; traditional Chinese: 卻藏寺; pinyin: Quèzàng Sì) is a Tibetan Buddhist monastery of Gelug sect in the Huzhu County of Qinghai province, China. The monastery was founded in 1649 during the reign of the Khoshut Mongols inside the Khoshut Khanate (1642 – 1717). In the 1950s it had about 150 monks. During the Cultural revolution it was mostly destroyed and since has been recovered.

Chuzang is one of 4 famous Tibetan monasteries (Chuzang, Serkhog, Jakhyung and Gonlung) in north-east Qinghai, area considered as borders between Tibet and China.
