= Mongolian and Tibetan Cultural Center =

Cultural center in Da'an, Taipei, Taiwan

- 蒙藏文化中心
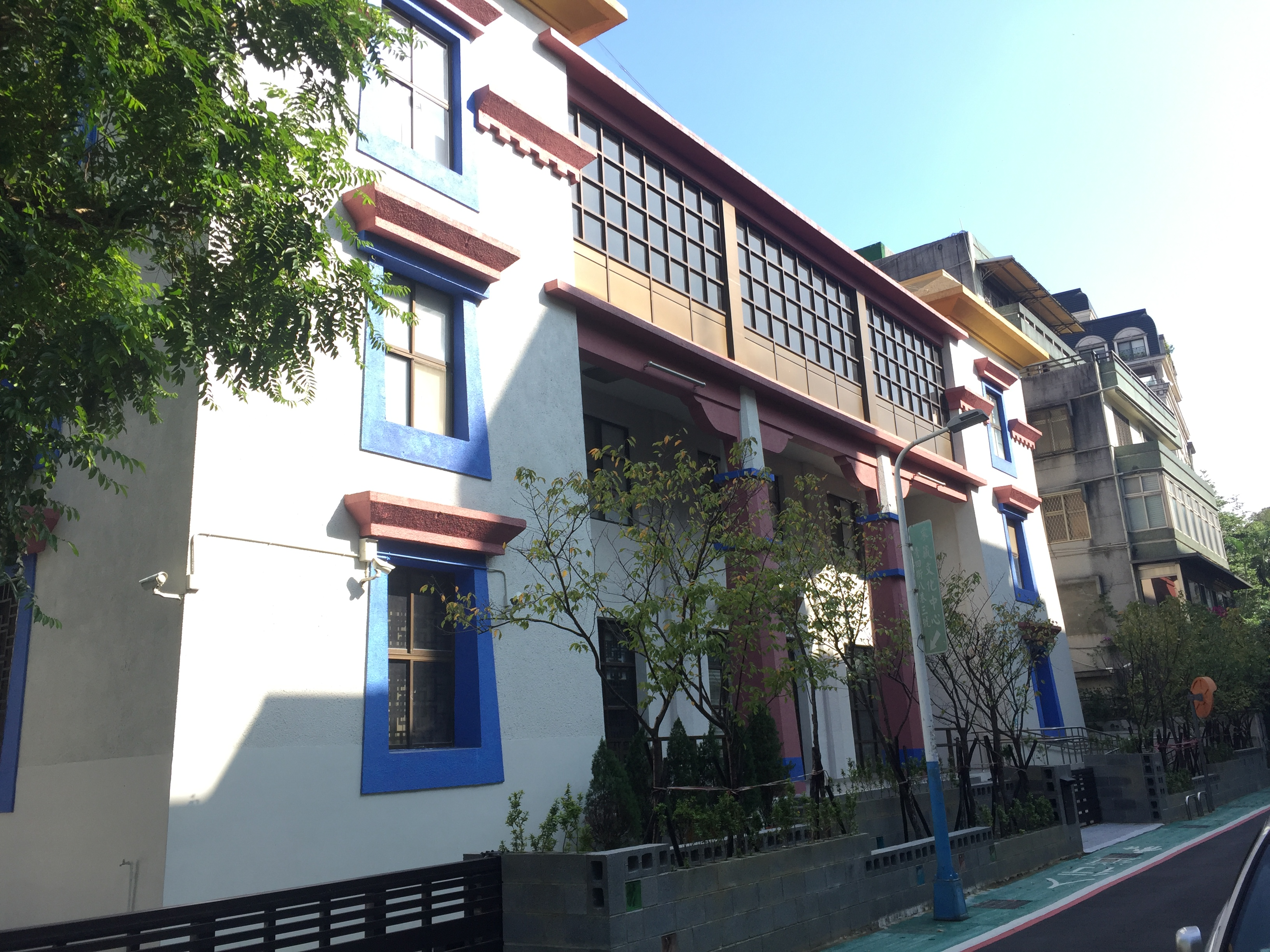
- Interactive map of the Mongolian and Tibetan Cultural Center area

General information
- Type: cultural center
- Location: Da'an, Taipei, Taiwan
- Coordinates: 25°01′40″N 121°31′53″E
- Opened: February 1993

The Mongolian and Tibetan Cultural Center (Chinese: 蒙藏文化中心; pinyin: Měng Zàng Wénhuà Zhōngxīn) is a cultural center in Da'an District, Taipei, Taiwan under the administration of the Ministry of Culture. It was previously under the Mongolian and Tibetan Affairs Commission of the Executive Yuan, which in 2017 had its duties absorbed into the Ministry of Culture and the Mainland Affairs Council's Department of Hong Kong, Macao, Inner Mongolia, and Tibet Affairs.

== History ==
The ROC government established the cultural center at the residence of the 7th Changkya Khutukhtu Lobsang Pelden Tenpe Dronme in February 1993.

== Objectives ==
The center has the following objectives:

- Promote the Mongolian and Tibetan cultures
- Increase people's understanding of the Mongolian and Tibetan peoples
- Advance Mongolian and Tibetan academic standards

== Facilities ==
The center has the following facilities:

=== First and second floor ===
- Exhibition area for cultural artifacts

=== Third and fourth floor ===
- Reading room
- Lecture hall
- Conference room
- Memorial prayer hall for the 7th Changkya Khutukhtu

== Transportation ==
The center is accessible within walking distance east from Guting Station of the Taipei Metro.

== See also ==
- List of museums in Taiwan
- List of tourist attractions in Taiwan
- Mongolian and Tibetan Affairs Commission
- Mongolians in Taiwan
