= Huzhu Tu Autonomous County =

Huzhu 互助县
- Autonomous County
- 互助土族自治县; Huzhu Tu Autonomous County; Huzhu Mongghul njeenaa dagnagu xan
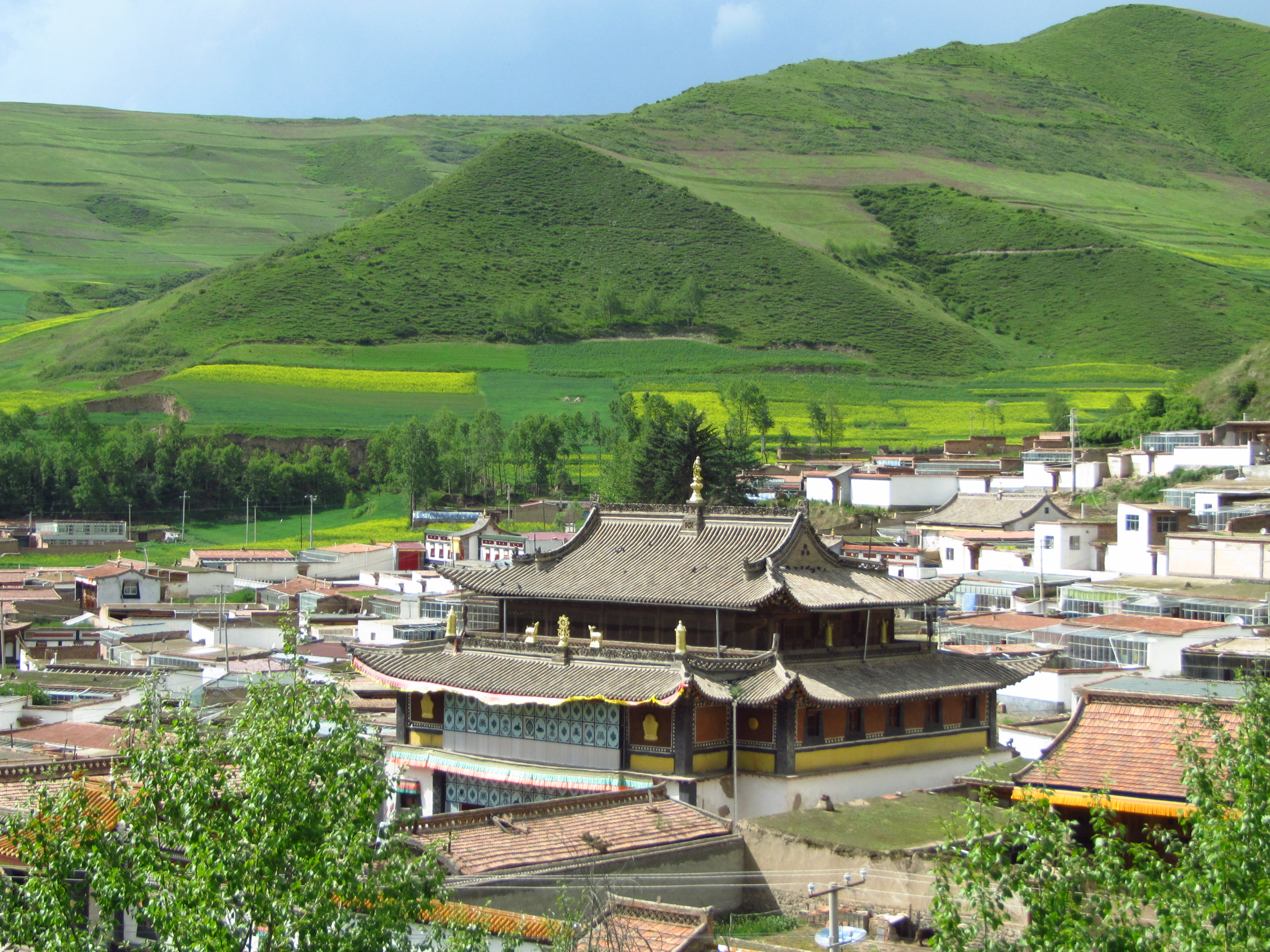
- Gönlung Jampa Ling monastery in Huzhu County

- Location of the seat in Qinghai
- Coordinates: 36°51′N 102°06′E
- Country: China
- Province: Qinghai
- Prefecture-level city: Haidong
- County seat: Weiyuan Town

Area
  - Total: 3,424 km^{2} (1,322 sq mi)

Population (2019)
  - Total: 438,067
  - Density: 127.9/km^{2} (331.4/sq mi)
- Time zone: UTC+8 (China Standard)
- Website: https://www.huzhu.gov.cn/

Huzhu Tu Autonomous County

Chinese name
- Simplified Chinese: 互助土族自治县
- Traditional Chinese: 互助土族自治縣
Transcriptions
Standard Mandarin
- Hanyu Pinyin: Hùzhù Tǔzú Zìzhìxiàn

Tibetan name
- Tibetan: ཧུའུ་ཀྲུའུ་ཐུའུ་རིགས་རང་སྐྱོང་རྫོང་། or དགོན་ལུང་རྫོང་།
Transcriptions
- Wylie: huʼu kruʼu thuʼu rigs rang skyong rdzong or dgon lung rdzong

Huzhu Tu Autonomous County (Chinese: 互助土族自治县; Monguor: Huzhu Mongghul njeenaa dagnagu xan), or in short Huzhu County (互助县), is an autonomous county under the jurisdiction of the prefecture-level city of Haidong, in the east of Qinghai province, China, bordering Gansu province to the northeast. It has an area of 3,321 km^{2} (1,282 sq mi) and approximately 370,000 inhabitants (2004). Its seat is the town of Weiyuan.

The monastery of Chuzang, located in the town of Nanmenxia some 20 km (12 mi) northwest of the seat of Huzhu County, is listed as a national monument of China (since 2006).

The Xining Caojiabao Airport (IATA: XNN, ICAO: ZLXN) which serves Xining, capital of Qinghai Province, is located in the county.

== Administrative divisions ==
Huzhu is divided into 1 subdistrict, 7 towns, 9 townships, and 2 ethnic townships.

- Gaozhai Subdistrict (高寨街道)
- Weiyuan Town (威远镇)
- Danma Town (丹麻镇)
- Nanmenxia Town (南门峡镇)
- Jiading Town (加定镇)
- Tangchuan Town (塘川镇)
- Wushi Town (五十镇)
- Wufeng Town (五峰镇)
- Taizi Township (台子乡)
- Xishan Township (西山乡)
- Hongyazigou Township (红崖子沟乡)
- Halazhigou Township (哈拉直沟乡)
- Dongshan Township (东山乡)
- Donghe Township (东和乡)
- Donggou Township (东沟乡)
- Linchuan Township (林川乡)
- Caijiabu Township (蔡家堡乡)
- Pasa Tibetan Township (巴扎藏族乡, བ་བཟའ་བོད་རིགས་ཞང་།)
- Sumdo Tibetan Township (松多藏族乡, སུམ་མདོ་བོད་རིགས་ཞང་།)

== Climate ==
Climate data for Huzhu, elevation 2,480 m (8,140 ft), (1991–2020 normals, extremes 1981–2010)
Month	Jan	Feb	Mar	Apr	May	Jun	Jul	Aug	Sep	Oct	Nov	Dec	Year
Record high °C (°F)	13.6 (56.5)	18.8 (65.8)	24.2 (75.6)	30.2 (86.4)	27.5 (81.5)	28.8 (83.8)	34.9 (94.8)	31.4 (88.5)	27.8 (82.0)	22.3 (72.1)	17.4 (63.3)	13.0 (55.4)	34.9 (94.8)
Mean daily maximum °C (°F)	1.1 (34.0)	4.5 (40.1)	9.2 (48.6)	14.8 (58.6)	18.2 (64.8)	21.0 (69.8)	23.0 (73.4)	22.3 (72.1)	18.0 (64.4)	13.0 (55.4)	7.5 (45.5)	2.6 (36.7)	12.9 (55.3)
Daily mean °C (°F)	−9.2 (15.4)	−5.1 (22.8)	0.6 (33.1)	6.5 (43.7)	10.7 (51.3)	13.9 (57.0)	15.8 (60.4)	14.9 (58.8)	10.8 (51.4)	5.0 (41.0)	−1.8 (28.8)	−7.5 (18.5)	4.6 (40.2)
Mean daily minimum °C (°F)	−16.7 (1.9)	−12.4 (9.7)	−5.8 (21.6)	−0.3 (31.5)	4.0 (39.2)	7.4 (45.3)	9.6 (49.3)	9.2 (48.6)	5.8 (42.4)	−0.2 (31.6)	−7.9 (17.8)	−14.5 (5.9)	−1.8 (28.7)
Record low °C (°F)	−28.3 (−18.9)	−26.3 (−15.3)	−23.6 (−10.5)	−11.6 (11.1)	−7.2 (19.0)	−0.9 (30.4)	0.7 (33.3)	0.1 (32.2)	−3.7 (25.3)	−16.4 (2.5)	−24.3 (−11.7)	−31.9 (−25.4)	−31.9 (−25.4)
Average precipitation mm (inches)	2.7 (0.11)	3.5 (0.14)	13.5 (0.53)	26.3 (1.04)	64.6 (2.54)	79.2 (3.12)	97.2 (3.83)	104.8 (4.13)	82.3 (3.24)	31.9 (1.26)	6.7 (0.26)	1.7 (0.07)	514.4 (20.27)
Average precipitation days (≥ 0.1 mm)	4.4	4.9	6.6	8.1	13.1	16.5	17.2	15.9	16.5	9.3	4.1	3.1	119.7
Average snowy days	6.3	7.1	9.0	5.4	1.3	0.1	0	0	0.2	3.8	5.5	5.3	44
Average relative humidity (%)	52	50	52	53	59	66	72	74	76	70	62	55	62
Mean monthly sunshine hours	212.0	206.4	228.9	233.5	236.2	221.2	224.9	210.4	179.6	202.0	211.6	210.4	2,577.1
Percentage possible sunshine	68	67	61	59	54	51	51	51	49	59	70	71	59
Source: China Meteorological Administration

== See also ==
- List of administrative divisions of Qinghai
