= Mongolians in Taiwan =

Small ethnic minority in Taiwan

Total population
- 515 (April 2013)

Regions with significant populations
- Taichung: 118
- Taipei: 115
- Hualien County: 52
- Kaohsiung: 49
- Taoyuan City: 40

Religion
- Tibetan Buddhism

Related ethnic groups
- Mongolians

Mongolians in Taiwan (Chinese: 在臺蒙古人; pinyin: Zài tái ménggǔ rén) form a small portion of the island's population. Labour migration from Mongolia to Taiwan began in 2004.

== Migration from Inner Mongolia ==
There were a few ethnic Mongols from Inner Mongolia – citizens of the Republic of China, not of Outer Mongolia – who came with the Kuomintang during their 1949 retreat from mainland China after losing the Chinese Civil War. According to 1959 statistics from the Mongolian and Tibetan Affairs Commission, there were 139 Mongol households with a total of 431 people in Taiwan, most of them belonging to Josotu, Jirem, and Ju Ud leagues. One of the most prominent such people to flee with the KMT was the 7th Changkya Khutukhtu, Lobsang Pelden Tenpe Dronme, who fled mainland China in 1949 and lived in Taipei until 1957. Others were Wu Heling and Serengdongrub.

== Migrant workers ==
There was little contact between Mongolia and Taiwan until the 21st century. Authorities on Taiwan began laying the groundwork for the importation of migrant labourers from Mongolia as early as 2002, with the establishment of a Taipei Economic and Cultural Representative Office in the Mongolian capital of Ulaanbaatar and implementation of a system for checking the criminal records of prospective migrants. The plan initially faced opposition; a former chairman of the Mongolian and Tibetan Affairs Commission said it was "diplomatic pork barrel" and a covert attempt by the Democratic Progressive Party to push their platform of de-Sinicization by expanding bilateral ties with Mongolia, which the Republic of China government had previously considered to be Chinese territory and not an independent country.

Taiwan's Council of Labor Affairs finally gave their approval for the recruitment of Mongolian workers in January 2004. The initial response in Mongolia was strong, with Mongolia's Central Employment Office reporting that over 20,000 people had expressed interest in a professional skills and Chinese-language training course for workers headed to Taiwan. 7,000 people were eventually admitted to the programme; 90% of applicants were between 20 and 35 years of age, and 45% were female. One Mongolian official said that Taiwan offered better employment conditions for migrant workers than traditional destinations including Japan, South Korea, or Eastern European countries, including higher wages (five times those offered in Mongolia) and the provision of health insurance. The first workers recruited under the programme, a group of eleven female nurses between the ages of 25 and 40, arrived in mid-May 2004; the second batch was scheduled to arrive the following month. By September of that same year, a total of 77 Mongolians had come to Taiwan for work. The Mongolian workers had trouble adjusting to life in Taiwan; by January 2005, out of the 100 who had arrived so far, over 30 had chosen the option of early return to Mongolia. Difficulties cited included long working hours and objections from employers that female employees wore clothing considered too revealing when the weather was hot.

== Students ==
Aside from migrant workers, as of 2007 there were also a total of 100 Mongolian students studying at universities in Taiwan; a total of 1,700 Mongolians had gone to Taiwan for professional training, especially in the legal field.

== Notable people ==
- Chia-ying Yeh, Canadian poet and writer
- Xi Murong, writer and painter
- Chien Te-men, actor
- Lobsang Pelden Tenpe Dronme, religious leaders
- Serengdongrub, politician
- Wu Heling, politician

== See also ==
- Mongolian and Tibetan Cultural Center
