= Sara Reisman =

New York-based curator

Sara Reisman is a New York-based curator, educator, and writer. She was formerly Chief Curator and Director of National Academician Affairs at the National Academy of Design (2021–2025) and Executive and Artistic Director of the Shelley and Donald Rubin Foundation (2014–2021). Prior to that, she served as Director of the City of New York Department of Cultural Affairs Percent for Art Program (2008–2014) and Associate Dean of the School of Art, The Cooper Union. She received her B.A. from the University of Chicago, and attended the Whitney Museum Independent Study Program from 2002 to 2003.

== Curatorial projects ==
Reisman has curated numerous shows, including at the Futura Centre for Contemporary Art in Prague, the Queens Museum of Art, Socrates Sculpture Park, the Cooper Union School of Art, the Philadelphia Institute of Contemporary Art, Momenta Art, Smack Mellon, and La MaMa Galleria, among other venues. She has worked with artists such as Xu Bing, Jeffrey Gibson, Mary Mattingly, Mierle Laderman Ukeles, and Dread Scott.

== Publications ==
Reisman has edited and contributed to many publications derived from shows she has curated, including Elia Alba: The Supper Club, published in 2019 by Hirmer Verlag and Mobilizing Pedagogy: Two Social Practice Projects in the Americas by Pablo Helguera and Suzanne Lacy with Pilar Riaño-Alcalá, published by Amherst College Press the same year.
