= The 8th Floor =

Exhibit and event space in New York City

Coordinates: 40°44′19″N 73°59′35.5″W

The 8th Floor is an exhibition and event space established by Donald and Shelley Rubin in 2010. It is located at 17 West 17th Street in the Chelsea neighborhood of Manhattan, New York City, in the same building as the Rubin Museum. The space features a rotating selection of artists and exhibitions, many with a focus on social justice. In 2019 they launched a series of two-year exhibits under the theme Revolutionary Cycles.
