= Lobsang Pelden Tenpe Dronme =

Tibetan Buddhist tulku and lama (1890–1957)

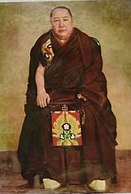

Personal life
- Born: 1890 Datong, Qinghai, China
- Died: 4 March 1957 (aged 66–67) Taipei, Taiwan

Religious life
- Religion: Tibetan Buddhism
- School: Gelug
- Lineage: Changkya Khutukhtu

Senior posting
- Predecessor: Changkya Lozang Tendzin Gyeltsen
- Successor: Changkya Tendzin Dönyö Yéshé Gyatso
- Reincarnation: Changkya Dragpa Öser

Lobsang Pelden Tenpe Dronme (Tibetan: ལྕང་སྐྱ་བློ་བཟང་དཔལ་ལྡན་བསྟན་པའི་སྒྲོན་མེ་, Wylie: lcang skya blo bzang dpal ldan bstan pa'i sgron me, Mongolian: Лувсанбалдандамбийдоми; Chinese: 羅桑般殿丹畢蓉梅; pinyin: Luósāng Bāndiàn Dānbì Róngméi; 1890 – 4 March 1957) was a Tibetan Buddhist tulku and lama who was the 7th Changkya Khutukhtu. He was the highest person of Tibetan Buddhism in Inner Mongolia and the fourth highest lamas of Tibetan Buddhism in general. He supported the Kuomintang and accompanied the Republic of China government to Taiwan after the Chinese Civil War in 1949. He was awarded titles by the Kuomintang and also received living expenses until his death. It is believed that before his death in 1957 he had signed a pledge that he would not reincarnate until the Republic of China retook the mainland.

After his death, his residence in Taipei was converted in February 1993 into the Mongolian and Tibetan Cultural Center, which includes a memorial to him.

== See also ==
- Mongolians in Taiwan
- Mongolian and Tibetan Cultural Center

Religious titles
Preceded by Changkya Lozang Tendzin Gyeltsen	Changkya Khutukhtu; 1891–1957	Vacant Title next held by Changkya Tendzin Dönyö Yéshé Gyatso
