= Leonard van der Kuijp =

Dutch Tibetologist (born 1952)

- Born: Leonard W. J. van der Kuijp; September 23, 1952 (age 73)
- Education: University of Hamburg
- Known for: Study of Tibetan Buddhist literature and history
- Scientific career
- Fields: Tibetology
- Workplaces: Harvard University
- Doctoral advisor: Lambert Schmithausen
- Notable students: Nathan W. Hill

Leonard W. J. van der Kuijp (Note: In this Dutch name, the surname is Van der Kuijp, not Kuijp.) (Chinese: 范德康; pinyin: Fàn Dékāng; born September 23, 1952) is a Dutch professor of Tibetan and Himalayan Studies and former chair of the Department of Sanskrit and Indian Studies (now the Department of South Asian Studies) at Harvard University.

Leonard van der Kuijp began his studies in mathematics, but then shifted his attention to Tibet. He received his master's degree at the University of Saskatchewan in Saskatoon, Canada, and his doctorate at the University of Hamburg in Germany.

In 1993 Van der Kuijp received the MacArthur Fellowship for "pioneering contributions to the study of Tibetan epistemology, biography and poetry." Van der Kuijp worked with the Nepal Research Center of the Humboldt University of Berlin and the University of Washington in Seattle. In July 1995 he joined the faculty at Harvard University. In 1999, he founded the Tibetan Buddhist Resource Center (TBRC), together with E. Gene Smith. Van der Kuijp was elected a foreign member of the Royal Netherlands Academy of Arts and Sciences in 2018.

Van der Kuijp focuses his research primarily on the Indo-Tibetan Buddhism, Tibetan Buddhist intellectual history, Tibetan Buddhism and the relations of Tibet to Mongolia and China.

He coauthored An Early Tibetan Survey of Buddhist Literature which was published as volume 64 of the Harvard Oriental Series in 2008.

== Journal publications ==
- "Phya pa Chos kyi seng ge's Impact on Tibetan Epistemological Theory." Journal of Indian Philosophy 5 (1978): 355-369.
- Contributions to the Development of Tibetan Buddhist Epistemology: From the Eleventh to the Thirteenth Century. Wiesbaden: Franz Steiner, 1983.
- "Studies in the Life and Thought of Mkhas grub rje I: Mkhas grub rje's Epistemological Oeuvre and His Philosophical Remarks on Dignaga's Pramanasamuccaya." Berliner Indologische Studien 1 (1985): 75-105.
- "On the Sources for Sa skya Paṇḍita's Notes on the Bsam yas Debate." The Journal of the International Association of Buddhist Studies 9.2 (1986): 147-153.
- "The Abbatial Succession of Gsang phu ne'u thog Monastery from ca.1073 to 1250. " Berliner Indologische Studien 3 (1987), 103-127.
- "Fourteenth Century Tibetan Cultural History 1: Ta'i-Si-Tu Byang-chub Rgyal-mtshan as a Man of Religion," Indo-Iranian Journal 37.2 (1994): 139-149.
- Review Article. "On The Lives of Śākyaśrībhadra (?-1225)." Journal of the American Oriental Society 114.4 (1994): 599-616.
- "Some Remarks on the Textual Transmission and Text of Bu ston Rin chen grub's Chos 'byung, a Chronicle of Buddhism in India and Tibet." Revue d'Études Tibétaines 25 (2013): 111-89.
