= Lisa Ross (photographer) =

American photographer

Lisa Ross is an American photographer known for her work exploring themes of cultural heritage and spirituality.

Her work has been exhibited in institutions such as the Rubin Museum of Art in New York City and the Fotografiska Museum in Stockholm. Ross’s exhibitions and projects have been reviewed by publications including The New York Times, Artforum, and The New Yorker. A monograph was published in conjunction with her 2013 solo exhibition at the Rubin Museum and received coverage in The New York Review of Books.
