= Buddhist Digital Resource Center =

American nonprofit organization

The Buddhist Digital Resource Center (BDRC), formerly Tibetan Buddhist Resource Center (TBRC), is a 501(c)(3) nonprofit organization dedicated to seeking out, preserving, organizing, and disseminating Buddhist literature. Using state-of-the art technology, the Buddhist Digital Resource Center is the leader in the field of digital preservation of Buddhist texts, working with local partners to provide free access for the global community.

The Buddhist Digital Resource Center is the largest online archive of Tibetan and Buddhist texts in the world, and provides open access to the body of literature via an online library, a mobile app, and hard drive distribution programs.

Founded in 1999 by E. Gene Smith with a group of Buddhist scholars, BDRC hosts a digital library of the largest collection of digitized Tibetan texts in the world. Current programs focus on the preservation of texts in Pali, Chinese, Sanskrit, and Tibetan. BDRC maintains the Buddhist Digital Archives (BUDA), an online resource of 30 million pages of scanned texts and 5 million etexts.

== History ==
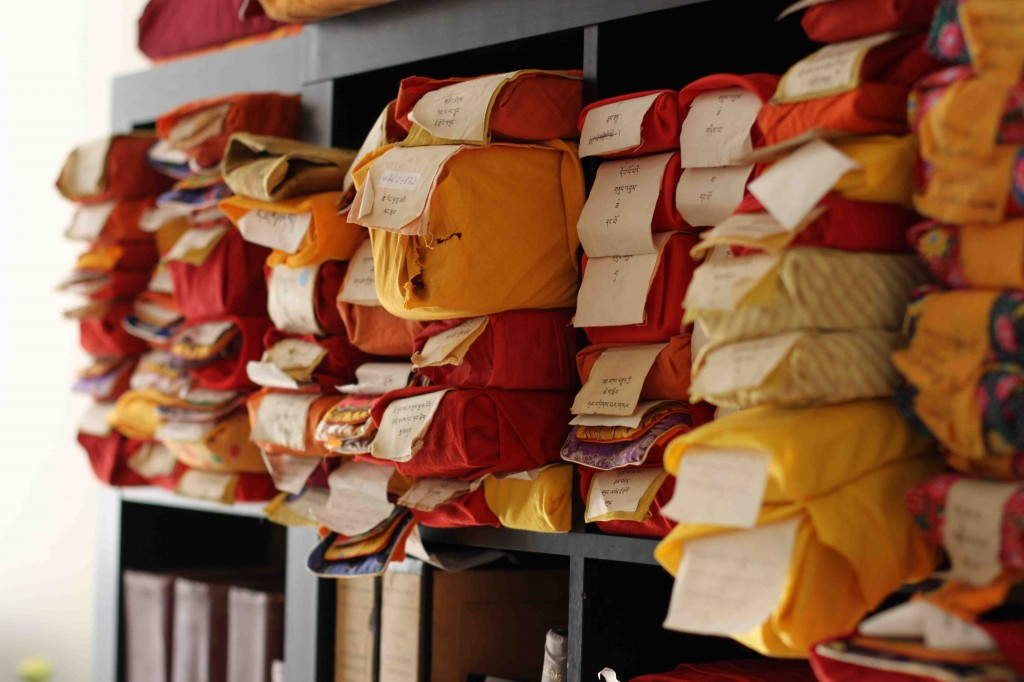
Traditional Tibetan Texts

In the early 1960s, while working on his PhD at the University of Washington, E. Gene Smith studied with the Venerable Dezhung Rinpoche. In 1964, Dezhung Rinpoche encouraged Smith to move to India in order to seek out and study Tibetan books more directly. He gave Smith letters of introduction to show to the lamas living among the Tibetan diaspora.

In 1968 the U.S. Library of Congress hired Smith as a field director in New Delhi where he worked on the Food for Peace humanitarian effort Public Law 480. Through the program, Smith began to copy and print thousands of Tibetan texts while keeping a version of each one for his own collection. He moved from India to Indonesia in 1985 and then Egypt, along with his collection of 12,000 volumes of texts.

In 1997 Smith retired from the Library of Congress and began working to implement his vision of making the preserved texts accessible using the new scanning and digitization technologies that were, at that time, just beginning to become available. In 1999 with friends including Tibetan translator Michele Martin and Harvard professor and fellow Tibetologist Leonard van der Kuijp, he founded the Tibetan Buddhist Resource Center (TBRC) in Cambridge, Massachusetts. Smith's texts from India that were digitized at TBRC became the foundation for Tibetan studies in the United States.

In 2002 with the support of Shelley and Donald Rubin, TBRC moved to New York City, where Smith became an advisor to the Rubin Museum of Art. Major grants from the Patricia and Peter Gruber Foundation, Khyentse Foundation, and the Shelley and Donald Rubin Foundation allowed TBRC to acquire a significant number of texts, develop its archiving system, and add more professional staff. Starting as technical director in 2001, Jeff Wallman was personally selected by Smith to be executive director and was appointed by the board of directors in 2009.

Gene Smith died on December 16, 2010. TBRC had scanned 7 million pages of Tibetan texts at the time of his death.

In 2015 TBRC's mission was expanded beyond Tibetan materials to include the preservation of texts from all Buddhist traditions, including Sanskrit, Pali and Chinese, in addition to Tibetan. To reflect this expansion, the organization was renamed the Buddhist Digital Resource Center (BDRC).

== BDRC's Work ==
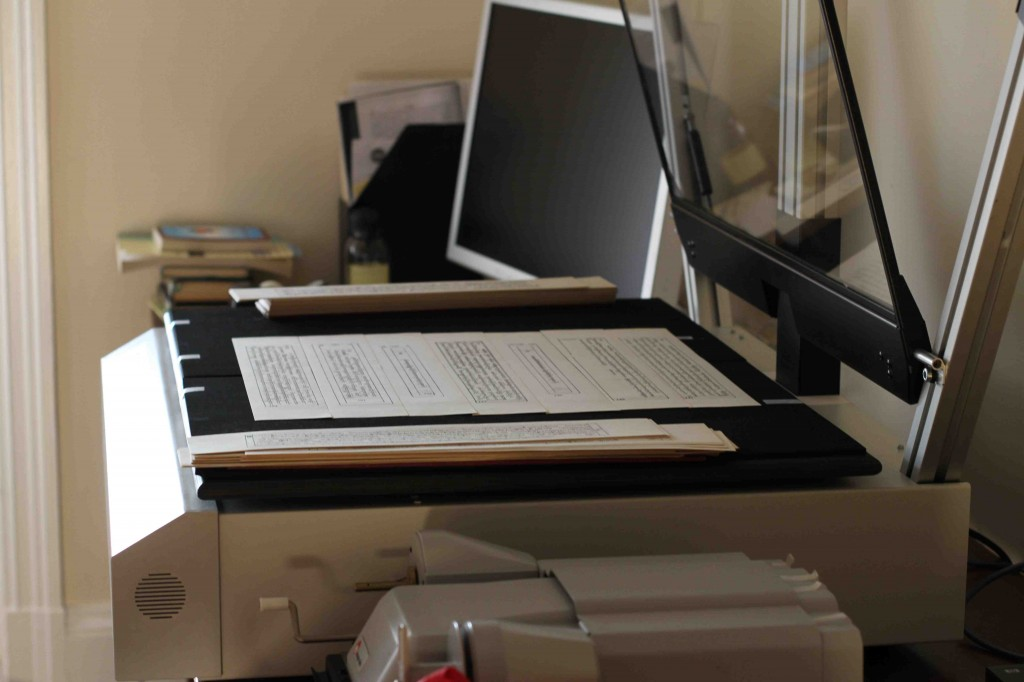
Tibetan texts on a planetary book scanner next to a microfilm scanner

BDRC seeks out and preserves undiscovered texts, organizes them into a library catalog system, and disseminates the library online and to remote locations on hard drives so anyone can read, print, or share the texts. Texts are cataloged by work, genre, subject, person, and place.

Currently, the collection contains more than 30 million pages of Buddhist texts scanned from the precious originals, as well as 5 million pages of etexts. Between 1,000,000 and 2,000,000 pages are added every year.

BDRC's work was recognized by the 17th Karmapa Ogyen Trinley Dorje in a letter offering his support, gratitude, and prayers. Gene Smith's life and TBRC were the subject of the 2012 documentary Digital Dharma, directed by Dafna Yachin of Lunchbox Communications. Variety film critic John Anderson described the film as, "A divinely inspired gift... also an affectionate tribute to the late E. Gene Smith, the scholar, librarian and ex-Mormon who waged a 50-year struggle to save the endangered texts of Tibetan Buddhism."

== 25th Anniversary ==
September 28, 2024, marked the 25th anniversary of the Buddhist Digital Resource Center. Since 1999, in partnership with local communities and our supporters, BDRC has digitally preserved Buddhist manuscripts, many of them rare or endangered.

As part of the anniversary celebrations, BDRC embarked on a project to digitize150 uncataloged and unscanned Tibetan texts collected by founder E. Gene Smith (1936-2010). Other notable milestones of this 25th Anniversary year include a major upgrade to the digital library site featuring improved search functionality and an enhanced etext environment (BUDA 2.0); the launch of a desktop app for Optical Character Recognition of Tibetan texts; and the online publication of 3.5 million pages of Buddhist scriptures.
