= Gönlung Jampa Ling monastery =

Gönlung Jampa Ling
- Tibetan transcription(s); Tibetan: དགོན་ལུང་བྱམས་པ་གླིང་། Wylie transliteration: dgon lung byams pa gling
- Location within China

Religion
- Affiliation: Tibetan Buddhism
- Sect: Gelug

Location
- Country: China
- Interactive map of Gönlung Jampa Ling
- Coordinates: 36°44′23.22″N 102°10′50.66″E

Architecture
- Founder: Gyeltse Donyo Chokyi Gyatso
- Established: 1604

Gönlung Jampa Ling (Tibetan: དགོན་ལུང་བྱམས་པ་གླིང་།, Wylie: dgon lung byams pa gling; Chinese: 佑宁寺, pinyin: Yòuníng Sì) is a Tibetan Buddhist monastery of Gelug sect in the Huzhu Tu Autonomous County of Qinghai province, China. The monastery was founded in 1604 by Gyeltse Donyo Chokyi Gyatso. Gönlung Jampa Ling housed the first Geluk seminary in Northeastern Tibet and was the seat if a number of important, high-ranking lamas including the Changkya and Thuken incarnation lineages.

Gonlung is one of four famous Tibetan monasteries (Chuzang, Serkhog, Jakhyung and Gonlung) in north-east Qinghai, earlier considered as a border area between Tibet and China.

In 1724 the monastery was destroyed by the Manchus during the suppression of Lhazang Khan (a Mongol Khoshut ruler, killed by Dzungars in 1717), but rebuilt in 1732.

== Gallery ==
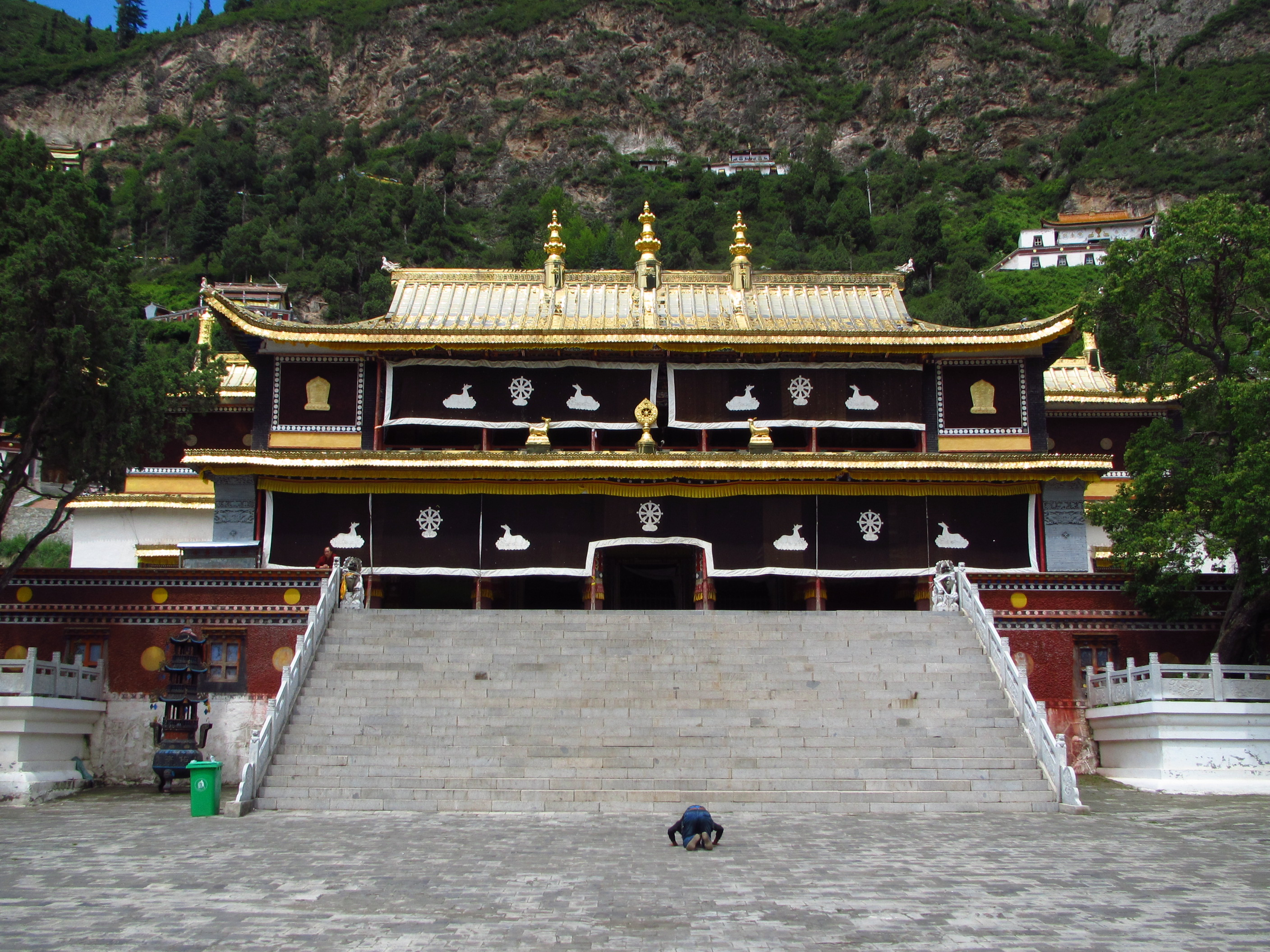
Front view of Gönlung Jampa Ling main temple

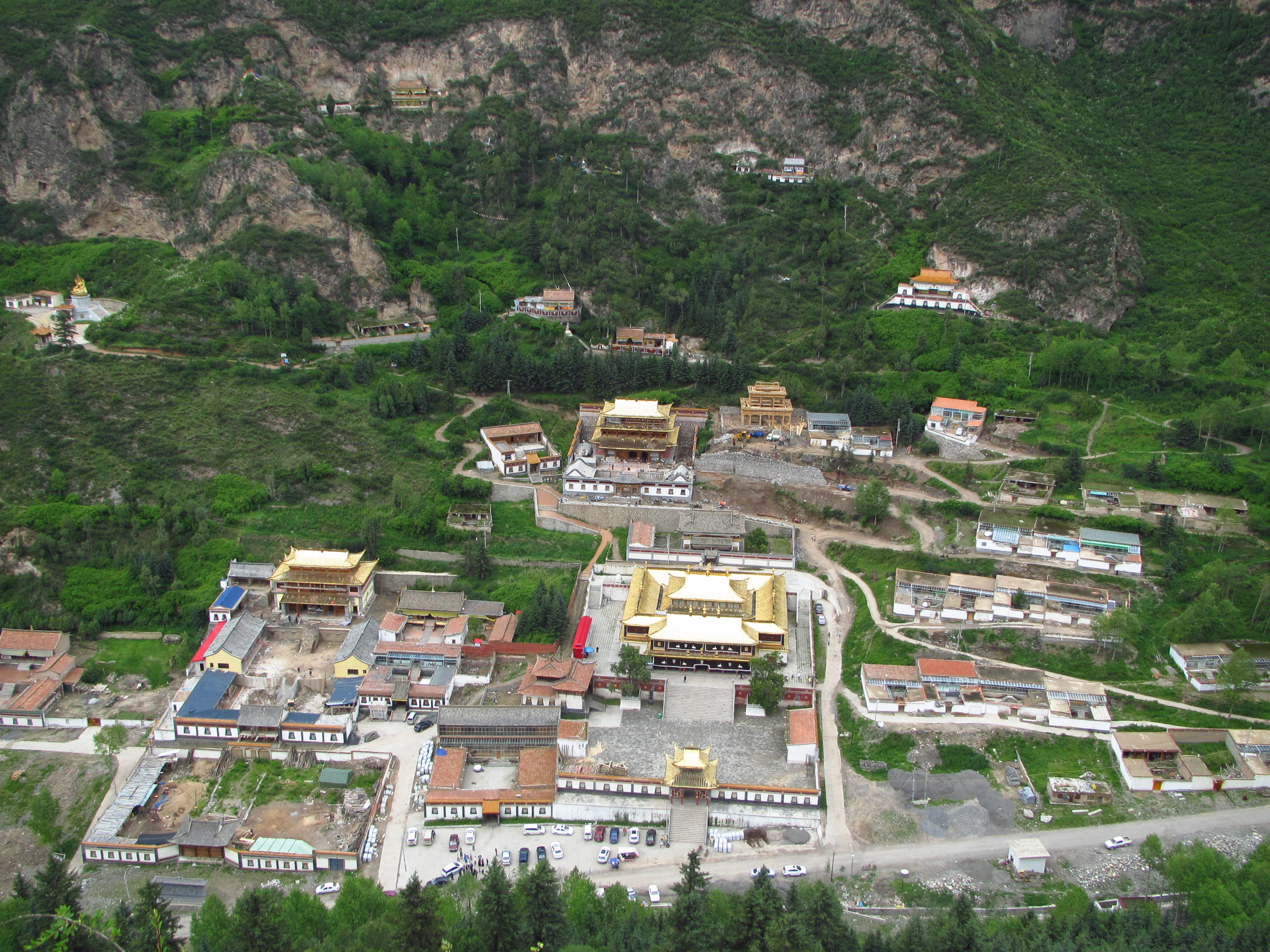
View of Gönlung Jampa Ling from above

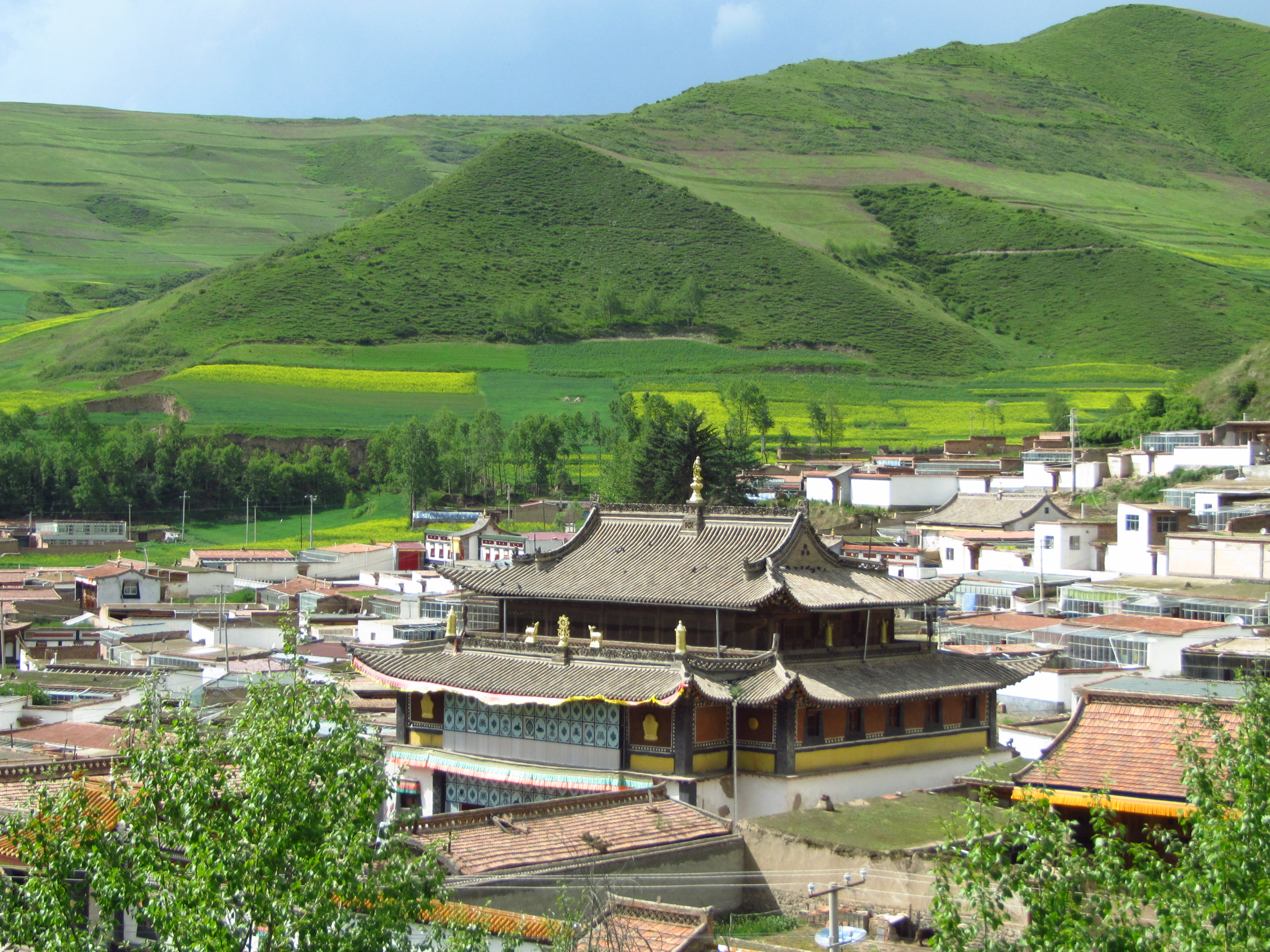
View of Gönlung Jampa Ling west temple from the east

== Sources ==
- Sullivan, Brenton (2013). The Mother of All Monasteries: Gönlung Jampa Ling and the Rise of Mega Monasteries in Northeastern Tibet (Ph.D.). University of Virginia.
