= E. Gene Smith =

- Born: August 10, 1936; Ogden, Utah, United States
- Died: December 16, 2010 (aged 74); New York City, New York, United States
- Citizenship: United States
- Education: University of Washington
- Scientific career
- Fields: Tibetology
- Workplaces: Tibetan Buddhist Resource Center

E. Gene Smith (August 10, 1936 – December 16, 2010) was a scholar of Tibetology, specifically Tibetan literature and history.

== Life and career ==
Ellis Gene Smith was born in Ogden, Utah to a traditional Mormon family. He studied at a variety of institutions of higher education in the U.S.: Adelphi College, Hobart College, University of Utah, and the University of Washington in Seattle.

In Seattle, he was able to study with Dezhung Rinpoche and members of the Sakya Phuntso Phodrang family who had been brought there under the auspices of the Rockefeller Foundation grant to the Far Eastern and Russian Institute. He studied Tibetan culture and Buddhism with Dezhung Rinpoche from 1960 to 1964 and spent the summer of 1962 traveling to the other Rockefeller centers in Europe to meet with other Tibetan savants.

In 1964 he completed his Ph.D. qualifying exams and traveled to Leiden for advanced studies in Sanskrit and Pali. In 1965 he went to India under a Foreign Area Fellowship Program (Ford Foundation) grant to study with living exponents of all of the Tibetan Buddhist and Bönpo traditions.

He began his studies with Geshe Lobsang Lungtok (Ganden Changtse), Drukpa Thoosay Rinpoche and Khenpo Noryang, and Dilgo Khyentse Rinpoche. He decided to remain in India to continue serious studies of Tibetan Buddhism and culture. He traveled extensively in the borderlands of India and Nepal. In 1968 he joined the Library of Congress New Delhi Field Office. He then began a project which was to last over the next two and a half decades, the reprinting of the Tibetan books which had been brought by the exile community or were with members of the Tibetan-speaking communities in Sikkim, Bhutan, India, and Nepal.

He became field director of the Library of Congress Field Office in India in 1980 and served there until 1985 when he was transferred to Indonesia. He stayed in Jakarta running the Southeast Asian programs until 1994 when he was assigned to the Library of Congress Middle Eastern Office in Cairo.

In 1997 he retired from the Library of Congress. He briefly worked as a consultant for Trace Foundation for the establishment of the Himalayan and Inner Asian Resources in New York, an organisation dedicated to the preservation and dissemination of Tibetan literature.

In 1999, Smith founded the Tibetan Buddhist Resource Center (TBRC), together with Leonard van der Kuijp of Harvard University and friends to digitize the 12,000 volume corpus of Tibetan literature. This digital library is the largest collection of Tibetan literature outside of Tibet. In 2015 TBRC's mission was expanded beyond Tibetan materials to include the preservation of texts from all Buddhist traditions, and the organization was renamed the Buddhist Digital Resource Center (BDRC). BDRC continues to acquire, preserve, organize, and make available Buddhist texts, and maintains the Buddhist Digital Archives (BUDA), an online resource of 30 million pages of scanned texts and 5 million etexts.

In 2001, Wisdom Publications published Among Tibetan Texts, a collection of essays that Smith wrote in Delhi as introductions to Library of Congress reprints of Tibetan texts. These materials had circulated since the early 1980s amongst students and researchers, and had acquired a sort of cult status. A chapter is also devoted to Smith in David Jackson's biography of Dezhung Rinpoche, "A Saint in Seattle."

He is the subject of the award-winning documentary Digital Dharma. Variety called the film "an affectionate tribute to the late E. Gene Smith, the scholar, librarian and ex-Mormon who waged a 50-year struggle to save the endangered texts of Tibetan Buddhism." It received a theatrical release and was invited to qualify for Academy Award consideration by the International Documentary Association through the 2012 DocuWeeks program.

== Publications ==
- Ellis Gene Smith (2001). Among Tibetan Texts: History and Literature of the Himalayan Plateau. Wisdom Publications Inc. ISBN 978-0-86171-179-6.

== Sources ==
- Schaeffer, Kurtis R. Introduction p. 1-9 in E. Gene Smith, Among Tibetan Texts, Wisdom Publications, 2001.
- Obituary in the Washington Post
