= Shelley and Donald Rubin Foundation =

American private foundation

The Shelley and Donald Rubin Foundation is a New York City based foundation focusing on art, social justice and civic life in New York City and the Himalayas. It was established in 1995 with Evelyn Rich as the first Executive Director. Following her 2004 departure, she was succeeded by Bruce Payne (2004-2013), Alexander Gardner (2013-2016) and Sara Reisman (2016-2021).

The Rubins are art collectors whose primary projects are The 8th Floor and the Rubin Museum of Himalayan Art, both located within a building owned by Donald Rubin in the Chelsea neighborhood of Manhattan. They launched an Art and Social justice grant program in 2015 following Sara Reisman's hiring. Among their other initiatives is a Queens College masters program called SPQ that focuses on social justice in the practice of art.
