= Rubin Museum of Himalayan Art =

Museum in Manhattan, New York

Rubin Museum of Art

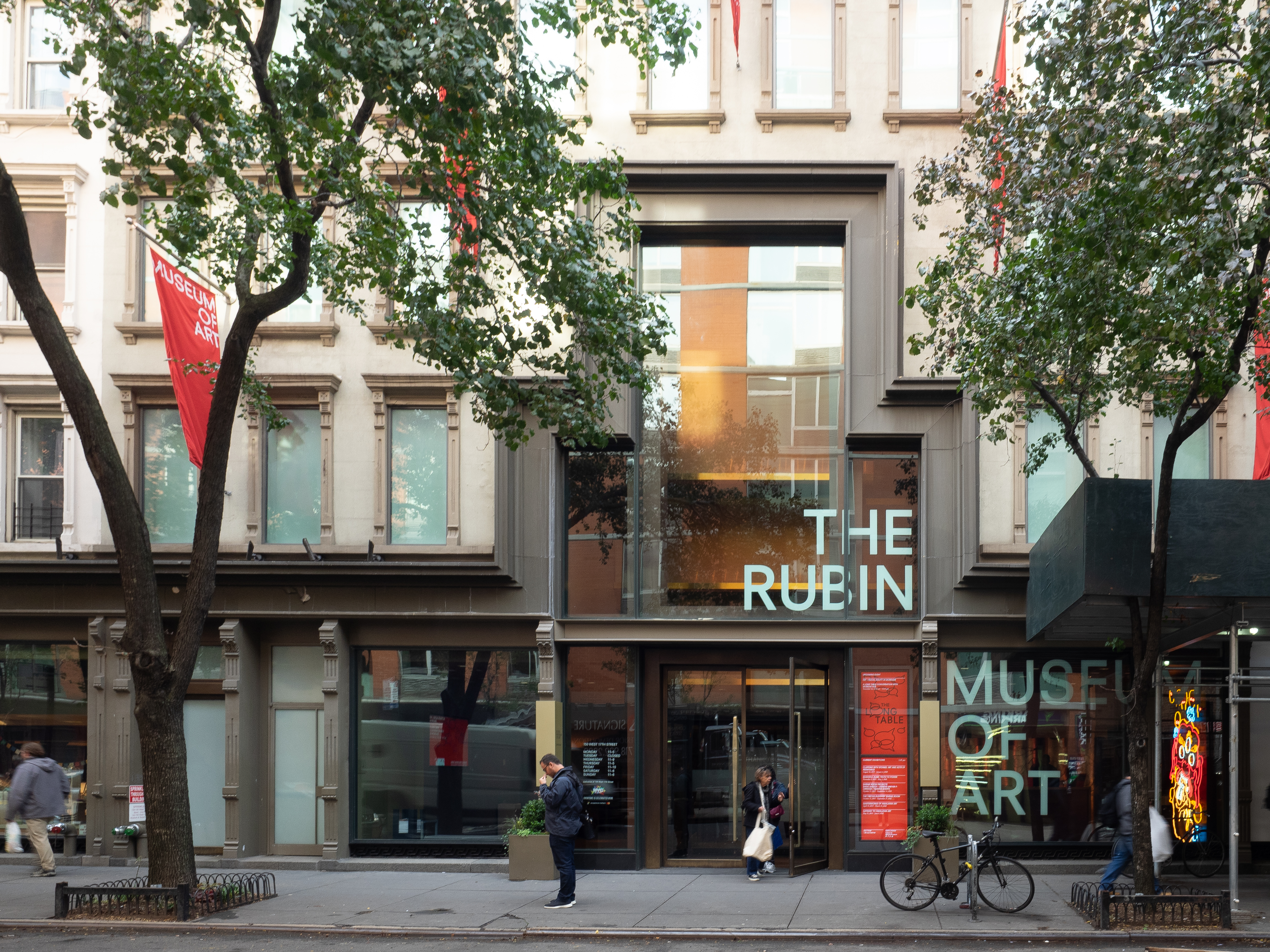
- Exterior seen from 17th Street
- Established: October 2, 2004
- Location: 150 West 17th Street; Manhattan, New York City
- Coordinates: 40.7401°N 73.9978°W
- Type: Art museum, education center, performance and event venue
- Collection size: 2,000+ objects
- Public transit access: Bus: M1, M2, M3, M7, M14A, M14D, M20, M55 PATH: JSQ-33, HOB-33 at 14th Street; Subway: at 14th Street/Eighth Avenue; at 14th Street–Union Square; at 14th Street/Sixth Avenue; at 18th Street
- Website: rubinmuseum.org

The Rubin Museum of Himalayan Art, also known as the Rubin Museum or the Rubin Museum of Art, is dedicated to the collection, display, and preservation of the art and cultures of the Himalayas, the Indian subcontinent, Central Asia and other regions within Eurasia, with a permanent collection focused particularly on Tibetan art. The museum opened in 2004 at 150 West 17th Street between the Avenue of the Americas (Sixth Avenue) and Seventh Avenue in the Chelsea neighborhood of Manhattan in New York City. In early 2024 it announced the closure of its New York City building in order to become a global "museum without walls", focusing on traveling exhibitions, long-term loans, partnerships, and digital resources. The museum closed on October 6, 2024.

== History ==
The museum originated from a private collection of Himalayan art which Donald and Shelley Rubin had been assembling since 1974 and which they wanted to display. In 1998, the Rubins paid $22 million for the building that had been occupied by Barneys New York, a designer fashion department store that had filed for bankruptcy. The building was remodeled as a museum by preservation architects Beyer Blinder Belle. The original six-story spiral staircase was left intact to become the center of the 25,000 square feet (2,300 square meters) of exhibition space.

The museum opened on October 2, 2004, and displays more than 1,000 objects including paintings, sculpture, and textiles, as well as ritual objects from the 2nd to the 20th centuries. The new facade on 17th Street and the five floors of galleries were influenced by Tibetan art, and were conceived by New York-based museum architects Celia Imrey and Tim Culbert. Its graphic identity was conceived by graphic designer Milton Glaser.

Due to budgetary cuts, in 2019 the Rubin Museum fired one-quarter of its employees, reduced its operating hours, and reduced the number of special exhibitions it hosted every year. The COVID-19 pandemic in New York City further impacted the museum's finances negatively. In early 2024, media sources reported that the Rubin Museum's Manhattan location would close on October 6, 2024. The Rubin Museum would continue to operate without a physical location, loaning out pieces to other institutions while continuing its support and research of Himalayan art around the world.

== Funding ==
In 2011, the museum announced that founders Donald and Shelley Rubin would give a five-year, $25 million gift to support operations, exhibitions, and programs. Donald Rubin also planned to step down as chief executive, although the couple were to continue to lead the museum's board. This presented challenges and led to a restructuring ahead of the funds running out in 2020.

== Building ==
The 70,000-square-foot (6,500-square-meter) museum occupied what was formerly a portion of the Barneys department store in Manhattan's Chelsea neighborhood. It was acquired in 1998 and renovated extensively from 2000 to 2004. The renovation and new design elements were the results of a collaboration headed by the architectural firm of Beyer Blinder Belle and including Atelier Imrey Culbert (associate museum designers) and Milton Glaser Incorporated. Many of the architectural details within the building were retained, most notably Andree Putman's steel-and-marble staircase that spirals through the six-story gallery tower. In addition to gallery space for featured exhibitions, the museum includes space for contemporary and historical photography, an art-making studio, a theater for multimedia events and performances, a café, and a gift shop. In September 2011, the museum opened a new 5,000-square-foot (460-square-meter) Education Center adjacent to the main museum building. The building is also home to the Rubin's other art project, The 8th Floor, which opened in 2010.

== Exhibitions ==
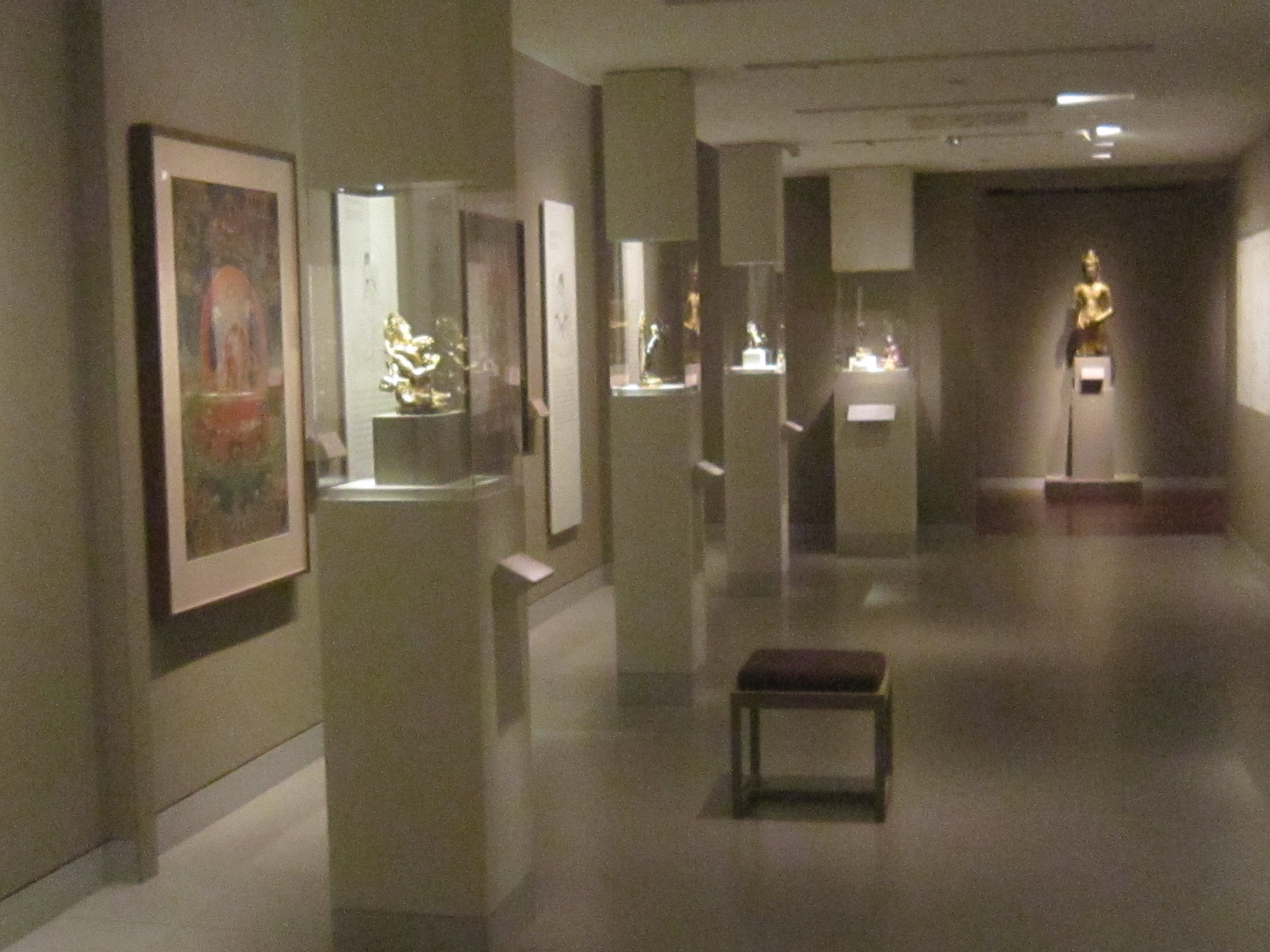
The second-floor gallery with objects from the permanent collection

Among the museum's inaugural exhibitions were "Methods of Transcendence", "Portraits of Transmission" and "The Demonic Divine in Himalayan Art". In 2006, a three-part exhibition called "Holy Madness" spotlighted Siddhas with "Portraits of Tantric Siddhas," "Mahasiddhas at Gyantse," and "Mahasiddhas at Alchi."

The Rubin Museum of Art has hosted numerous exhibitions that explore the intersection of art, spirituality, and cultural heritage, with a focus on the Himalayan and Central Asian regions. One notable exhibition was Living Shrines of Uyghur China, a photography project by American photographer Lisa Ross. This series, which was on display in 2013, documented sacred sites of the Uyghur people in the Xinjiang region and highlighted themes of cultural resilience and spirituality.

After a shift in the volume of rotating exhibits in 2019 due to funding challenges, the museum began to focus more on experiences and the permanent collection. In September 2021, the museum opened a new permanent installation, called Mandala Lab dedicated to emotional health and wellness.

In addition to its exhibits, the museum was also known for its wide-ranging public programming series.

== Gallery ==
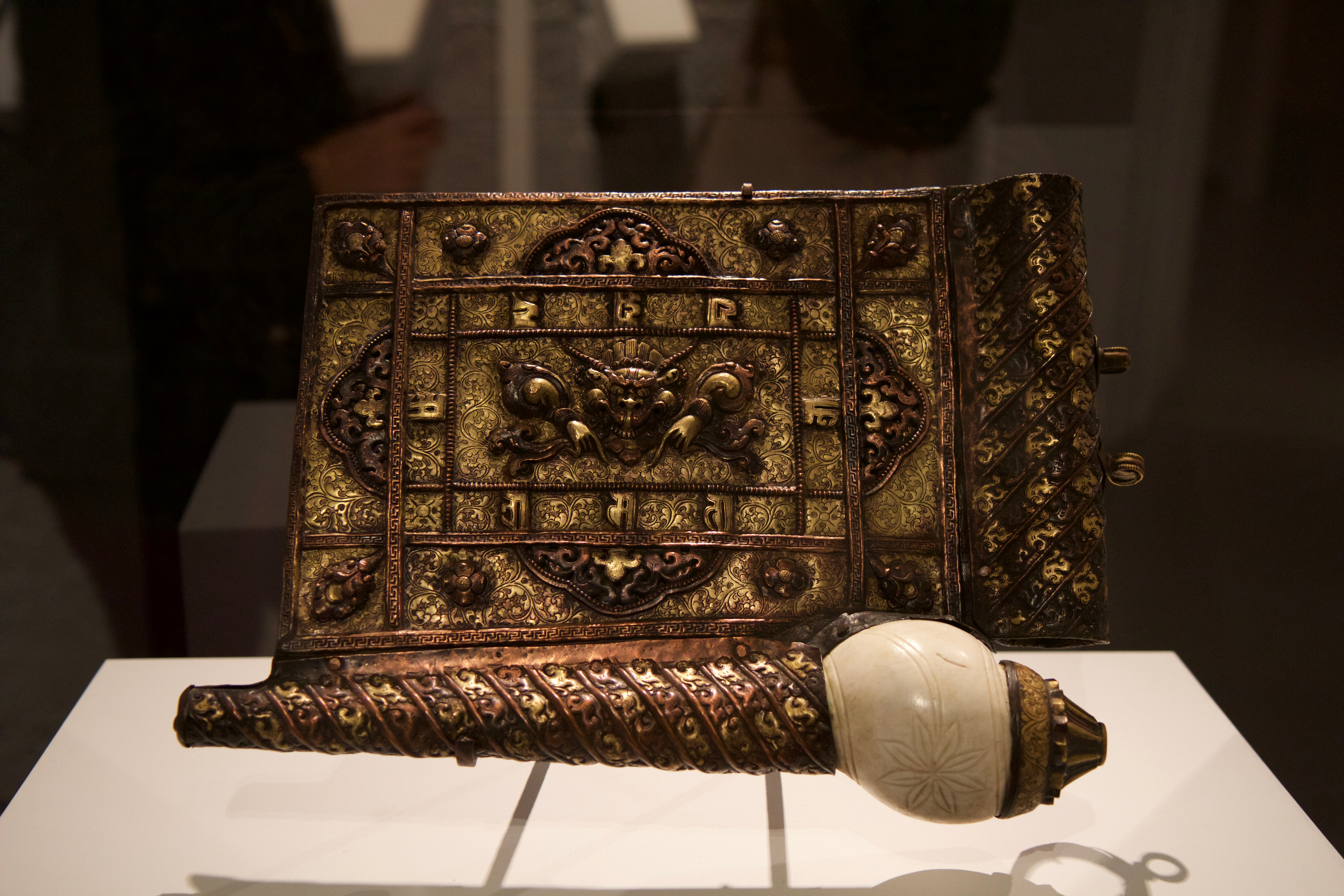
Artifact at the Rubin Museum of Himalayan Art

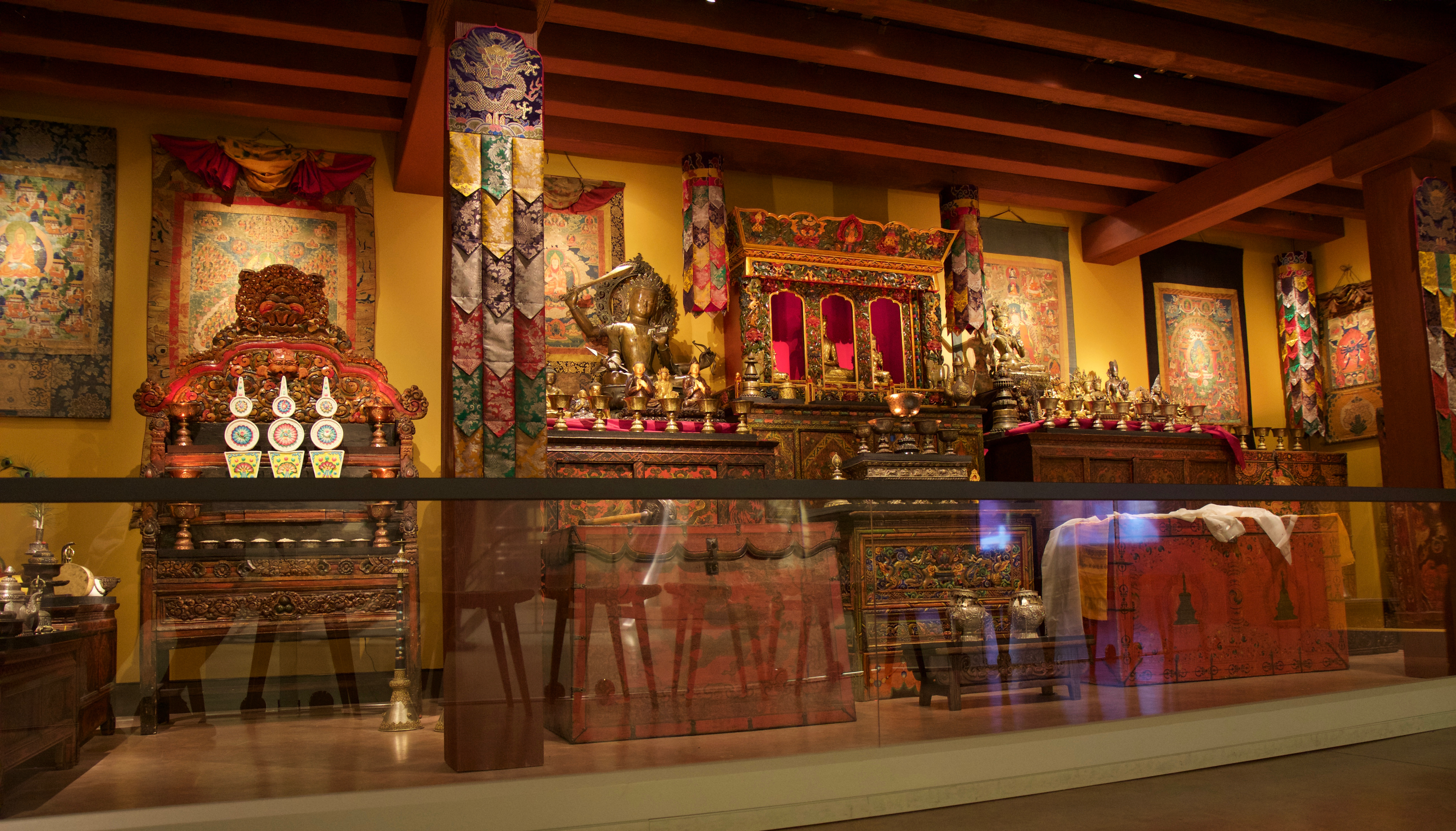
Shrine at the Rubin Museum of Himalayan Art

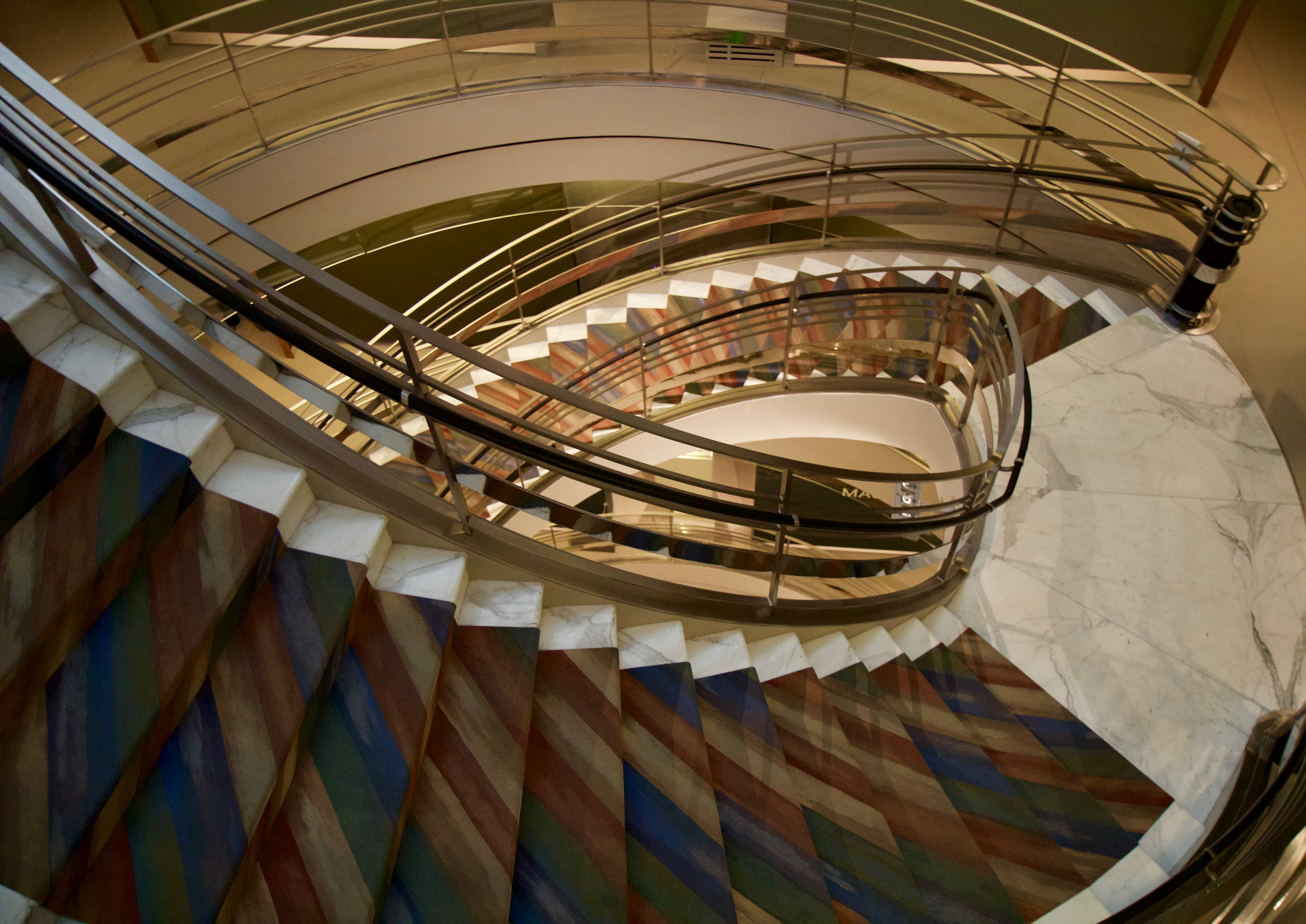
Elliptical stairs at the Rubin Museum of Himalayan Art

== See also ==
- Culture of New York City
- List of museums and cultural institutions in New York City
