= Changkya Khutukhtu =

The Changkya Khutukhtu (Chakhar Mongolian: Janggiy-a qutuγ-tu, Khalkha Mongolian: Жанжаа хутагт Janjaa Khutagt; Tibetan: ལྕང་སྐྱ་ཧོ་ཐོག་ཐུ།, lcang-skya ho-thog-thu; Chinese: 章嘉呼圖克圖, Zhāngjiā Hūtúkètú) was the title held by the spiritual head of the Gelug lineage of Tibetan Buddhism in Inner Mongolia during the Qing dynasty.

The most important lama of this series was the Third Changkya, Rolpai Dorje, who was preceptor to the Qianlong emperor of China, and chief representative of Tibetan Buddhism at the Qing court. He and his successors, mostly based in Beijing, were considered to be the senior Tibetan lamas in China proper and Inner Mongolia. The Seventh Changkya accompanied the Nationalist government to Taiwan in 1949 and died there in 1957.

== List of lCang-skya Khutukhtu ==
Note: In some enumerations, the second Changkya, Ngawang Losang Chöden is counted as the first, the third Rölpé Dorjé as the second, and so on.

1. 1607-1641: Changkya Dragpa Öser (lcang skya grags pa 'od zer)
2. 1642-1714: Changkya Ngawang Losang Chöden (lcang skya ngag dbang bLo bzang chos ldan)
3. 1717-1786: Changkya Rölpé Dorjé (lcang skya rol pa'i rdo rje),
4. 1787-1846: Changkya Yéshé Tenpé Gyeltsen (lcang skya ye shes bstan pa'i rgyal mtshan)
5. 1849-1875: Changkya Yéshé Tenpé Nyima (lcang skya ye shes bstan pa'i nyi ma),
6. 1878-1888: Changkya Lozang Tendzin Gyeltsen (lcang skya blo bzang bstan 'dzin rgyal mtshan),
7. 1891-1957: Changkya Lozang Penden Tenpé Drönmé (lcang skya blo bzang dpal ldan bstan pa'i sgron me),
8. 1980- : Changkya Tendzin Dönyö Yéshé Gyatso (bstan 'dzin don yod ye shes rgya mtsho),

The previous lCang-skya Khutukhtu, named Lozang Penden Tenpé Drönmé, went to Taiwan in 1949. It has been reported that before his death in 1957 he had signed a pledge that he would not reincarnate until the Republic of China retook the mainland. However, the Dalai Lama recognised the current incarnation on 11 August 1998. He was born in 1980 in Tsongkha region, was ordained at an early age and came to India as a refugee in 1998. He is now residing in the re-established Drepung Monastery, in India. Neither he nor two other claimants to be the current Changkya are recognised by either Taipei or Beijing.

== See also ==
- Changkya Rölpé Dorjé
- Gönlung Jampa Ling monastery
- Mongolian and Tibetan Cultural Center
