= New Kadampa Tradition =

Buddhist new religious movement founded in 1991

New Kadampa Tradition International Kadampa Buddhist Union
- Abbreviation: NKT-IKBU
- Formation: 1991
- Founder: Kelsang Gyatso
- Type: Tibetan Buddhism (disputed); Buddhist new religious movement Western Buddhism; Dorje Shugden
- Headquarters: Manjushri Kadampa Meditation Centre (Conishead Priory); Ulverston, Cumbria; LA12 9QQ; United Kingdom
- Spiritual Director: Gen-la Kelsang Jampa
- Website: kadampa.org

The New Kadampa Tradition – International Kadampa Buddhist Union (NKT—IKBU) is a global Buddhist organisation founded by Kelsang Gyatso in England in 1991. It is registered in England as a charitable, or non-profit, company. It has expanded rapidly since its founding, and as of September 2026 it claims "nearly 1000 centres and groups in nearly 40 countries."

The NKT-IKBU teaches a form of Gelug Buddhism which it says is inspired and guided by "the ancient Kadampa Buddhist Masters and their teachings", as presented by its founder, Tibetan-born Kelsang Gyatso. with the objective of making Buddhist meditation and teaching more readily accessible in modern daily life. Academic studies note that the tradition claims to maintain an unbroken lineage by basing its study programs and practices exclusively on the works of Kelsang Gyatso. Scholars of Buddhism and sociologists of religion generally classify the Tradition as a new religious movement, noting it is independent from established Tibetan institutional hierarchies, although its teachings are generally in line with Gelug Buddhism.

== History ==
The origins of the New Kadampa Tradition can be traced back to the establishment of a network of centres by students under the direction of Lama Thubten Yeshe and Thubten Zopa Rinpoche. In 1976, students under the direction of Lama Yeshe purchased Conishead Priory in Ulverston, England, legally establishing it as a Charitable Trust called Manjushri Institute. The following year after accepting an invitation form Lama Yeshe to be its resident teacher, Kelsang Gyatso arrived at the institute. In 1978, he also established Mahayamaka Center in York under his own spiritual direction.

Over the next decade administrative and structural disagreements developed between the leadership of the FPMT and the Managers of the Institute as local members grew dissatisfied with the centralised authority of the FPMT. In October 1985 a revised charity constitution was adopted for the Institute after mediation efforts from the office of the Dalai Lama. This resulted in the appointment of new trustees split between both parties

Between 1987–1990, Kelsang Gyatso engaged in a meditation retreat in Scotland, during which time he wrote several books and developed new study programs. After completing his retreat, in April 1991 he announced the formation of the New Kadampa Tradition as an independent organisation, and invited the centers he had established to join. In 1992, Manjushri Mahayana Buddhist Center was legally incorporated as a registered Charity (Note: Charity Commission for England and Wales records (Charity No. 1012749))separate from the FPMT.

== Teachings and Practice ==
All teachings and practices within the New Kadampa Tradition are based on the written and oral teachings and guidance of Kelsang Gyatso. The original texts are prepared in English and then translated into multiple languages and published by Tharpa Publications. The books and practice texts, such as sadhanas, draw from the Gelug Tradition of Tibetan Buddhism, in particular the works of its founder, Je Tsongkhapa. The emphasis is on a Madhyamaka Prasangika philosophical orientation, with a focus on dependent arising, emptiness, and fundamental Mahayana teachings on Bodhichitta, Karma, and Stages of the Path to Enlightenment (Lamrim).

The New Kadampa Tradition maintains that its texts, curriculum, and transmission are a direct preservation of Je Tsongkhapa’s tradition. Religious scholars such as Bluck see an "apparent contradiction" between claiming a pure Tibetan lineage and complete separation from contemporary Tibetan religion, culture and politics," and describe the NKT’s isolation from contemporary Tibetan institutions as insular or sectarian. The NKT itself maintains that the approach preserves their lineage in its pure form while being an effective adaptation for modern practitioners whose commitments include maintaining "a deep respect" for all Dharma teachings and other Buddhist traditions and that "the Kagyupas as well as the Nyingmapas and the Sakyapas" also have "a complete path to enlightenment".

=== Guru Yoga and Protector Practice ===
NKT-IKBU meditation practices include traditional Lamrim subjects such as the preciousness of human life, death, rebirth, samsara, kindness, compassion, equanimity, and the role of the guru in Buddhism. Chanted prayers follow a traditional Tibetan format, including going for refuge, generating bodhicitta and the four immeasurables, imagining the Buddhas and bodhisattvas as physically present, asking for and receiving blessings, the transfer of merit, and so on.

The primary daily practice of the NKT is the Ganden Lhagyama (Guru Yoga of Je Tsongkhapa) in conjunction with prayers to the Dharma Protector Dorje Shugden. Described by the group as "the essential practices of the New Kadampa Tradition of Mahayana Buddhism", this combination of guru yoga and protector practice is not unusual in Tibetan Buddhism, where it functions to create the conditions for successful practice, including receiving blessings, accumulating merit, purifying negativity, and removing obstacles to the spiritual path. However, the specific reliance on Dorje Shugden as the protector has been the source of wider controversy and disagreement.

Other ritual practices recited daily, weekly, or monthly include prayers to Avalokiteshvara, Heruka, Vajrayogini, Tara, Manjushri, Amitayus, and the Medicine Buddha, all of which follow the traditional format but are recited in the local language and not in Tibetan.

==== Dorje Shugden Practice and International Controversy ====
While the practice of Dorje Shugden was widespread within the Gelug School of Tibetan Buddhism and its Western manifestations such as the FPMT during the 20th century, being taught by Trijang Rinpoche and transmitted to Western students by such senior Lamas as Song Rinpoche during the 1970s and 1980s, it became controversial in the mid-1990s.

In 1995 and 1996, the 14th Dalai Lama denounced the practice in public talks and statements, calling it sectarian and harmful to both his life and the Tibetan cause. In response, the Tibetan Government-in-Exile and major monastic centers implemented restrictions forcing Shugden practitioners to choose between abandoning their practice or being excluded from positions within exile institutions, monasteries, and groups.

Kelsang Gyatso acted publicly to oppose these measures, arguing he was responding to requests for help by practitioners within the exiled Tibetan community. His public opposition and refusal to cease the practice led to his formal expulsion from Sera Je Monastery in 1996, cementing a complete break with the mainstream Tibetan leadership and preceding international public demonstrations over religious freedom organized by practitioners, many of whom were his students.

=== Study Programs ===
NKT-IKBU offers three study programs: an introductory General Programme, a more advanced Foundation Programme, and a Teacher Training Programme. It is believed by NKT-IKBU followers that the teachings transmit the pure lineage of Je Tsongkhapa in its entirety.

The General Program (GP) provides an introduction to basic Buddhist ideas and meditation. Cozort explains that GP classes are "simply the ongoing general instructure for all comers at NKT Centers or wherever NKT teachers find a venue for teaching." The Foundation Program (FP) includes the study of six commentaries written by Kelsang Gyatso on several classical texts. The Teacher Training Program (TTP) is intended for people who wish to train as NKT-IKBU Dharma Teachers who, in turn, will teach Buddhism to newcomers as well as serve as tantric gurus.All resident teachers of NKT-IKBU centres follow this program of study and practice. It involves the study of 14 texts by Kelsang Gyatso, including all of those in the Foundation Program. This program also includes commitments concerning one's lifestyle, based on the five lay vows of the Pratimoksha, and the completion of specific meditation retreats. There is also a "teaching skills" class every month.

=== Teachers and Leadership Structure ===
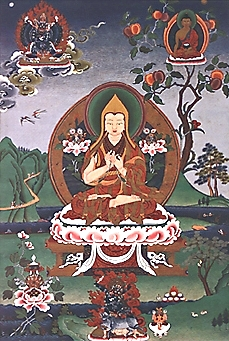
Je Tsongkhapa (Tsong-kha-pa), founder of the Gelug school, in the fifth vision of Khedrub Jey (Mkhas-'grub)

The NKT-IKBU traces its spiritual lineage from Shakyamuni through Tsongkhapa, Pabongkhapa Déchen Nyingpo, Lobsang Yeshe Tenzin Gyatso, and Kelsang Gyatso.

The NKT is led by the General Spiritual Director (currently Gen-la Kelsang Jampa) and Deputy Spiritual Director. Their responsibilities include leading the 3 international festivals each year and granting ordination. Each country and region also has National and Regional Spiritual directors and each center has a Resident teacher. The tradition is notable amongst Buddhist traditions for having a significant number of female and lay practitioners Senior roles.

== Religious Observances and Festivals ==
=== International Festivals ===
Three annual International Buddhist NKT Festivals are held each year: the Spring Festival (six days) and the Summer Festival (two weeks), both of which are typically held at Manjushri KMC in the UK, and the Fall Festival (six days), which is held at various locations outside the UK. Taught by the General and Deputy Spiritual Directors of the NKT, these large gatherings of international students are viewed as the primary institutional framework for maintaining continuity across its network of centers from generation to generation.

=== Religious Observances and Festivals ===
The NKT marks many of the traditional Buddhist religious days such as Buddha's Enlightenment Day, Turning the Wheel of Dharma Day (which also marks Kelsang Gyatso's birthday), and Je Tsongkhapa Day alongside monthly practices like Tara Day, Tsog, and Protector Day (Dorje Shugden), however, unlike traditional Tibetan Buddhism, the dates follow the Gregorian calendar and not the lunar calendar. Other important dates include the annual NKT Day (commemorating the founding of the movement) and International Temples Day (celebrating global temple building).

=== Ordination ===
The NKT-IKBU reports that it has over 700 monks and nuns. Ordination ceremonies are usually held twice a year in the main NKT Temple at Manjushri Kadampa Meditation Center in Cumbria (UK), Ulverston. To ordain, one must ask Kelsang Gyatso's permission, and also the permission of his or her parents.

Buddha established both lay and ordained Pratimoksha vows, and established several levels of ordination vows. However, in the NKT-IKBU, Kelsang Gyatso established a simplified alternative tradition of ordination with ten vows that summarise the Vinaya, and a single ordination ceremony.

The NKT is unusual in having only 10 ordination vows, which are identical for both nuns and monks:

1. abandon killing
2. abandon stealing
3. abandon sexual activity
4. abandon lying and cheating
5. abandon taking intoxicants
6. practice contentment
7. reduce one's desire for worldly pleasures
8. abandon engaging in meaningless activities
9. maintain the commitments of refuge
10. practise the three trainings of pure moral discipline, concentration, and wisdom

In The Ordination Handbook, Kelsang Gyatso described these vows as being easier to integrate into today's society, saying:

The verbal explanation of the Kadampa ordination is brief – there are just ten commitments – but their practice is very extensive. These ten commitments that you promise to keep are the condensation of the entire lamrim teachings. Although we can finish a verbal explanation of these vows in a few hours, their practice is all-embracing. You should do like this – saying few words but always practising extensively.

He also says:

Western people are well educated; they do not have blind faith but immediately question and try to understand the truth. I cannot pretend with you. We cannot be like a fully ordained monk who has taken 253 vows, but who is not even keeping one. We should never do like this; we need to do everything correctly and purely. The Kadampa ordination solves all these problems. Practically speaking, all the 253 vows explained in the Vinaya Sutra are included within the ten commitments.

The ordination tradition of the NKT-IKBU is based on the Mahayana Perfection of Wisdom Sutras. Kelsang Gyatso says that when a person is first ordained they receive a Rabjung (preliminary) ordination; when their renunciation improves and deepens, their ordination naturally transforms into a Getsul (sramanera) ordination; and when their renunciation becomes "a spontaneous wish to attain nirvana", their ordination naturally transforms into a Gelong (bhikkhu) ordination. For this reason, Kelsang Gyatso did not require a separate ritual ordination ceremony.

Monks and nuns in the NKT-IKBU abandon the physical signs of a lay person by shaving their head and wearing the maroon and yellow robes of an ordained person. They are given a new name which starts with "Kelsang", since it is traditional for ordinees to receive part of the ordaining master's name (up until his death, this was Kelsang Gyatso). They also engage in a Sojong ceremony twice a month to purify and restore their vows.

Monastics who break their ordination vows must leave their Centre for a year, with the exception of attending various bigger courses, Celebrations and Festivals. After that year, "with some conditions" they can return but cannot teach or participate in the Teacher Training Program.

Practitioners who wish to ordain approach their Buddhist teacher when they feel ready, and request formal permission once they have their teacher's consent. They may decide to live in one of the NKT-IKBU's many Buddhist centres, but this is not a requirement. They are, in general, not financially provided for by the NKT-IKBU, and many are encouraged to seek unemployment benefits. If they live in an NKT-IKBU Dharma centre, they still have to pay rent for their accommodation and pay for meals and the spiritual programs. To finance this, some have part-time or full-time work. According to Belither, "a few people are sponsored because of their NKT work but others are on 'extended working visits' or work locally, and some are legitimately on employment benefit." When working, they may wear ordinary clothes if more convenient, and typically change out of robes to attend benefits appointments.

== Organisation ==
=== The Internal Rules ===
The governing document for the NKT is called A Moral Discipline Guide—The Internal Rules of the New Kadampa Tradition ~ International Kadampa Buddhist Union. Section 1 of The Internal Rules is a legally binding document, approved by the UK Charity Commission in 2020. The Internal Rules define the NKT-IKBU as the coalition of international study and meditation centres that follow Geshe Kelsang Gyatso's "pure tradition", his three study programmes, and The Internal Rules themselves.

=== Dharma centres ===
The NKT-IKBU currently lists more than 200 centres and around 900 branch classes/study groups in 40 countries, and reports having an estimated 8,000 members. Each centre is an independent charitable corporation; smaller groups branch off the centres and meet weekly in places such as churches and community centres. New Dharma centres are expected to be self-supporting, as neither Kelsang Gyatso nor the NKT-IKBU owns the centres.

A Kadampa Meditation Centre (KMC) serves the local, national, and international communities, and is generally more centrally organised than regular Kadampa Buddhist centres. Besides having a program of courses for the local community, KMCs host major gatherings such as dharma celebrations, national festivals, and international festivals. They are also home to the International Kadampa Temples. KMCs are non-profit organisations and all their annual profits are donated to the International Temples Project. There are currently 18 KMCs around the world, with several in the US.

The NKT-IKBU has also established a Kadampa Buddhist Temple in the United Kingdom, as well as in New York, Arizona, Brazil, Portugal, and Spain.

== Mainstream Reception ==
=== Public perception and controversies ===
The NKT has received criticism from former members and online advocacy groups for its internal culture, exclusivism, and its involvement in Dorje Shugden protests. The religious information charity Inform, reported a high volume of public inquiries on the NKT, coinciding with international protest campaigns, particularly in 2007–2008, 2010, and 2015. Inform is as an information-gathering body responsible for tracking public queries and does not evaluate institutional harm. The NKT state that their centres offer community support consistent with their registered charity objectives.

=== Involvement in Dorje Shugden demonstrations ===
Beginning in 1996, following the 14th Dalai Lama's public advice and restrictions against the practice of Dorje Shugden, members of the New Kadampa Tradition participated in demonstrations organised by the Shugden Supporters Community (SSC) and later the International Shugden Community (ISC) during the Dalai Lama's visits to the West. While scholars and media reports noted the majority of protesters were also NKT practitioners, the NKT denied acting as a front for these organising groups.

In 2015, a Reuters investigation examining the financing and coordination of the International Shugden Community reported that some Tibetan diaspora monks linked to the group had received encouragement from Chinese state actors. However, Tibetologist Robert Barnett noted that there was no evidence linking UK-based NKT or Western protestors to Chinese state funding or direction.

=== Outreach and growth ===
Scholars have said that the NKT's use of publicity is unusual among Buddhist groups. Ken Jones says the NKT is comparatively more "forceful and extroverted" than other Buddhist groups, and this has helped it recruit new members. One factor in recruitment, according to Helen Waterhouse, is that an NKT-IKBU centre often hosts activities every day, in contrast to other groups "which meet on a weekly basis but provide little other support or activity".

David Kay says that the NKT-IKBU is sensitive to criticism on the subject of expansion. Robert Bluck attributes NKT-IKBU's rapid growth to "a wish to share the Dharma rather than 'conversion and empire-building'".

== See also ==
- Heruka Kadampa Meditation Centre
- New religious movement

== Sources ==
- Barnett, Robert (12 December 2014). "Protests against the Dalai Lama over Dorje Shugden – An interview with Robert Barnett". info-buddhism.com.
- Blomfield, Vishvapani (14 October 2022). "Kelsang Gyatso obituary". The Guardian. ISSN 0261-3077.
- Bluck, Robert (2006). British Buddhism: Teachings, practice and development (PDF). Routledge critical studies in Buddhism. London: Routledge Curzon. ISBN 1134158173. Archived from the original on 8 August 2014.
- "Buddhism: Tibetan Buddhism". BBC Religion & Ethics.
- Clarke, Peter Bernard (2006). New Religions in Global Perspective: Religious Change in the Modern World. London: Routledge. p. 92. ISBN 9780415257480.
- Cozort, Daniel (2003). "The Making of the Western Lama". In Prebish, Charles S.; Heine, Steven (eds.). Buddhism in the modern world: Adaptations of an ancient tradition. Oxford University Press. pp. 221–248. ISBN 0198033575.
- Dalai Lama (23 November 2023). "His Holiness the Dalai Lama's Advice Concerning Dorje Shugden". The 14th Dalai Lama.
- "Dorje Shugden (Dolgyal): Untangling a Complex Issue". info-buddhism.com.
- Dreyfus, Georges (1998). "The Shugden Affair: Origins of a Controversy (Part II)". The Office of His Holiness The Dalai Lama. Archived from the original on 11 December 2016.
- Fish, Isaac Stone (2 October 2025). "Meet the Buddhists Who Hate the Dalai Lama More Than the Chinese Do". Foreign Policy.
- Hay, Mark (16 March 2015). "The Followers of a Wrathful Buddhist Spirit Versus the Dalai Lama". VICE.
- Hertog, Judith (2018). "The One Pure Dharma". Tricycle: The Buddhist Review (Summer 2018).
- "Kadampa: The New Kadampa Tradition". BBC Religion & Ethics. 4 July 2003. Archived from the original on 10 April 2009.
- Kay, David N. (1997). "The New Kadampa Tradition and the Continuity of Tibetan Buddhism in Transition". Journal of Contemporary Religion. 12 (3). Routledge: 277–293. doi:10.1080/13537909708580806.
- Kay, David N. (2004). Tibetan and Zen Buddhism in Britain: Transplantation, development and adaptation (PDF). London: Routledge Curzon. ISBN 0-415-29765-6. Archived from the original (PDF) on 1 July 2017.
- Lague, David; Mooney, Paul; Kang Kim, Benjamin (21 December 2015). "China co-opts a Buddhist sect in global effort to smear the Dalai Lama". Reuters.
- Loader, Gwyn (28 September 2023). "Religion: Anglesey dad fears Buddhist group brainwashed son". BBC News.
- Lopez, Donald (1998a). Prisoners of Shangri-La: Tibetan Buddhism and the West. Chicago & London: University of Chicago Press. ISBN 978-0-226-49310-7.
- Lopez, Donald (1998b), "An Interview With Geshe Kelsang Gyatso", Tricycle Magazine
- Macartney, Jane (22 June 2007). "Interpol on trail of Buddhist killers". The Times. Archived from the original on 28 October 2014.
- Matthews, Carol S. (2005). New Religions. Religions of the World. Chelsea House Publishers. pp. 128–143. ISBN 0-7910-8096-X.
- Obadia, Lionel (2020). "When New Is Not-So-New: On the Meaning of "Modern" in a New Tibetan Movement: The New Kadampa Tradition". In Kim, David W. (ed.). New Religious Movements in Modern Asian History: Socio-Cultural Alternatives. Ethnographies of Religion. Lanham, Maryland: Rowman & Littlefield. pp. 91–112. ISBN 978-1-7936-3403-0. OCLC 1220880253.
- Pritchard, Stephen (4 July 2015). "The readers' editor on... Buddhism and organised lobbying". The Guardian. ISSN 0261-3077.
- Schaik, Sam van (2011), Tibet: A History, Yale University Press
- "Sera Je Monastery: Declaration of Expulsion". Shambhala Pubs. Translated by Gendun Gyatso and David Patt. 6 March 2017.
- Sparham, Gareth (13 July 2020) [28 October 2011]. "Tsongkhapa". www.oxfordbibliographies.com. Oxford: Oxford University Press. doi:10.1093/obo/9780195393521-0169. ISBN 978-0-19-539352-1. Archived from the original on 17 January 2021.
- Waterhouse, Helen (1997). Buddhism in Bath: Adaptation and Authority (PDF). Community Religions Project Monograph. Oxford University Press. ISBN 1871363055.
- Waterhouse, Helen (2001). "Representing western Buddhism: a United Kingdom focus". In Beckerlegge, Gwilym (ed.). From Sacred Text to Internet. Religion today: tradition, modernity and change series. Ashgate. pp. 117–160. ISBN 0-7546-0816-6.
