= Domo Geshe Rinpoche =

Posthumous photograph of Geshe Ngawang Kalsang

Domo Geshe Rinpoche (1866-1936) is said to have been Shariputra, the Mahadsiddha Gayadhara, Dharmashri, Munijnana, Tönmi Sambhota, King Trisong Detsen, Dromtönpa, Milarepa, Khedrup Rinpoche, and Dragpa Gyaltsen in previous lives.

At the age of 8 he received the name Ngawang Kalsang, upon entering Tashi Lhunpo Monastery. After 20 years of study he received the "kachen" degree, Tashi Lhunpo's equivalent of the "geshe" degree.

Later, he left the monastery and meditated for 12 years in various caves and retreats in the mountain wilderness of Southern Tibet. One day a lost herdsman discovered him in retreat in a cave, and brought word back to the people of the valley. They requested him to settle among them and teach, and he did so. From the book The Way of the White Clouds, written by a Western student of the lama:

There was a very small and poor monastery in the valley from which the people had come, situated on a steep hill with a rocky crest in the middle of a fertile wheat growing valley called Domo (wheat). This place was given to the Hermit-Lama, who from then on was known as Domo Geshe Rinpoche, 'The Learned Jewel of the Wheat Valley'.

Upon request by the people of Domo to stay with them, Geshe Rinpoche rebuilt Dungkar Gonpa (White Conch Monastery). It was so named after several white conch manifestations there. He enlarged the main Buddha statue of the monastery and built a Maitreya Buddha statue, as a symbol of the spiritual future. During his travels in India, he was entrusted with several more monasteries. A patron from Darjeeling offered him a retreat house at Ghoom Yiga Chöling Monastery and requested him to take care of the monastery. Rinpoche enlarged it and built another famous two-storey Maitreya Buddha statue. In 1919 Tashi Chöling Monastery in Kurseong, near Darjeeling, was completed and consecrated by Geshe Rinpoche, and Tharpa Chöling Monastery in Kalimpong was finished in 1922.

Domo Geshe Rinpoche was the first of the Tibetan lamas to go on pilgrimage repeatedly to the Buddhist holy sites in India. It was on one of these pilgrimages that he had his most well-known vision:

At nineteen thousand feet on the northern slopes of Kanchenjuna, Chorten Nyima has been a very special holy place since at least the time of Padma Sambhava. There Domo Geshe Rinpoche manifested a vision for all within a radius of miles to see. First, from among the white clouds appeared a white horse leading the procession that moved from east to west. Then from the dark blue sky a great number of Buddhas, Bodhisattvas, and different holy beings and signs appeared, all made from light and rainbows. Only Domo Geshe Rinpoche saw the whole extent of the vision, while those in his retinue saw parts according to individual capacity and karma. Some saw Khedrup Rinpoche 's five visions of Je Tsongkhapa; some saw Je Tsongkhapa and his two main disciples, while other saw the Medicine Buddha, Amitayus, or different pure lands. Everyone could see the eight auspicious signs. The vision remained for a long time, so Rinpoche's disciples could point out to each other in minutest detail what they saw. The only other vision of that magnitude made public in the same way occurred at the time of Shakyamuni Buddha, an account of which can be found in the Surangama Sutra. After the eyewitnesses returned to Dungkar Gonpa each of them described what they had seen, and from these descriptions a fresco recording the event was carefully painted.

After his passing in 1936, Dungkar Gonpa requested the Central Tibetan government for permission to embalm the body of Domo Geshe Rinpoche. At the time, only Je Tsongkhapa, the Dalai Lamas, and the Panchen Lamas customarily embalmed and sealed in large stupas. In granting permission, the Regent Reting Rinpoche said, "In Southern Tibet, including Sikkim, etc., Domo Geshe Rinpoche's activities were exactly like those of Je Tsongkhapa. In accordance, we will allow Rinpoche's body to be preserved."

== Domo Geshe Rinpoche Ngawang Jigme (1937–2001) ==
The second Domo Geshe Rinpoche was recognized by Pabongka Rinpoche and Trijang Rinpoche, and became a direct disciple of Trijang Rinpoche. He completed the Geshe Lharampa degree at Sera Monastery in 1958, shortly before the Chinese invasion. Before leaving Tibet for India in 1961, he gathered a number of very rare manuscript collections. He also collected the sets of textbooks used by the different colleges of Sera, Drepung, and Ganden. In 1966 he and Trijang Rinpoche instituted an annual Ganden Ngamchö procession in Kalimpong and Darjeeling on the parinirvana anniversary of Je Tsongkhapa, founder of the Gelug school of Tibetan Buddhism. He was known for providing aid to the poor, education to children and healing to the sick.

In 1976 he moved to the United States and established the Dungkar Gonpa Society, a not-for-profit organization. From his center Gangjong Namgyal ("the All Victorious Snow Land") in the Catskill Mountains, he gave advice, oral transmissions and retreats until dying in 2001.

== Reincarnations of Rinpoche ==
On 28 October 2005, the Dalai Lama graciously issued the official sealed decree proclaiming that the boy named Tenzin Woeden, born to father ogyen Tenzin and mother Lobsang Dolma in the South Indian Tibetan refugee settlement in Bylakuppe was the true reincarnation of Dromo Geshe Rinpoche. On 16 April 2006 the 3rd Dromo Geshe Rinpoche was escorted from his parental home to the Sera Thekchenling Monastery in a traditional procession amidst the fragrance of incense with sacred sounds of traditional religious musical instruments. Upon arrival an enthronement ceremony was done in Sera Jey Monastery, followed by ceremonies at Drati Khangtsen and Tsangpa Khangtsen. At his official residence, the Labrang, he showed remarkable dignity and presence even at such a young age and never showed any uneasiness even when his parents started leaving.

On 9 January 2007 the 14th Dalai Lama himself ordained the young Dromo Tulku in his private chamber during his visit to Sera Jey Monastery. The young Tulku was given the name Tenzin Jigmey Lhundup. On 22 August 2007 at his own Tharpa Choeling Monastery in Kalimpong (West Bengal, India) a grand enthronement ceremony and his formal admission to the Monastery were held.

Another reincarnation of Domo Geshe Rinpoche was recognized and confirmed by Trijang Chocktrul Rinpoche after divination and prayers from 2002 to 2006. In 2008 he was officially enthroned at Dung Guen Samtencholing, Darjeeling, his principal monastery in India; at Tashi Choling, his monastery in West Bengal; at Enchey House, the ancestral home and seat of the previous Domo Geshe Rinpoche in Sikkim; and at Gangjong Namgyal in New York. At Shar Gaden monastery since 2009, he is currently studying with tutors under the guidance of his guru Trijang Chocktrul Rinpoche.
