= Zong Rinpoche =

Tibetan Lama (1906-1984)

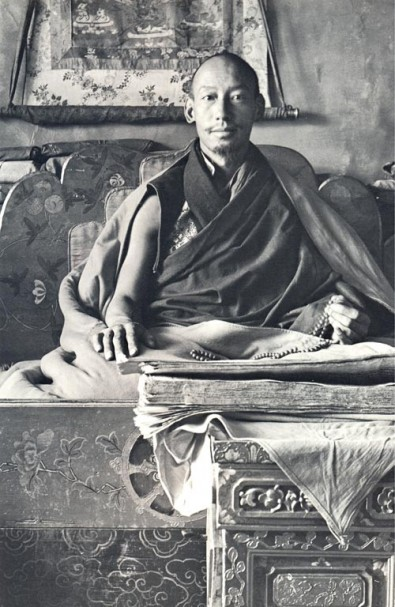
Zong Rinpoche in Tibet

Zong Rinpoche (1905-1984 AD) was a Gelug Lama and disciple of the third Trijang Rinpoche, junior tutor of the 14th Dalai Lama. He was famous as a sharp analyst and master of philosophical debate, as well as a Tantric practitioner. He was the Abbot of Ganden Shartse monastery.

== Early life, education, and spiritual lineage ==
Zongtrul Jetsun Losang Tsöndru Thubten Gyaltsen (or Kyabje Zong Rinpoche, as he is known to disciples) was born in 1905 in the village of Nangsang in the Kham province of eastern Tibet. His father and both his grandfathers were ngakpa, tantric practitioners of the Nyingma tradition, and two previous incarnations of Kyabje Dorje Chang ("Vajradhara, Lord of Refuge," as Kyabje Zong Rinpoche was also known) had taken birth within the Zong-go family: Zongtrul Phuntsok Chöpel and Zongtrul Tenpa Chöpel (1836-1899 AD).

He went to Lhasa in 1916 when he was eleven years old to study Buddhadharma as presented in Je Tsongkhapa's tradition at Ganden Shartse Monastery, one of the principal Gelug monasteries and seats of learning in Tibet. When he got there, the fourteen-year-old Trijang Rinpoche (who was to become one of the main tutors of the 14th Dalai Lama) guided the new student by taking him through his first lesson in elementary dialectics. He was later to become Zong Rinpoche's chief mentor.

Although recognized as a reincarnate Lama, Zong Rinpoche did not have the privileges accorded to modern-day tulkus. He had no benefactor to support him and lived a spartan existence:

Instead of a table from which to read the scriptures, he made do with an empty tea box supported by bricks. He was completely focused on his studies, which he pursued with unfailing courage and diligence. He seemed uninterested in food or drink, surviving on a very simple diet. With his humble lifestyle and shabby robes, often loose and torn from the physicality of the debate ground, he looked like any other boy from the remote province of Kham who had been fortunate enough to attend this prestigious monastic university.

Zong Rinpoche received his full ordination from the Thirteenth Dalai Lama at the Potala Palace. At Ganden, Zong Rinpoche studied the Sutras of the Prajnaparamita, Madhyamaka, the Abidharma and the Vinaya. He was said to study effortlessly and became well known throughout the three great Gelug monasteries of central Tibet, Ganden, Drepung, and Sera as a master of philosophical debate who possessed an extraordinary memory. Upon debating the opening verse of Pramanavarttika, the foremost dissertation on Buddhist logic by the famed seventh-century Indian logician Acharya Dharmakirti, Zong Rinpoche's performance led the famous Geshe "Amdo" Sherab Gyatso to remark: "There would not be a worthier debate on this subject even if Dharmakirti himself were here in person!" After graduating as the highest-ranking Lharampa Geshe at the age of only twenty-five in 1929, he moved on to the Tantric College of Gyuto, where he also successfully completed his examinations.

His Spiritual Guide was Trijang Rinpoche. Kyabje Zong Rinpoche often mentioned to his resident students, as an instruction on Guru devotion, that he had never harbored a negative thought for his teacher, Trijang Rinpoche, for even a single instant. Trijang Rinpoche's own Spiritual Guide was Pabongkhapa Déchen Nyingpo, and Zong Rinpoche deeply revered both Lamas and practiced and promoted their Gelugpa lineage his entire life, including relying upon the Dharma Protector Dorje Shugden:

Kyabje Trijang Rinpoche and Kyabje Ling Rinpoche were tutors to His Holiness the Dalai Lama. They taught His Holiness everything from basic teachings to advanced levels. Kyabje Phabongka passed all of his lineages to Kyabje Trijang Dorje Chang. He often said this in discourses. The purpose of this detailed exposition is to affirm the power of the lineage. If we lose faith in the lineage, we are lost.

== Achievements ==
Following his studies at Gyuto Tantric Monastery and preceding his traveling to teach in the West, he served nine years as Abbot of Ganden Shartse College beginning in 1937, during which he brought about new heights of scholarship and monastic discipline among the monks, as well as raising living standards for the poorest of them. As it is described in his biography:

The influence of Zong Rinpoche's term as Abbot is still felt today. As well as reaching new heights of scholarship, Ganden Shartse became an outstanding example of monastic discipline, something that Zong Rinpoche held to be of vital importance. He also inspired a strong interest in Tantra, Chod, and monastic ritual, and significantly improved the monastery's administrative structure. Having personally experienced the difficulties faced by its poorer members, Zong Rinpoche introduced reforms that went a long way toward improving their situation.

Zong Rinpoche resigned from his seat in 1946 and went on a long pilgrimage to Tsari, southeastern Tibet. He became renowned for healing activities and 'many actions of powerful magic,' as a result of which 'the most marvellous, indescribable signs occurred.'

His name spread all over the country of being a powerful Tantrika and he gave many empowerments and teachings on those subjects with a special emphasis on the Tantras of Heruka, Hayagriva, Yamantaka, Guhyasamaja, Vajrayogini, Green Tara, Mahakali, White Tara, Vaishravana and others.

== Leaving Tibet and life in India ==
In 1959, after repeated appeals from his disciples and students all over the country who were concerned for his safety, Zong Rinpoche left Tibet and sought asylum in India. In the remote settlement of Buxa in the Indian state of Assam on the Bhutanese border, he joined the surviving members of Ganden, Drepung, and Sera monasteries, as well as monks from other Tibetan monasteries. Zong Rinpoche gave a great number of teachings, and "in doing so, rekindled the flame of Buddha's doctrine in exile. For the refugee monks, Rinpoche's inspired commentaries on Buddhadharma offered a revitalizing hope and relief from complete despair."

In 1965, Zong Rinpoche became the director of the newly formed Tibetan Schools Teachers Training Program in Mussoorie (north-west India), overseeing 58 scholars from all the major traditions of Tibetan Buddhism. This educational nucleus proved crucial to the success of the fledgling Tibetan refugee settlements and had far-reaching benefits for all the Tibetan schools that were subsequently established. In 1967, he was appointed as the first principal of the new Central Institute of Tibetan Higher Studies at Sarnath, Varanasi, India.

After retiring from public life in 1971, Zong Rinpoche spent his time in deep spiritual practices. During these quiet years, he would occasionally give teachings on practical aspects of Vajrayana.

In the spring of 1974, at the request of Lama Thubten Yeshe, he visited Kopan Monastery in Nepal for the first time and gave teachings to over 200 students at the Kopan Meditation Course, his first teachings to a Western audience, and extensive teachings to the Tibetan monks at Kopan as well.

== Teachings in the West ==
In response to a request by Lama Thubten Yeshe, he made his first trip to the West in 1978, where he taught at several FPMT centers. At the request of Geshe Lhundub Sopa, he also taught at what later became Deer Park Buddhist Center in Madison Wisconsin. A two-week course he gave at Camp Kennolyn, Soquel CA, was translated by Lama Zopa Rinpoche and will be published by the Lama Yeshe Wisdom Archive at some point. After that, he travelled two more times outside India, where he again taught on the full range of Buddhist thought and practice and gave many personal interviews. Most notably, in early 1984 he came from Switzerland to visit the ailing Lama Yeshe in California and in March that year returned to officiate at Lama Yeshe's cremation at Vajrapani Institute. Zong Rinpoche had many devoted Western disciples. One of them described him: "He was one of the last teachers of the old generation with the aura of authority and a kind of aristocratic touch or vajra pride. In his teachings he followed very strictly the original texts. But, concerning his age, he was very open and patient to us Westerners, always kind, polite and helpful to answer our many questions concerning detailed tantra explanations."

He visited Manjushri Institute in the UK on a couple of occasions where he gave many teachings and empowerments into the practice of Heruka and Vajrayogini.

== His Disciples ==
Zong Rinpoche had many disciples in Tibet, India and the West. He was the teacher of Geshe Lhundub Sopa, Lama Thubten Yeshe, Lama Zopa Rinpoche, Tsem Rinpoche and Geshe Tsultim Gyeltsen.

== His death ==
In 1983, Kyabje Zong Rinpoche made his third trip to the West and embarked on a teaching tour that took him to England, Canada, the U.S., Switzerland, Spain, France, Germany, Italy and Austria. In June 1984, at age 80, he returned to his home at Ganden Monastery, by then reestablished in Mundgod in southern India. The following month, he gave instructions on the Hayagriva Tantra, followed by the Chittamani Tara initiation, and a long life empowerment for all the Tibetans in Mundgod's refugee community. After a few days of rituals, the students at Zong Labrang, his residential compound, reported that he had fallen ill with a high fever. Although his doctors gave him the best medical care, his condition did not improve.

All the students at his residence and monastery offered numerous long life prayers. Delegates from Drepung and Sera monasteries, including representatives of the two Tantric colleges, Gyuto and Gyume, and all of the incarnate Lamas of the great Buddhist institutions, came to offer long life prayers. Four months later, at the beginning of November 1984, he declared, "I do not have any of my former illness." Once again, in apparently good health, he resumed his daily routine and presided over the ceremony to determine the new incarnation of Trijang Rinpoche.

Zong Rinpoche engaged in the self-empowerment rituals of Heruka Chakrasamvara, Vajrayogini, and Chittamani Tara over long periods of time, and his assistants observed him in "unusual states of absorption". Zong Rinpoche normally awoke at three o'clock in the morning and finished his daily meditation before dawn. Shortly after 9am on November 15, Buddha's Descent from Heaven Day, his assistant called a medical doctor from the Dueguling Tibetan Resettlement Hospital. Zong Rinpoche walked from his bedroom into his sitting room, saying that he would like to sit in an upright posture. When the students entered the room a few minutes later, Zong Rinpoche, still seated, had died. His students reported how his body remained as if in a deep sleep, without losing luster or color.

Zong Rinpoche's stupa (Tib: dung-ten) was completed in 1986 by members of Zong Labrang, where it is today. It stands five feet high, is covered with precious stones and metals, and is filled with relics and holy objects.
