= Tharpa Choling Monastery =

Gelugpa monastery in Kalimpong, India

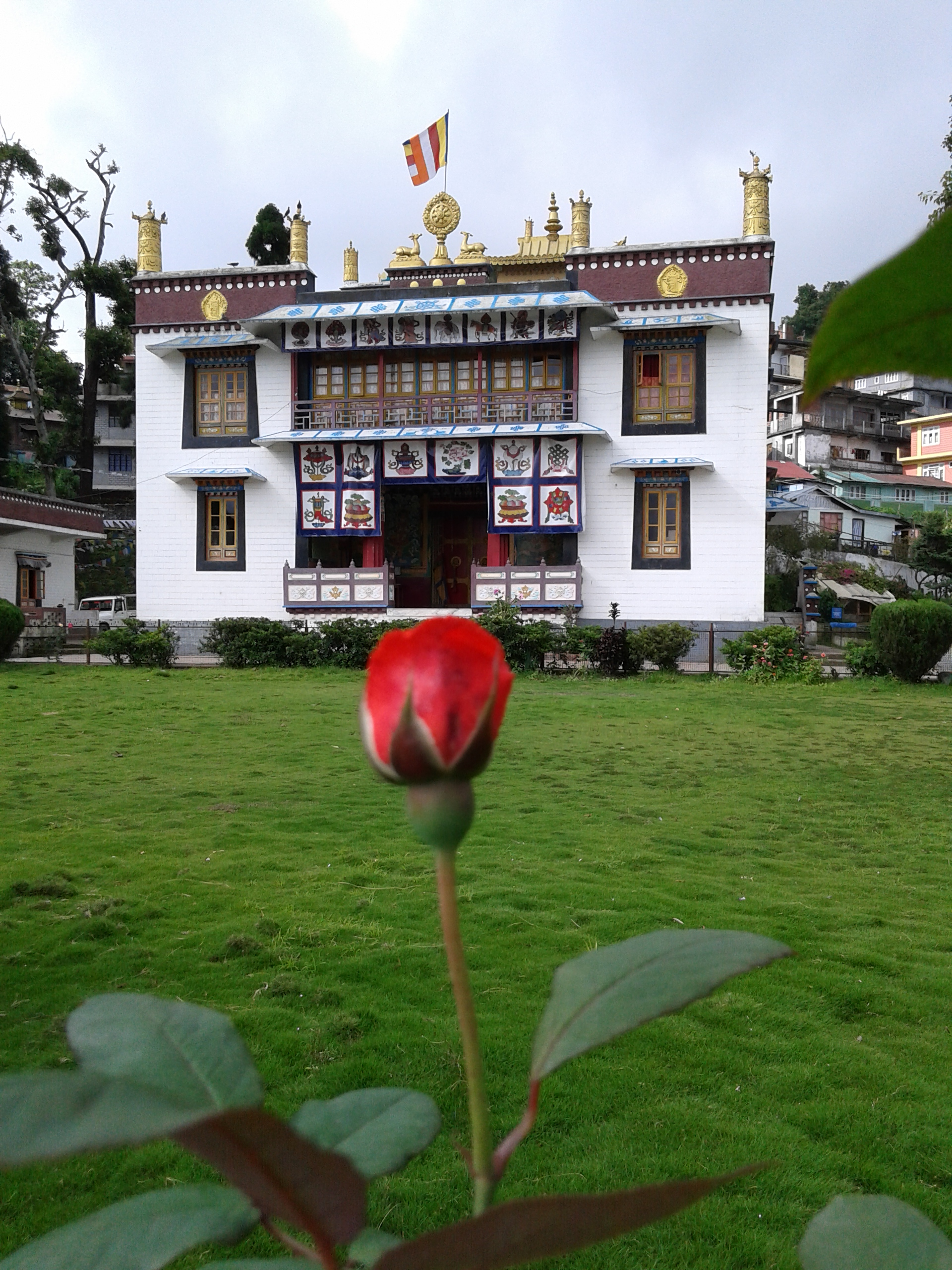
- Gaden Tharpa Choling Monastery

Religion
- Affiliation: Tibetan Buddhism
- Sect: Gelug

Location
- Location: Kalimpong, West Bengal, India
- Interactive map of Tharpa Choling Monastery
- Coordinates: 27.079°N 88.482°E

Architecture
- Style: Dzong
- Founder: Domo Geshe Rinpoche Ngawang Kalsang
- Established: 1912; 114 years ago

Gaden Tharpa Choling Monastery is a Gelugpa monastery situated at the top of Tirpa hills in Kalimpong, India. The monastery was founded by Domo Geshe Rinpoche Ngawang Kalsang in 1912.

History says that Domo Geshe Rinpoche lived in Kalimpong in 1906 when he came to India for pilgrimage and to collect medicinal plants from India, Nepal and Bhutan. At the request of the Tibetan merchants and some Bhutanese leaders living in Kalimpong to establish a monastery there, Rinpoche instituted this monastery. Gaden Tharpa Choling monastery is a non-profitable development Association, registered under the West Bengal Societies Registration Act, 1961.

== History ==
On the 1st day of the 11th month of the Water-Mouse year, (1912) Mrs. Trinlay Gyalmo, (the sister-in-law of Rani Chonyi Wangmo of Bhutan House) and her husband Bhawalolo constructed the Monastery with a main prayer hall, monk's dormitory and a private residence for Rinpoche on the donated 7 acres land which was orange garden then. Mrs Trinlay Gyalmo also donated 21 acres of paddy field for up-keeping precious artefacts of the Monastery. Rani Chonyi Wangmo sponsored for the renovation of the Chinese temple, Gesar Lhangang and donated generously for the monk's living. Gradually, novice monks came from every part of Tibet from all different schools of Tibetan Buddhism and joined the Monastery. There were monks from Mongolia, Ladakh, Kinnaur, Tawang, Arunachal Pradesh besides Sherpa, Tamang and Gurung monks. As of now, there are 55 resident monks of Tibetan, Monpa, Sherpa, Tamang and Gurung origin.

After the death of Domo Geshe Rinpoche Ngawang Kalsang in 1939, the senior monks of Tharpa Choling Monastery appealed to the Tibetan government to take over the administration of the Monastery. As the new incarnation of this Rinpoche was yet to be found, and when found he would be too young to take over the administrative responsibilities of the Monastery, therefore, the Tibetan Government decided to appoint abbot from Sera, Drepung and Gaden to administer the monastery. The first deputed abbot of Tharpa Choling Monastery was Khenpo Lodoe Dorje who was Geshe from Gaden Monastery. The second abbot was Drepung Tsawa Khangtsen Mani Tulku. These two abbots were appointed before the Chinese invasion of Tibet in 1959. After the occupation of Tibet, the Department of Religion and Culture, Tibetan Government in Exile appointed Rikya Rinpoche as the third abbot and Serje Khensur Lobsang Dhonyoe as the fourth abbot of the monastery.

=== Updates ===
In 2005 the 14th Dalai Lama said that he had found the reincarnation of the third Domo Geshe Rinpoche in Bylakuppe through prophecy and divination. In deference to his directives the Tharpa Choling Monastery banned the worship of Dorjee Shugden. The Monastery is under the direct supervision of the religious department and the Dalai Lama Administration.

== Discipline of the monastery ==
The monastery's discipline is based on the regulations laid down by the 13th Dalai Lama in abidance with the rules of the Vinaya, the spiritual code of conducts.

== Others shrines of the monastery campus ==
=== Ge-sar Lhagang or the Chinese temple ===
This temple was once situated in Kali Jhora and was almost destroyed by landslides. Later, it was shifted to Tharpa Choling Monastery campus and located near the residence of Domo Geshe Rinpoche by Rani Choenyi Wangmo in 1912. A Mongolian monk translated the soothing texts from Mongolian to Tibetan and composed a prayer to propitiate Ges-sar the deity and Dakhang, monthly prayers are offered to Ges-sar. The temple was famous for Tao-Chen, the Chinese school of divination through which future can be forecast.

=== Lha-Ten ===
Lha-Ten is the temple of the protector deity of the monastery. It is situated behind the main hall on the left and comprises three structures, two in front and a white one at the back side. The front Lhaten with ‘Tri’ letter is the temple of Nechung Choegyal and the second with the letter ‘Kyee’ is the temple of Tashi Woebar while the white temple at the back with the letter ‘Kyee’ is the temple of Jowo Ching Karwa. Nechung Choegyal who is the main protector deity of Tibet while Tashi Woebar and Jowo Ching Karwa are the main deities of Tharpa Choling Monastery.

=== Lu-Khang, the temple of Naga ===
The Lu-Khang has a Trishul and the Naga of this temple is believed to be a female. In 1994, when an old woman living near Enchai Monastery in Gangtok was possessed by a spirit, in trance she spoke out in very pure Tibetan and said, "I came from Tibet with Domo Geshe Rinpoche Ngawang Kalsang to India and lived here in Tharpa Choling Monastery campus. During the renovation of the Congregational hall the workers and labourers dumped filthy waste near my shrine and I could hardly live there as the surroundings got defiled. Kindly convey my plight to Rinpoche". Rinpoche immediately ordered the monks to clean the surroundings and forbade the labourers to go anywhere near the Naga Shrine.

=== Mani Lhagang ===
A prayer wheel was constructed by Lama Ngawang Kalsang and it was situated at the left of the Main Hall entrance. It was shifted to a separate room when the renovation of the Main Hall started.

=== Shrine for Shangmo Dorje Bhuti ===
It is said that Shangmo was once a demon who disguised as a nomad woman. She was tamed by Sakya Gongma Rinpoche. Around 1902, Shangmo escaped from the Sakya Monastery and followed Domo Geshe Rinpoche to Dungkar Gonpa, as Rinpoche also was the native of the same place, "Shang". There at Dungkar Gonpa, she was bound under solemn oath to protect the monastery. In Tharpa Cholling, the storekeeper ordered Shangmo to protect the ration store room of Tharpa Choling monastery. Shangmo stayed in the store room up to the renovation of monastery. Now her abode has been shifted to Mani Lhagang with her special shrine.

== School and education ==
In 1956, a primary school was established according to requirement of the younger generation monks. The primary school admitted local people from poor and needy families. After the Chinese invasion in 1959, many exiled Tibetan students received education from this monastic school. The younger monks got their basic education from the school in reading and writing Tibetan script. In accordance with the direction of the Dalai Lama, Tharpa Choling Monastery established a separate school only for monks in the monastic campus. Teaching modern education was initiated in the monastic school in 2010. In 2010 a Geshe from Sera Jey Drati Khangtsen, named Geshe Tenzin Chogdup, was appointed as a religious teacher by the Office of the Dalai Lama. Geshe la looks after the monastic education such as text memorization in the morning and prayers recitation in the evening. Geshela also teaches the monks every alternative day. Geshe la's taught Lam-Rim and Drup-Tha in the daytime. Some of college students and school teachers receive special teaching from Geshela during Geshe la's break times. The monastery also organizes a Dharma Teaching class for the people of Kalimpong and neighbouring places on Sunday. Geshe la is popular in Kalimpong as his method of teaching is clear and easy to understand. For the monastic school, there are two teachers for English and Tibetan language.

== Administration ==
Generally, the administration of Tharpa Choling Monastery is directly undertaken by Domo Geshe Rinpoche. However, sometimes, the Tibetan Government in Exile supervises the administration in the absence of Domo Geshe Rinpoche, or the new reincarnation of the Rinpoche is too young to take over the administration responsibilities of the monastery. As of 2012 the monastery was under the direct supervision of the Private Office of the Dalai Lama and the Department of Religion and Culture, Central Tibetan Administration.

== Source of income ==
Mrs. Trinlay Gyalmo and her family, and Maharani of Bhutan House were the only income source that the Tharpa Choling monastery dependent to. Gradually, the elder people died and the younger generations being not interested in sponsoring the monastery, the monastery's income source broke. In the meantime, the Dungkar Gonpa Society fully supported the livelihood of the monastery. The believed reincarnation of Domo Geshe Rinpoche was found in Bylakuppe, South India, through prophecy and divination by the 14th Dalai Lama. The reincarnated boy's name was Tenzin Woeden. At present, there is not a single monk in Tharpa Choling monastery given devotion to Dorje Shugden deity. Since then the Dungkar Gonpa Society stopped supporting the monastery and it comes under the direct supervision of the Department of Religion and Culture, Central Tibetan Administration and the private office of the Dalai Lama.

== The relationship between the people of Kalimpong and the Tharcho Monastery ==
Since the establishment of the Tharpa Choling Monastery by the Domo Geshe Rinpoche Ngawang Kalsang, the relation between with Tharpa Choling Monastery and the people of Kalimpong was warm, cordial and harmonious. The devotion towards the deity Dorje Shugden defamed the monastery, but finally reconciled with its sincere ban of practicing and giving devotion to the Dorje Shugden after the rightful and genuine reincarnation of Domo Geshe Rinpoche was found through prophecy and divination given by the 14th Dalai Lama and his enthronement.
