= Heruka Kadampa Meditation Centre =

Coordinates: 51.5716°N 0.1987°W

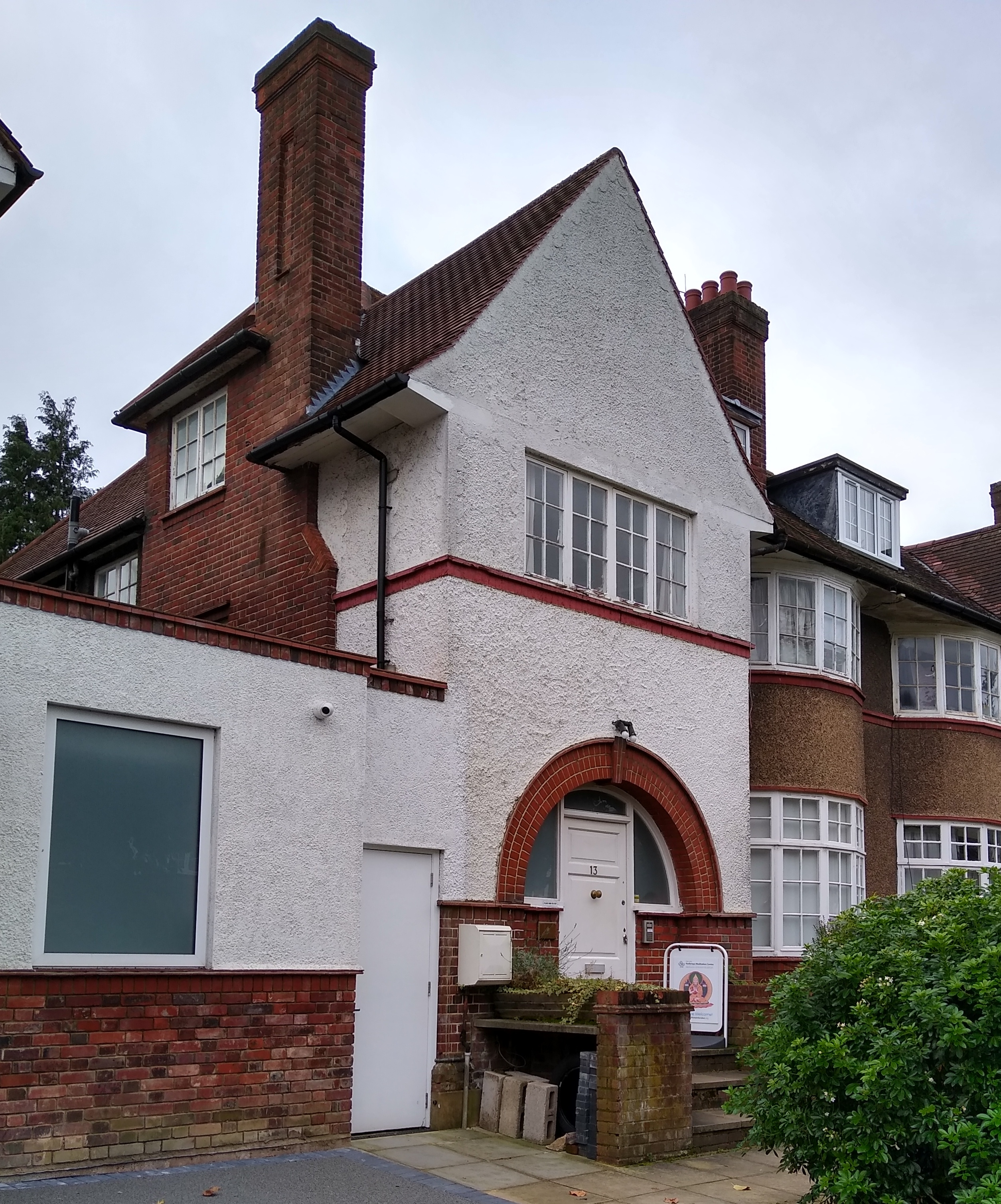
Heruka Kadampa Meditation Centre

Heruka Kadampa Meditation Centre (KMC) is member of the New Kadampa Tradition of Buddhism operating in North & Central London and in parts of Hertfordshire. Located in Golders Green, the Centre was founded in 1992 aiming "to provide a venue for Kadampa teachings in the London region". Roughly 20 students live and study at Heruka KMC. In addition the main meditation room, the Centre contains a small library and a shop that offers books published by Tharpa Publications, CDs, and artwork, and gifts.

The Centre organises weekly meditation classes at over 15 venues in and around London. The classes feature guided meditations, basic Buddhist teachings, and question-and-answer sessions. Kadam John McBretney serves as the Resident Teacher for the Centre, and is responsible for teaching the main weekly classes taught at the Centre.

Heruka KMC also runs special weekend meditation courses on a regular basis. These courses take a closer look at particular aspects of Buddhism and meditation. In addition, the Centre offers study programmes for the in-depth study of Geshe Kelsang Gyatso's commentaries to Buddhist texts, and regular meditation retreats. Pujas, or chanted meditations, are also regularly held at the Centre.

Heruka KMC is a member of the New Kadampa Tradition, which comprises over 1,100 Centres and classes around the globe.
