= Pabongkhapa Déchen Nyingpo =

Tibetan Gelugpa lama (1878-1941)

- ཕ་བོང་ཁ་པ་བདེ་ཆེན་སྙིང་པོ
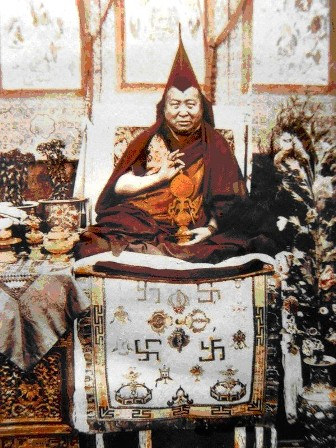

Personal life
- Born: byams pa bstan 'dzin 'phrin las 1878
- Died: 1941 (aged 62–63)

Religious life
- Religion: Tibetan Buddhism
- School: Gelug

Pabongkhapa Déchen Nyingpo (Tibetan: ཕ་བོང་ཁ་པ་བདེ་ཆེན་སྙིང་པོ, Wylie: pha bong kha pa bde chen snying po; 1878–1941) was a Gelug lama in the modern era of Tibetan Buddhism. He obtained his Geshe degree at Sera Mey Monastic University in Lhasa and later became a teacher in Tibet, providing his services to laypeople and clergy alike. Pabongkha was offered the regency of the present Dalai Lama but declined the request, reportedly because "he strongly disliked political affairs."

== Practice of Buddhism ==
Ribur Rinpoche described how Phabongkhapa met his root Guru:

His root guru was Dagpo Lama Rinpoche Jampel Lhuendrub Gyatso, from Lhoka. He was definitely a bodhisattva, and Pabongkha Rinpoche was his foremost disciple. He lived in a cave in Pasang, and his main practice was bodhichitta; his main deity was Avalokiteshvara and he would recite 50,000 manis [the mantra, Om mani padme hum] every night. When Kyabje Pabongkha first met Dagpo Rinpoche at a tsog offering ceremony in Lhasa, he cried out of reverence from beginning to end.

According to Ribur Rinpoche:

Dagpo Lama Rinpoche would teach him a Lamrim topic and then Pabongkha Rinpoche would go away and meditate on it. Later, he would return to explain what he'd understood: if he had gained some realization, Dagpo Lama Rinpoche would teach him some more, and Pabongkha Rinpoche would go back and meditate on that. It went on like this for ten years.

Pabongkha Rinpoche was a renunciate. His attendant once demolished the small old building inhabited by Pabongkha Rinpoche while he was away on a long tour, and constructed in its place a large ornate residence trying to rival the private quarters of the Dalai Lama. When Pabongkha Rinpoche returned, he said, "I am only a minor hermit Lama, and you should not have built something like this for me. I am not famous, and the essence of what I teach is the renunciation of worldly life. Therefore, I am embarrassed by rooms like these."

According to Rilbur Rinpoche, any of Phabongkhapa's anger "had been completely pacified by his bodhichitta."

He would ask everyone in a line how they were and tap them on the head. Sometimes, he dispensed medicine.

His two main spiritual qualities, according to his disciples, were, from the Tantric point of view, his realization and ability to present Heruka, and from the Sutra point of view, his ability to teach Lamrim. He attributed all his qualities to his own Spiritual Guide.

According to one 'reincarnated' lama who attended his teachings: "He was an exceptionally learned and gifted scholar, and his interpretation of the Doctrine adhered to the meaning of the Lord Buddha's words exactly. He was short, broad-faced, and of rather heavy build, but when he opened his mouth to speak, his words had such clarity and sweetness that no one could help being moved."

In his memoir of his root Guru, Rilbur Rinpoche said:

When he taught, he would sit for up to eight hours without moving. About two thousand people would come to his general discourses and initiations, and fewer to special teachings, but when he gave Bodhisattva vows, up to ten thousand people would show up.

The introduction to Liberation in the Palm of Your Hand noted that:

Pabongkha Rinpoche was probably the most influential Gelug lama of this century, holding all the important lineages of sutra and tantra and passing them on to most of the important Gelug lamas of the next two generations; the list of his oral discourses is vast in depth and breadth. He was also the root guru of the Kyabje Ling Rinpoche (1903–83), Senior Tutor of the Dalai Lama, Trijang Rinpoche, and many other highly respected teachers. His collected works occupy fifteen large volumes and cover every aspect of Buddhism. If you have ever received a teaching from a Gelug lama, you have been influenced by Pabongkha Rinpoche.

In Geshe Ngawang Dhargyey's commentary to the Wheel of Sharp Weapons, he says:

Likewise, Lama Trijang Dorje Chang, Junior Tutor to His Holiness the present Dalai Lama, folds his hands upon the crown of his head whenever he mentions Kyabje Pabongkha Rinpoche. He was such a great lama, unsurpassed by any, that hardly any lamas or geshes of the Three Pillars (the monasteries of Ganden, Sera and Drepung) had not been his disciples.

In 1921, at Chuzang Hermitage near Lhasa, Pabongkha Rinpoche gave a historic 24-day exhibition on the Lamrim, or "stages of the path," that was attended by around 700 people. About 30 lamas and reincarnations of lamas came from the three major monasteries in Lhasa, and many more travelled weeks from the Central Province, from U-Tsang, and from as far away as Amdo and Kham. There were also many lay people present. Rato Khyongla Rinpoche, who was present, noted:

During that summer session, several traders and at least two high government officials found their lives transformed by his eloquence: they forsook their jobs to study religion and to give themselves to meditation.

Zong Rinpoche said:

Kyabje Trijang Rinpoche and Kyabje Ling Rinpoche were tutors to His Holiness the Dalai Lama. They taught His Holiness everything from basic teachings to advanced levels. Kyabje Phabongka passed all of his lineages to Kyabje Trijang Dorje Chang. He often said this in discourses. The purpose of this detailed exposition is to affirm the power of the lineage. If we lose faith in the lineage, we are lost.

According to Kyabje Zong Rinpoche:

Once Kyabje Phabongka invoked the wisdom beings of Heruka's mandala to enter into a statue of Heruka Chakrasamvara. Heruka then offered nectar to Kyabje Phabongka and prophesied that seven generations of his disciples would be protected by the body mandala of Heruka. Kyabje Trijang Rinpoche is cared for by Heruka Chakrasamvara, as are his disciples.

== Position on politics and religion ==
When the regency of the 14th Dalai Lama was offered to Pabongkha Rinpoche, he declined the opportunity, saying, "If one cannot give up the worldly dharma, then you are not a true religious person." According to Goldstein, Pabongkha was quite well known for saying that "lamas should not become involved in politics."

== Attempted alliance with Liu Wenhui ==
In 1935, Pabongkha attempted an alliance with Chinese warlord Liu Wenhui, who controlled the opium trade as well as the Kham region. Liu Wenhui had invaded Kham in the early 1930s, and by breaking a truce with Lhasa, had pushed his own territory all the way to the Yangtse river. This part of Kham was now known as the Chinese province of Xikang and, when he first met Pabongkha, Liu was fighting against a self-rule movement called 'Kham for Khampas', led by a popular Nyingma lama. In meeting him and attempting to form a relationship, Pabongkha believed it would ensure the success of the Gelug school in Kham, believing the warlord might become a patron.

== Deviations from Tsongkhapa's teachings ==
Dreyfus notes Pabongkha's deviations from Tsongkhapa's teachings:

...when compared with the main teachings of his tradition as they appear in Tsongkhapa's writings, Pabongkha's approach appears in several respects quite innovative. Although he insisted on the Stages of the Path (lamrim) as the basis of further practice, like other Gelug teachers, Pabongkha differed in recommending Vajrayogini as the central meditational deity of the Gelug tradition. This emphasis is remarkable given the fact that the practice of this deity came originally from the Sakura tradition and is not included in Tsongkhapa's original synthesis, which is based on the practice of three meditational deities (Yamantaka, Guhyasamaja, and Cakrasamvara). The novelty of his approach is even clearer when we consider Pabongkha's emphasis on Tara Cintamani as a secondary meditational deity, for this practice is not canonical in the strict sense of the term but comes from the pure visions of one of Pabongkha's main teachers, Ta bu Pe-ma Baz-ra (sta bu padma badzra), a figure about whom very little is presently known. We have to be clear, however, on the nature of Pabongkha's innovations. He did not introduce these practices himself, for he received them from teachers such as Ta bu Pe-ma Baz-ra and Dak-po Kel-zang Kay-drub (dwag po bskal bzang mkhas grub). Where Pabongkha was innovative was in making formerly secondary teachings widespread and central to the Gelug tradition and claiming that they represented the essence of Tsongkhapa's teaching. This pattern, which is typical of a revival movement, also holds for Pabongkha's wide diffusion, particularly at the end of his life, of the practice of Dorje Shukden as the central protector of the Gelug tradition. Whereas previously Shukden seems to have been a relatively minor protector in the Gelug tradition, Pabongkha made him into one of the main protectors of the tradition. In this way, he founded a new and distinct way of conceiving the teachings of the Gelug tradition that is central to the "Shukden Affair".

== Sectarianism ==
=== Position on the other schools ===
Pabongkha stated that the other schools go to hell:

So it happens that some have fallen into the philosophical view of nihilism, which is a cause of going to hell. Everything apart from the school of Tsongkhapa represents a mistaken philosophical view.

Phabongkhapa actively opposed the other schools of Tibetan Buddhism. Stephan Beyer writes:

Phabongkhapa was undoubtedly one of the great lamas of the early twentieth century, but he was a man of contradictory passions, and he shows us two different faces when he is recalled by those who knew him. In many ways, he was truly a saint; he was sent to Chamdo by the central government to represent its interests and administer its Gelug monasteries, and he was sympathetic to the concerns of the Kham people over whom he had been granted jurisdiction, a scholar and an enthusiast for all aspects of Tibetan culture. But many eastern Tibetans remember him with loathing as the great persecutor of the "ancient" sect, devoting himself to the destruction throughout Kham of images of the Precious Guru and the burning of "ancient" books and paintings.

Buddhist scholar Matthew Kapstein writes, "There has been a great deal of sectarian dispute among Tibetan refugees in India. Much of this has its roots in the works of Phabongkhapa Dechen Nyingpo (1878–1937), whose visions of the Gelugpa protective deity Dorje Shugden seem to have entailed a commitment to oppose the other schools of Tibetan Buddhism and the Bönpo."

Regarding Pabongkha Rinpoche's attitude toward the Bön, he said that "The dharmas of Bönpos, tirthikas, and so forth are non-Buddhist and should not be taken as our refuge." In his famous work Liberation in the Palm of Your Hand, he calls it an "evil system", "false dharma", "not worthy of being a refuge", "plagiarized", and "invented". Although the Bön religion was originally highly hostile to Buddhists, Phabongkhapa never advocated intolerance towards them: "Bön is not a refuge for Buddhists; it is not worthy of being a refuge. All the same, Buddhists and Bönpos say things to each other out of attachment or hostility, and this hardly makes for honest debate. You must know the sources of the Bön religion." To support his claim that Bön is not a fitting refuge for Buddhists, Phabongkhapa quoted several Buddhist scholars, including Milarepa, who said, "The source of Bön is perverted Dharma. A creation of nagas and powerful elementals, it does not take one to the ultimate path."

=== Persecution of the Rimé movement ===
David Kay notes that Shugden was a key tool in Phabongkha's persecution of the Rimé movement:

"As the Gelug agent of the Tibetan government in Kham (Eastern Tibet), and in response to the Rimé movement that had originated and was flowering in that region, The Melodious Voice of Brahma (tshangs pa'i dbyangs snyan) and his disciples employed repressive measures against non-Gelug sects. Religious artefacts associated with Padmasambhava – who is revered as a 'second Buddha' by Nyingma practitioners – were destroyed, and non-Gelug, and particularly Nyingma, monasteries were forcibly converted to the Gelug position. A key element of Phabongkha Rinpoche's outlook was the practice of the protective deity Dorje Shugden, which he married to the idea of Gelug exclusivism and employed against other traditions as well as against those within the Gelug who had eclectic tendencies."

"His teaching tour of Kham in 1938 was a seminal phase, leading to a hardening of his exclusivism and the adoption of a militantly sectarian stance. In reaction to the flourishing Rimed movement and the perceived decline of Gelug monasteries in that region, Phabongkha and his disciples spearheaded a revival movement, promoting the supremacy of the Gelug as the only pure tradition. He now regarded the inclusivism of Gelug monks who practised according to the teachings of other schools as a threat to the integrity of the Gelug tradition, and he aggressively opposed the influence of other traditions, particularly the Nyingma, whose teachings were deemed mistaken and deceptive. A key element of Phabongkha's revival movement was the practice of relying upon Dorje Shugden, the main function of the deity now being presented as 'the protection of the Gelug tradition through violent means, even including the killing of its enemies'."

The Rimé movement, composed of the Sakya, Kagyu and Nyingma schools, came about in the first place as a result of Gelug persecution.

=== Controversy ===
Joona Repo in The Treasury of Lives:

While Pabongkha has been accused of sectarianism and even of inciting sectarian violence, specifically in Kham, a number of his own students and well-known lineage descendants, while not denying that cases of sectarian persecution may have taken place, have rejected the allegations that Pabongkha was responsible for these incidents. Pabongkha's writings and accounts of his oral teachings show a unique rhetoric that both esteemed all traditions of Tibetan Buddhism, and simultaneously critiqued aspects of these (including the Gelug) which he considered degenerate. He was particularly adamant that Tsongkhapa and the Gelug tradition's understanding of Madhyamaka was exclusively correct and was critical of certain teachings from other traditions which he believed to be corrupt, such as several Nyingma treasure cycles. Pabongkha, however, reserved his strongest criticism for the Bön tradition, which he saw as a corrupt path, plagiarized from Buddhism, which did not lead to liberation. On the other hand, several works attributed to Pabongkha contain passages citing the importance of respecting all traditions of Tibetan Buddhism as well as clear statements of respect for specific religious figures from all traditions, such as Padmasambhava, the five founding figures of the Sakya tradition (sa skya gong ma rnam lnga), and Kagyu teachers such as Marpa Chokyi Lodro (mar pa chod kyi blo gros, 1002/1012–1097) and Milarepa.

=== Construction of Dorje Shugden ===
Dreyfus states that "the propitiation of Shukden as a Gelug protector is not an ancestral tradition, but a relatively recent invention of tradition associated with the revival movement within the Gelug spearheaded by Pabongkha." Pabongkha transformed Dorje Shugden's "marginal practice into a central element of the Gelug tradition," thus "replacing the protectors appointed by Tsongkhapa himself" and "replacing the traditional supra-mundane protectors of the Gelug tradition." This change is said to have been reflected in the artworks, since there is "lack of Dorje Shugden art in the Gelug school before the end of the 19th century."

Pabongkha fashioned Shugden as a violent protector of the Gelug school, who is employed against other traditions. Within the Gelug school itself, Pabongkha constructed Shugden as replacing the traditional Gelug protectors Pehar, Nechung, Palden Lhamo, Mahakala, Vaisravana and Kalarupa, who were appointed by Tsongkhapa.

The abbot of Drepung monastery and the 13th Dalai Lama were opposed to Phabongka's propititation of Shugden, resulting in an apology from Phabongka. (Note: But not everyone agreed with the decision to hold that ritual in the monastery dedicated to the guardian deity of the Dalai Lamas and the Tibetan government. Among these was the Abbot of Drepung Monastery, who immediately consulted Nechung, the State Oracle. There could not be two protectors under the same roof, wrote the abbot to His Holiness, the Thirteenth Dalai Lama. The Dalai Lama decided to have Phabongka formally rebuked by a government functionary. Then he wrote to him personally, revealing how disconcerted he was by his behavior. A few days went by, and a messenger brought Phabongka’s response to the Potala, with a gold coin and a white kata. Phabongka apologized, saying: “What I have done is unjustifiable, and in the future, as you have asked of me, I shall take your instructions to heart. I ask your forgiveness for what I have done and written.” The Dalai Lama responded to Phabongka’s apology with a second letter: There is much to be said about your words and deeds, both in logistical and doctrinal terms, but I do not want to continue on this subject. Concerning your references to the practice of the refuge, first of all, you are propitiating Shugden as a protector. And since these students now have a connection with you, the practice has notably spread at Drepung. Since the monastery was first founded by Jamyang Choejey, Nechung has been designated as guardian and protector of Drepung, and his oracle has expressed his great dissatisfaction with the abbot on several occasions, saying that appeasing Shugden has accelerated the degeneration of the Buddha’s teaching. This is the root of the problem. In particular, your search for the support of a worldly guardian to ensure benefits in this life is contrary to the principle of the taking of refuge. Therefore, it is contradictory to affirm, as you do “from the bottom of your heart,” that what happened is only the fruit of your “confusion and ignorance,” and that you were not aware of having “followed a wrongful path and led others onto it." Phabongka replied with apparent humility: "You have asked me why I am interested in this protector. I must explain that, according to my old mother, Shugden was a guardian for my family from the start, and that is why I have honored him. But now I want to say that I have repented and I have understood my mistake. I shall perform purification and promise with all my heart that in the future I will avoid propitiating, praying to, and making daily offerings [to Shugden]. I admit to all the errors I have made, disturbing Nechung and contradicting the principle of the refuge, and I beg you, in your great, heartfelt compassion, to forgive me and purify my actions.)

== Death ==
When Phabongkhapa died, an elaborate reliquary was constructed, but the Chinese demolished it. Rilbur Rinpoche managed to retrieve some of his cremation relics ("ring sel") from it, which are usually kept at Sera Monastery. They are on the relics tour of Lama Zopa.

== Sources ==
=== Secondary sources ===
- Beyer, Stephan (1978). The Cult of Tara: Magic and Ritual in Tibet. University of California Press. ISBN 9780520036352.
- Bultrini, Raimondo (2013). The Dalai Lama and the King Demon: Tracking a Triple Murder Mystery Through the Mists of Time. New York: Tibet House. ISBN 978-0-9670115-23.
- Daisley, Simon F.S. (2012). Exorcising Luther: Confronting the demon of modernity in Tibetan Buddhism (PDF) (MA). Christchurch: University of Canterbury. OCLC 837349621.
- Dreyfus, Georges (1998). "The Shuk-Den Affair: Origins of a Controversy". Journal of the International Association of Buddhist Studies. 21 (2 (1998)). IABS: 227–270.
- Kay, David N. (2004). Tibetan and Zen Buddhism in Britain: Transplantation, development and adaptation. London: Routledge Curzon. ISBN 0-415-29765-6.
- Repo, Joona (2015). "Phabongkha Dechen Nyingpo: His Collected Works and the Guru-Deity-Protector Triad" (PDF). Revue d'Études Tibétaines (33 (Oct. 2015)): 5–71.
- Repo, Joona (2015). "The Second Pabongkha, Dechen Nyingpo". The Treasury of Lives. NY.
- Kay, David N. (1997). "The New Kadampa Tradition and the Continuity of Tibetan Buddhism in Transition" (PDF). Journal of Contemporary Religion. 12 (3). Routledge: 277–293. doi:10.1080/13537909708580806.

=== Primary sources ===
- Pabongka Rinpoche (1997). Trijang Rinpoche (ed.). Liberation in the Palm of Your Hand: A Concise Discourse on the Path to Enlightenment by Pabongka. Spiritual Classics. Michael Richards (trans.) (2 ed.). Boston: Wisdom Publications. ISBN 0861711262. OCLC 36824856.
- Rilbur Rinpoche (1997). "Pabongka Rinpoche: A Memoir by Rilbur Rinpoche". Liberation in the Palm of Your Hand: A Concise Discourse on the Path to Enlightment by Pabongka. Michael Richards (trans.). Wisdom Publications. pp. xiii–xvii. ISBN 0861711262. OCLC 36824856.
