= National anthem of Tibet =

Anthem of the Tibetan Government in Exile

Gyallu
- བོད་རྒྱལ་ཁབ་ཆེན་པོའི་རྒྱལ་གླུ།
- National anthem of Tibet
- Lyrics: Trijang Rinpoche, 1950
- Adopted: 1950

Audio sample
- file; help

Instrumental recording of the anthem (Composed in MIDI)

The national anthem of Tibet (Classical Tibetan: བོད་རྒྱལ་ཁབ་ཆེན་པོའི་རྒྱལ་གླུ།, Wylie: bod rgyal khab kyi rgyal glu), commonly referred to as "Gyallu", is a Tibetan patriotic song which serves as the de facto anthem of the Central Tibetan Administration.

It is unclear exactly whether it was first used before the Annexation of Tibet by the People's Republic of China in 1951, or after the 14th Dalai Lama went into exile in India in 1960. The earliest report of a state anthem (presumably "Gyallu") is between 1949 and 1950 when Tibet was under invasion. It was introduced under reforms set in place to strengthen patriotism among the Tibetan people. Another report states that the anthem was presented to the 14th Dalai Lama in exile in 1960.

Like "Qurtulush Yolida", performance of this anthem is strictly prohibited by the People's Republic of China, particularly in the Tibet Autonomous Region.

Tibet's first national anthem was, according to Tashi Tsering, written by a Tibetan scholar during the epoch of the 7th Dalai Lama and under the reign of the Pholanas in between 1745 and 1746.

== Lyrics ==
Written by Trijang Rinpoche, a tutor of the 14th Dalai Lama, around 1950, the lyrics focus on the radiance of the Gautama Buddha.

The melody is said to be based on a very old piece of Tibetan sacred music, and some of its elements are also found in other Tibetan songs such as that of Mimang Langlu, a song of the 1959 Tibetan uprising. It has been used by Tibetans in exile ever since the introduction of the state anthem although it is banned in Tibet.

=== Current lyrics ===
Standard Tibetan original	English translation	
སྲིད་ཞིའི་ཕན་བདེའི་འདོད་རྒུ་འབྱུང་བའི་གཏེར། ཐུབ་བསྟན་བསམ་འཕེལ་ནོར་བུའི་འོད་སྣང་འབར། བསྟན་འགྲོའི་ནོར་འཛིན་རྒྱ་ཆེར་སྐྱོང་བའི་མགོན། འཕྲིན་ལས་ཀྱི་རོལ་མཚོ་རྒྱས། རྡོ་རྗེའི་ཁམས་སུ་བརྟན་པས་ཕྱོགས་ཀུན་བྱམས་བརྩེས་སྐྱོང། གནམ་བསྐོས་དགའ་བ་བརྒྱ་ལྡན་དབུ་འཕང་དགུང་ལ་རེག ཕུན་ཚོགས་སྡེ་བཞིའི་མངའ་ཐང་རྒྱས། བོད་ལྗོངས་ཆོལ་ཁ་གསུམ་གྱི་ཁྱོན་ལ་བདེ་སྐྱིད་རྫོགས་ལྡན་གསར་པས་ཁྱབ། ཆོས་སྲིད་ཀྱི་དཔལ་ཡོན་དར། ཐུབ་བསྟན་ཕྱོགས་བཅུར་རྒྱས་པས་འཛམ་གླིང་ཡངས་པའི་ སྐྱེ་རྒུ་ཞི་བདེའི་དཔལ་ལ་སྦྱོར། བོད་ལྗོངས་བསྟན་འགྲོའི་དགེ་མཚན་ཉི་འོད་ཀྱིས། བཀྲ་ཤིས་འོད་སྣང་འབུམ་དུ་འཕྲོ་བའི་གཟིས། ནག་ཕྱོགས་མུན་པའི་གཡུལ་ལས་རྒྱལ་གྱུར་ཅིག།	The source of temporal and spiritual wealth of joy and boundless benefits The Wish-fulfilling Jewel of the Buddha's Teaching, blazes forth radiant light The all-protecting Patron of the Doctrine and of all sentient beings By his actions stretches forth his influence like an ocean By his eternal Vajra-nature; His compassion and loving care extend to beings everywhere May the celestially appointed Government of Gawa Gyaden achieve the heights of glory And increase its fourfold influence and prosperity May a golden age of joy and happiness spread once more through these regions of Tibet; And may its temporal and spiritual splendour shine again May the Buddha's Teaching spread in all the ten directions and lead all beings in the universe to glorious peace May the spiritual Sun of the Tibetan faith and People; Emitting countless rays of auspicious light Victoriously dispel the strife of darkness	
Wylie transliteration	Tibetan pinyin (Note: Tibetan pinyin is the official romanization. See also Tibetan pinyin#Single syllable orthography and Tibetan script#Romanization and transliteration.)	IPA transcription (Note: See Help:IPA/Tibetan and Tibetan phonology.)
srid zhi'i phan bde'i 'dod rgu 'byung ba'i gter, thub bstan bsam 'phel nor bu'i 'od snang 'bar. bstan 'gro'i nor 'dzin rgya cher skyong ba'i mgon 'phrin las kyi rol mtsho rgyas. rdo rje'i khams su brtan pas phyogs kun byams brtses skyong, gnam bskos dga' ba brgya ldan dbu 'phang dgung la reg phun tshogs sde bzhi'i mnga' thang rgyas bod ljongs chol kha gsum gyi khyon la bde skyid rdzogs ldan gsar pas khyab chos srid kyi dpal yon dar thub bstan phyogs bcur rgyas pas 'dzam gling yangs pa'i skye rgu zhi bde'i dpal la sbyor. bod ljongs bstan 'gro'i dge mtshan nyi 'od kyis bkra shis 'od snang 'bum du 'phro ba'i gzis, nag phyogs mun pa'i g.yul las rgyal gyur cig.	Sixi pende dögu jungwai der, Tubdän sampel norpui önang bar. Denzhö norzin gyaqer kyongwai gön, Chinlä kyi rolco gyä, Dorje kamsu denbä, Qogün qamze gyong, Namgö gawa gyadän, u-pang gungla reg Pünzog dexi nga-tang gyä Pöjong jölka, sumkyi kyönla degyi zogdän sarbä kyab Qösi gyi bälyon tar Tubdän qog jur gyäbä zamling yangbai Gyegu xide bälla jor. Pöjong dänzhoi gecän nyi-ö-gyi Zhaxi Önang bumtu Chowai si, Nagqog münbai yül lä, gyäl kyur Qig.	[síʔ.ʑìː pʰɛ̃́.dèː ⁿdø̀ʔ.ɡù ᶮdʑùŋ.wɛ̀ː téɾ |] [tʰú(p̚).tɛ̃́ sám.pʰél nòɾ.pʰỳː ʔ̞ø̀ʔ.náŋ ᵐbàɾ ǁ] [tɛ̃́.ᶯʈʂø̀ː nòɾ.ⁿtsĩ̀ː ɟà.tɕʰéɾ cóŋ.wɛ̀ː ᵑɡø̃̀ |] [ʈʂʰĩ́.lɛ̀ʔ cí | ɾʲòɫ.tsʰó cɛ̀ʔ |] [dòɾ.dʑèː kʰám.sú tɛ́m.pɛ́ʔ | tɕʰóʔ.kỹ́ tɕʰàm.tséʔ ɟóŋ |] [nám.kǿʔ ɡàʔ.wà ɟà.ⁿdɛ̃̀ | (w)ùʔ.pʰáŋ ɡùŋ.là ɾèʔ |] [pʰỹ́.tsóʔ dè.ʑìː ŋá.tʰáŋ ɟɛ̀ʔ |] [pʰøʔ.ᶮdʑòŋ tɕʰǿl.kʰá súm.cʰì cʰø̃́.là |] [dè.ɟíʔ dzòʔ.dɛ̃̀ sáɾ.pɛ́ʔ cʰá(p̚) ǁ] [tɕʰǿʔ.síʔ.cí pɛ́l.jõ̀ tʰàɾ | tʰú(p̚).tɛ̃́ tɕʰóʔ.tɕúɾ ɟɛ̀.pɛ́] [dzàm.líŋ jàŋ.pɛ́ː cé.gù ʑè.dèː pɛ́l.là dʑòɾ ǁ] [pʰøʔ.ᶮdʑòŋ tɛ̃́.ᶯʈʂø̀ː ɡè.tsʰɛ̃́ ɲì.ʔ̞ø̀ʔ.cí |] [ʈʂá.ɕí ʔ̞ø̀ʔ.náŋ ᵐbùm.tʰù ʈʂʰó.wɛ̀ː zìʔ |] [nàʔ.tɕʰóʔ mỹ̀.pɛ́ː jýl lɛ̀ʔ | ɟɛ̀l.cʰùɾ tɕíʔ ǁ]

=== Original version ===
The first Tibetan national anthem was created in the 18th century. According to eminent Tibetan scholar Tashi Tsering, it was composed by Pholanas around 1745, at the time of the 7th Dalai Lama. Sir Charles Bell described it as Tibet's "national hymn".

Tibetan original

གངས་རིས་སྐོར་བའི་ཞིང་ཁམས་འདི།
ཕན་ཐང་བདེ་བ་མ་ལུས་འབྱུང་བའི་གནས་།
སྤྱན་རས་གཟིགས་བ་བསྟན་འཛིན་རྒྱ་མཚོ་ཡིན།
ཞབས་པད་སྲིད་མཐའི་བར་དུ་བརྟན་གྱུར་ཅིག་།།

Wylie transliteration

Gangs ris skor ba'i zhing khams 'di
Phan thang bde ba ma lus 'byung ba'i gnas
Spyan ras gzigs ba bstan 'dzin rgya mtsho yin
Zhabs pad srid mtha'i bar du brtan gyur cig.

Tibetan pinyin (Note: Tibetan pinyin is the official romanization. See also Tibetan pinyin#Single syllable orthography and Tibetan script#Romanization and transliteration.)

Kang ri kor wai shingkam di
Pän tang tewa ma lü jungwai nä
Qänräzig wa Tänzin gyaco yin
Shapä sä dai bardu tän gyur qig.

English translation

Circled by ramparts of snow-mountains,
This sacred realm, this wellspring of all benefits and happiness.
Tenzin Gyatso, the enlighted existence of compassion,
May his reign endure till the end of all existence.
