= Robert Barnett =

Robert Barnett may refer to:

- Robert Barnett (lawyer) (1946–2025), American lawyer
- Robert Barnett (scholar) (born 1953), British scholar of Tibet
- Robert S. Barnett (1950–2004), Pennsylvania politician
- Bobby Barnett (musician), see 1968 in country music
- Bobby Barnett (horse trainer), in Super Derby
- Bobby Barnett (American football), see List of Buffalo Bills players
- Bob Barnett, fictional character from Home and Away
- T-Mo (born 1972), American rapper, born Robert Barnett
- Robby Barnett, American choreographer
