= Trijang Chocktrul Rinpoche =

Kyabje Trijang Chocktrul Rinpoche
- Tibetan: སྐྱབས་རྗེ་ཁྲི་བྱང་མཆོག་སྤྲུལ་རིན་པོ་ཆེ་; Wylie: skyabs rje khri byang mchog sprul rin po che

Tulku of the third Trijang Rinpoche
- Preceded by: Trijang Rinpoche, Lobsang Yeshe Tenzin Gyatso

Personal details
- Born: 15 October 1982 (age 42)

Kyabje Trijang Chocktrul Rinpoche (born October 15, 1982) is the current tulku of the third Trijang Rinpoche, and succeeded Trijang Lobsang Yeshe Tenzin Gyatso. Rinpoche is the current principal throne holder of Shar Gaden Monastic University in South India, Karnataka, and the spiritual director of the Trijang Buddhist Institute in Northfield, Vermont.

The search for the reincarnation began on January 31, 1984. Shartse Abbot Lati Rinpoche, Jangchup Tsultim, Phukhang Geshe Tashi Norbu, Ngakre Phuntsok Tsultim, and Kungo Palden traveled throughout India and Nepal searching for the true reincarnation. They assembled 544 candidates and from them ninety nine were selected from after further screening. Among the 99, there were eight that were very special and those names were presented to the Dalai Lama. On December 24, 1984, the Dalai Lama divined in front of the holy relics of Kyabje Trijang Rinpoche’s relics in Mundgod, South India, and showed that Tsering Gyurme (Rinpoche’s birth name), son of Sonam Topgyal and Lobsang Drolma was the true reincarnation. On April 22, 1985, the Dalai Lama conducted another divination alongside Shartse Abbot Lati Rinpoche and Kungo Palden and confirmed that the son of Sonam Topgyal and Lobsang Drolma is Gyatso's reincarnation. The news was broadcast on the Tibetan language channel of All India Radio. The first audience of Rinpoche happened on July 1, 1986, during the hair-cutting ceremony. On July 14, 1986, he was enthroned at the Ganden Shartse Monastery.

Rinpoche established the Trijang Buddhist Institute in the city of Northfield, Vermont, in the United States and presently serves as its spiritual director. The Trijang Buddhist Institute provides a public programme of meditations; pujas; teachings by Geshe Cheme, Geshe Sopa and Tharchen Lobsang; and Tibetan language lessons.
