= Trijang Lobsang Yeshe Tenzin Gyatso =

Tibetan Gelugpa lama (1901–1981)

Kyabje Trjang Rinpoche (1901-1981)

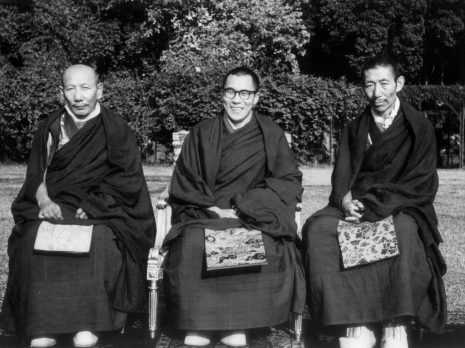
Ling Rinpoche, the Dalai Lama and Trijang Rinpoche at Hyderabad House, N.Delhi. 1956

The Third Trijang Rinpoche, Lobsang Yeshe Tenzin Gyatso (1901–1981) was a Gelugpa Lama and a direct disciple of Pabongkhapa Déchen Nyingpo. He succeeded Ling Rinpoche as the junior tutor of the 14th Dalai Lama when the Dalai Lama was nineteen years old. He was also a lama of many Gelug lamas who taught in the West including Zong Rinpoche, Geshe Rabten, Lama Yeshe, Kelsang Gyatso, and Lama Zopa Rinpoche. Trijang Rinpoche's oral teachings were recorded by Zimey Rinpoche in a book called the Yellow Book.

== Birth and early life ==
Trijang Rinpoche's father, Tserin Dondrub, was descended from the uncle of the 7th Dalai Lama, and was knowledgeable in religion. His mother, Tsering Drolma, came from the village of Gungtang Nanggong. Trijang Rinpoche was born in Gungtang in the winter of 1901, the "Year of Increase" or the "Iron Bull year". Allegedly, an apricot tree flowered and had 30 apricots at his birth even though it was deep winter. According to A Short Biography of Trijang Rinpoche, by Lobsang Palden Tenzin Yargye, before Trijang could walk he showed great interest in religious paintings, statues, and Tantric ritual implements; and would make as if he was reciting prayers. When news of his precocious actions reached Ngarampa Losang Tendar and Geshe Gendun Dragpa Chen, who were responsible for finding the reincarnation of Losang Tsultrim Palden, who was the Ganden Tripa and former Trijang Rinpoche, they travelled to his birthplace of Gungtang. When the child saw them, he yelled out: "Gendun Dragpa!" and later asked him to wash his feet. Gendun Dragpa used to wash the feet of Losang Tsultrim Palden when he had rheumatism. The child also correctly identified the former Trijang Rinpoche's private Buddha statue, rosary and bowl from among a selection. This and other signs led the search party to conclude that they had probably found the correct incarnation. Upon being given a list of names of several boys who had shown encouraging signs, the 13th Dalai Lama said:

"It would be best to recognize the boy born to the Gungtang girl Tsering Drolma in the Iron Bull year as the reincarnation of the former occupant of the Ganden throne."

He was invited by the 13th Dalai Lama to the Lhasa Trijang residence in 1904, at the age of 3.

== Meeting his spiritual guide ==
In 1906, aged 5, he moved to the Trijang Residence at Chusang Ritroe, where he met Pabongkhapa Déchen Nyingpo. From him he received his first teaching, Set of Initiations into Manjushri from the Secret Lineage of Tsongkhapa.

== Receiving ordination, teachings, and Tantric initiations ==
In 1907, aged 6, he went to Gepel Ling at Reting Monastery, the birthplace of the Kadam teachings of Dromtön in the 10th century. There he took the five upāsaka and the ten śrāmaṇera vows of the prātimokṣa, receiving the name Losang Yeshe Tenzin Gyatso Pelsangpo. He then memorized many Buddhist texts, including over half of Candrakīrti's Madhyamakāvatāra, and analyzed their meaning. Later that year he visited Ganden Monastery and was received by the Shartse and Jangste abbots, whom he apparently recognized, along with the main temple, without introduction.

He spent the next 12 years studying the classical texts for the geshe degree—Pramanavartika, Madhyamaka, Prajnaparamita, Vinaya and Abhidharma-kośa—principally according to the textbooks by Panchen Sonam Dragpa. He also studied the collected works of Je Tsongkhapa, the 1st Dalai Lama, and the Panchen Lama Chokyi Gyaltsen. In 1908, he received Kalachakra initiation from Serkong Rinpoche, as well as empowerments into Manjusri, Avalokiteśvara and Vajrapani. Later he received empowerments of Guhyasamāja, Yamantaka, Heruka and Vajrayogini. He also continued to receive instructions and initiations from Pabongka Rinpoche, including the Collected Works of Gyalwa Ensapa, the Collected Works of Panchen Chokyi Gyaltsen, and a Guru yoga of Je Tsongkhapa called Ganden Lha Gya Ma ("Hundreds of Deities of the Joyful Land"). He received the "Empowerment into the Six Ways to Revolve the Chakras of Heruka" (including the full initiation costume of bone ornaments) as well as all the Action Tantra empowerments from Khyenrab Yonten Gyatso, the 88th Ganden Tripa, in 1915, aged 14. In 1916, aged 15, he studied the complete Tibetan grammar and from then on composed thousands of acrostic verses, such as:

Ah Friends! While the spittle drools from the Death Lord's smile

Bleaching your head as white as falling snow

Could this tedious life yield aught but chaff?

Dharma from my Guru is what I'll practice!

He also composed chants for spiritual practices and ceremonies and scores for their music for use by Ganden Shartse monastery.

In 1919, aged 18, he debated before the geshes of the three major Gelug monasteries for his final examination. The 13th Dalai Lama awarded him third place, and he received the highest geshe degree, the Lharampa.

Shortly afterward he received the 253 ordination vows of a fully ordained monk from the 13th Dalai Lama. He was admitted to the Upper Tantric College, Gyuto, in 1919, where he studied the Root Tantra of Heruka and its commentary by Je Tsongkhapa, Illuminating all Hidden Meanings (Wylie: sbas don kun sel).

From the ages of 20 to 22 Trijang Rinpoche received many teachings and empowerments from his root Guru Pabongkhapa, including the initiation into the sindhura mandala of Vajrayogini according to Naropa, the Heruka body mandala empowerment according to Ghantapa, teachings on Lama Chopa (Offering to the Spiritual Guide), Gelug mahamudra, the Lamrim Chenmo (great stages of the path) by Je Tsongkhapa and Seven Points of Training the Mind by Chekawa Yeshe Dorje.

== Early meditation retreats ==
After being at the Tantric College for one year, he went to Chatreng in Kham province where he listened to more teachings. He also did his preliminary practices (Tib. ngon dro) of purifying the mind and accumulating merit in conjunction with Lama Chopa; and he meditated on Lamrim and Lojong (training the mind).

== Giving teachings and initiations ==
In 1924, when he was 23, Geshe Yonten of Ganden Shartse College requested him to teach. He gave the oral transmission of the Collected Works of Je Tsongkhapa and His Main Disciples to about 200 monks, followed later by granting the empowerment of Vajrayogini according to Naropa to about 60 Lamas, incarnate lamas and monks. He was then invited by Artog Tulku of Sera Je Monastery to give empowerments of Heruka Five Deities and Hayagriva to about 200 people. In Chatreng, aged 24, he taught Lamrim to 2,000 monks and lay people and gave Avalokiteshvara empowerment. He also taught extensively on the practice of Guru Puja (Lama Chopa). He then received an invitation to give empowerments of Guhyasamaja, Avalokiteshvara and Vajrayogini at Gangkar Monastery.

From the ages of 24 to 27, he travelled and taught extensively at many Gelugpa places of learning all over Tibet. He also taught at Sakyapa and Nyingmapa Centers at their request. He travelled west and gave Avalokiteshvara empowerment and teachings on Lamrim to about 3,000 monks at Jampa Ling monastery in Litang, as well as most of the local people. In the foothills of Kambo, a place sacred to Chakrasamvara, he granted initiation and led a long retreat.

In 1928, aged 27, he returned to Chatreng, and was invited by the Tantrists of Chagra Gang to give initiations into the Peaceful Form of Padmasambhava and the Six Forms of Padmasambhava According to the Old Concealed Texts. He also encouraged and helped them to repair the Chagra temple.

On his return to Lhasa later that year, he continued to visit monasteries to grant initiations and teachings, including the valleys and plains of Gyaltang. According to the author of Gangkar Rinpoche's secret biography, Gangkar Rinpoche at this time had a vision of Trijang Rinpoche as being the reincarnation of Padmasambhava; and he performed ceremonies in his honor and presented a large number of offerings, including a sacred Heruka statue.

When he reached Lhasa he had audiences with the 13th Dalai Lama and Pabongka Rinpoche and made offerings of silver coins, grain and tea to all the monks of Ganden. He also set up a fund for the monks. The following year, aged 28, he also donated gifts to all those attending Monlam, the Great Prayer Festival, and made many offerings to the Tantric colleges.

During the next few years, until 1932, he received teachings from Pabongka Rinpoche, including the oral instructions of many secret Gelugpa lineages, and he also engaged in Tantric retreats. In 1932 he gave more extensive teachings at Ganden Shartse and Jangste monasteries.

In 1933, the 13th Dalai Lama died, and Trijang Rinpoche helped Ling Rinpoche and other lamas from Sera monastery and Namgyal monastery consecrate the body and the reliquary. In 1936, aged 35, he granted Heruka empowerment to the monks of Ganden monastery and then made a tour of the southern district of Tibet to make offerings and give teachings. He also continued to receive instructions from Pabongka Rinpoche and made extensive offerings to Shartse and Jangtse colleges at Ganden.

After attending Je Phabongkhapa's teachings on Lamrim Chenmo at Ganden monastery, in 1939 Trijang Rinpoche toured pilgrimage sites in India and Nepal, making extensive offerings at each place. He then went to give teachings and empowerments on Heruka, Guhyasamaja, Yamantaka, Vajrayogini and Guru Puja at Dungkar Monastery in Dromo, and on his return he visited important sites in Tsang, including Tashi Lhunpo Monastery. In 1940 he taught the Guru Puja and Gelugpa Mahamudra to senior monks of Ganden Jangtse. In 1941 he continued to receive teachings from Je Phabongkhapa.

He also taught the 14th Dalai Lama extensively as his Junior Tutor (see below).

From 1960 onward, while in exile in India, he continued to teach and initiate the Dalai Lama and many other disciples, including granting Vajrayogini empowerment in Dharamsala, and many teachings and empowerments at the newly located monasteries in Buxa, the Tantric colleges in Dalhousie, and a Tibetan monastery in Varanasi. In 1967 he taught Hundreds of Deities of the Joyful Land (the Guru yoga of Je Tsongkhapa according to the Segyu lineage) to hundreds of students in Dharamsala, and in 1970 he gave similar teachings in Bodh Gaya. In 1969, he gave the major empowerment of Heruka according to Luipa to around 1,000 people at the request of the Tantric colleges. In the fall of 1971, he visited Mysore in the south of India at the request of the monks of the three major monasteries who had settled in the Tibetan camp at Mundgod, and gave extensive teachings and initiations to the monks and to lay people, and ordained hundreds of young monks. At that time he also made offerings to the Sangha and donated statues of Je Tsongkhapa and his Two Sons to the main temple of Ganden, along with tangkhas. In 1972 he gave Vajrayogini empowerment and teachings in Dharamsala to 800 monastics and lay people and in Bodhgaya. Later that year he taught at the Tibetan Studies Institute in Varanasi, and the following year he gave empowerments into Heruka and Vajrayogini to 700 people at the Tibetan monastery there.

He and the senior tutor Ling Rinpoche would also exchange teachings and initiations. In 1969 he taught Ling Rinpoche the Lamrim Chenmo, and in 1970 he granted him Yamantaka empowerment. In return, in 1970 he received from Ling Rinpoche the Action Tantra empowerment of Vairochana and also teachings on Lamrim Chenmo. In 1972 he gave Ling Rinpoche teachings on the Guru Puja and Yamantaka, and in return received a teaching on tormas (ritual offerings) to Yamantaka.

Although respected by lamas in all Tibetan Buddhist schools, and invited by them to give teachings and initiations, Trijang Rinpoche taught primarily from the Gelugpa tradition of Je Tsongkhapa. He was also the holder of the Ganden, or Geden, Oral Tradition that was passed to him in its entirety by his root guru Pabongka Rinpoche. According to Helmut Gassner, the Dalai Lama's translator for 17 years and one of only two ordained Western Geshes:

The great master Pabongka was in the first half of the twentieth century the pivotal or key lineage holder of the Oral Geden Tradition. Many other teachers before him mastered certain aspects of the tradition's teachings, but it was Pabongka Rinpoche's particular merit to locate and find all these partial transmissions, to learn and realize them, and bring them together once again to pass them on through a single person. In his lifetime there was hardly a significant figure of the Geden tradition who had not been Pabongka Rinpoche's disciple. Kyabje Trijang Rinpoche was the one capable of receiving and passing on the entirety of the Oral Geden Tradition once again. The Dorje Shugden practice is an integral part of that tradition.

== Other work ==
=== Liberation in the Palm of Your Hand ===
In 1921, when Trijang Dorjechang was 21, Pabongka Rinpoche was invited to Chuzang Hermitage, near Lhasa, to teach the Lamrim Chenmo, the Great Stages of the Path to Enlightenment, which he did over a twenty-four days period to over 2000 monks and many lay people. During that time, Je Phabongkhapa asked his chief disciple Trijang Rinpoche to publish a book based on the notes he took during the teachings. Later, Trijang Rinpoche was responsible for publishing this classic Lam Rim text by his root Guru, Pabongka Rinpoche, which is entitled Liberation in the Palm of Your Hand.

=== Other texts ===
Trijang Rinpoche also authored other Buddhist texts. In 1967, aged 66, he composed an elaborate set of headings for the Small and Medium Stages of the Path to Enlightenment (Lam Rim). He also composed, amongst a great deal of other material:

- Liberation for Your Safekeeping, a composition from notes on Pabongka Rinpoche's discourses on Lam Rim (which is included among the Collected Works of Je Pabongka).
- The Body Mandala of Shri Chakrasamvara According to Ghantapada
- A long consecration ceremony related to both Heruka and Guhyasamaja for the Upper Tantric College
- A set of initiations into Chittamani Tara
- A complete set of examples of the points of grammar, in verse form
- A table of contents for the works of Chatreng Jampa
- Various biographies
- Various rituals, prayers and supplications, including for the reincarnation of various Lamas
- A set of initiations into White Tara
- A set of initiations into the Protector Deity Dorje Shugden

=== Tutor to the 14th Dalai Lama ===
In 1941, Trijang Rinpoche was appointed Assistant Tutor to the 14th Dalai Lama, and thereafter helped the Senior Tutor Ling Rinpoche in educating him, initially teaching him how to read and memorize texts to be recited. The 14th Dalai Lama describes Trijang Rinpoche as his "root Guru" in two of his books.

In 1941 Trijang Rinpoche also received the news that his Spiritual Guide Je Phabongkhapa had died. This made him immeasurably sad and he made many prayers and offerings. In 1942, he was one of the Dalai Lama's ordaining monks (and later in 1954 he acted as the so-called "inquisitor into the secrets" when the Dalai Lama took full ordination). In 1947 he began the Dalai Lama's dialectics and logical trainings (finishing in 1959 by conducting the Dalai Lama's final oral examination during the Prayer Festival), and took him on an extensive tour of Drepung and Sera monasteries to install him on the various thrones he occupies at these monasteries. In 1950, the Chinese communists entered the Chamdo region by way of Kham and as a result Trijang Rinpoche accompanied the Dalai Lama, in his spiritual and temporal capacities, to Dromo, where he gave more teachings on Lamrim. In 1954 he accompanied the Dalai Lama to Ganden, and then to Beijing via Kongpo, Powo, Chamdo etc. In 1956 he accompanied the Dalai Lama and the Panchen Lama on a pilgrimage to India. In 1960 and 1961, after he and the Dalai Lama had fled to India, he gave the Dalai Lama the major empowerments of Heruka Five Deities according to Ghantapa, Vajrayogini according to Naropa, and other initiations. In 1962 he gave him the empowerment of the Body Mandala of Heruka and taught generation stage and completion stage of this Tantra. In 1963, he gave the Dalai Lama the complete oral transmission of the Collected Works of Je Tsongkhapa, plus discourses on the Guru Puja, Gelugpa Mahamudra and Yamantaka Tantra. In 1964, he taught the Dalai Lama the Lamrim Chenmo and the 800-verse Prajnaparamita Sutra, and in 1966 he gave the Dalai Lama the oral transmission of the Collected Works of Gyaltsabje and Khedrubje (Je Tsongkhapa's two principal disciples). In Spring of 1970 he taught the Dalai Lama the generation and completion stages of Chittamani Tara and of Vajrayogini according to Naropa, and gave him empowerments into the 16 Droplets of the Kadampas. Later that year he gave many long-life empowerments to the Dalai Lama, along with initiation of Guhyasamaja and teachings on Wheel of Sharp Weapons and Lojong (training the mind), and major empowerments into 62 Deity Heruka according to Luipa. There were also 700 other students present, with the members of the Upper and Lower Tantric colleges in the front rows.

According to Helmut Gassner, translator for the 14th Dalai Lama for 17 years:

During those years I frequently accompanied Geshe Rabten on his trips and had the opportunity to meet many important personages, among them Kyabje Trijang Rinpoche, the Junior Tutor of His Holiness the Dalai Lama. Trijang Rinpoche was in many ways one of the most important figures of his time. In the fifties he was the power behind His Holiness, a pillar of strength in the difficult and troubled times for the Tibetan people. This fact was well known to the Communist Chinese and so Trijang Lobsang Yeshe became their main enemy. It was also Trijang Rinpoche who taught His Holiness the Dalai Lama the concepts of Buddhism as well as the understanding of politics and mastering social skills.

While helping in the full education the Dalai Lama, he also always continued to teach and give empowerments to larger and larger numbers of monks at the Tantric colleges, Tashi Lhunpo, Ganden, Sera, Namgyal and elsewhere.

According to many disciples:

He was the most outstanding Master in every field of Buddhist teachings as well as Tibetan culture. He was the very source of all the fields of knowledge and a consultant in all of them. It was a well-known fact that he had really been the very epitome of a Master who had attained the highest realizations of the Sutras and Tantras, as well as an unsurpassable propagator.

== Disciples ==
Trijang Rinpoche had many well known disciples, some of whom have become renowned in the West, such as Tenzin Gyatso (the 14th Dalai Lama), Lama Yeshe, Lama Gangchen Rinpoche, Geshe Rabten, Lama Zopa Rinpoche and Kelsang Gyatso. Trijang Rinpoche was the Dalai Lama's teacher until he died. As such, he taught the Dalai Lama from the elementary level up to the highest Tantric transmissions. The Dalai Lama has described him in various books, saying of him that he was his spiritual guide, and:

These two (Ling Rinpoche and Trijang Rinpoche) remained my tutors until the end of my formal education, and I continually received numerous lineages of the Tibetan Buddhist heritage from both of them. They were close friends but very different characters.... Trijang Rinpoche was a tall, thin man of great grace and elegance with a rather pointed nose for a Tibetan. He was gentle and had a deep voice, which was particularly melodious when he chanted.... Trijang Rinpoche was one of the greatest poets of his generation, with an eclectic command of art and literature."

According to Gonsar Rinpoche, "It was Kyabje Trijang Dorje Chang who offered His Holiness the most important transmissions of Dharma such as the Great Lamrim (Tib. Lamrim Chenmo), the Chakrasamvara Tantra and many hundreds of various initiations and special instructions. He also helped His Holiness in his younger age to compose texts, prepare speeches, etc."

Trijang Rinpoche's disciples consider him to be in the same mental continuum as Atisha, and the lineage holder of all the essential Gelugpa lineages of Lamrim, Lojong and Mahamudra. According to Gonsar Rinpoche, his "compassion and wisdom and the service rendered to the Dharma and sentient beings were absolutely unsurpassable."

Trijang Rinpoche also had many other less well known disciples and was an object of pilgrimage first in Tibet and later in Dharamsala and Mundgod in India:

Almost every Tibetan sought his guidance and blessings in almost all situations and activities, and that includes great masters, senior and junior rinpoches, Geshes, monks, nuns, ministers, business people, men, women, old and young, poor and rich, intellectuals or practitioners. Tibetans from practically every walk of life sought his help and advice in their good and bad times. He cared for everyone equally, without discrimination, with boundless compassion and patience.

== Bringing Buddhism to the West ==
Trijang Rinpoche had seminal and far-reaching influence on Tibetan Buddhism integrating into the West. The FPMT website states, "The spreading of Dharma in the West is directly and indirectly connected with Trijang Rinpoche, due to his own teachings, as well as the activities of his disciples, including Lama Yeshe, Kelsang Gyatso, Lama Zopa Rinpoche, Geshe Rabten, Kyabje Zong Rinpoche and many others." Towards the end of his life he had many Western disciples himself and there are many thousands more who, though they have not met him personally, are still following his teachings through the teachings they have received from their own teachers, his disciples. In the Fall of 1966 he was invited to the West and visited Switzerland for medical treatment; then he visited Germany, England, France and so on, wherever Tibetans lived, giving teachings on tour. He was invited back to Switzerland in 1968 to consecrate a new Tibetan monastery, and travelled there with Kyabje Ling Rinpoche, and this was followed by another Western tour, returning to India in the Spring of 1969.

He encouraged Geshe Rabten, Geshe Kelsang Gyatso, and many other of his closest disciples to bring Je Tsongkhapa's Dharma to Westerners, pointing out that "such efforts are never in vain, but are an important contribution to the Dharma and the well being of sentient beings." Talking about Geshe Rabten, Gonsar Rinpoche explains: "Geshe's principal spiritual father, His Holiness Kyabje Trijang Dorje Chang, whose advice was always the conclusive factor in Geshe's decisions, supported Geshe's teachings to Westerners from the very beginning." Despite his Tibetan background, Kyabje Trijang Dorjechang believed in Westerners' ability to gain deep experience of Buddha's Sutras and Tantras within their own countries and cultures, and encouraged his close disciples to "give to those who were mature some Tantric teachings and inititations on top of the essential Dharma teachings like Lamrim (the graduated path to enlightenment), Lojong (training of the mind) and great philosophical treatises."

Trijang Rinpoche was also the first Tibetan master to meet a Pontifax of Rome, when he met Pope Paul the Sixth in 1963. According to his autobiography, this was the reply of Pope Paul to his request:

I am very pleased with the greetings from the Dalai Lama. I too am taking interest in responsibility in the Dalai Lama and about Tibet. What are the helps that you need? Isn't there anything that we can help you personally with?

To which, Kyabje Trijang Rinpoche replied:

I personally have no help to request. There are a great number of us, Tibetan religious practitioners, now in exile. I would like to urge Your Holiness to bear in mind whatever help you may reasonably extend to them in terms of food and other necessary aid.

== His work for Tibetans in exile ==
Shortly after the Dalai Lama's final examinations in 1959, he and the Dalai Lama left the Norbulingka Palace in Lhasa and travelled to India because of widespread fears that the PRC were planning on abducting the Dalai Lama. According to Trijang Rinpoche's disciples:

Not only did he offer to His Holiness studies from the elementary level up to the highest Tantric transmissions, he was also the backbone of the struggle against the Chinese occupation at the most difficult and confused time of Tibetan history. The escape of His Holiness the Dalai Lama from Tibet in 1959 was also thanks to the wisdom and efforts of Kyabje Trijang Dorje Chang.

Most reports suggest that after the exodus from Tibet in 1959, the main concern was to acculturate into Indian society and yet maintain core Tibetan values and identity. The Dalai Lama's two tutors, Khyabje Ling Rinpoche and Khyabje Trijang Dorjechang played vital roles in outlining the basic structure of the Tibetan Government in Exile (TGIE), advising the Dalai Lama, and laying down the foundations of the three great monasteries in South India, the Tantric colleges and various smaller monasteries. Heads of other sects provided their leadership to their respective orders.

=== Tibetan national anthem ===
Kyabje Trijang Rinpoche wrote Gyallu, the Tibetan National Anthem, which was adopted by the community-in-exile around 1950 and is still used to this day. The anthem focuses on the radiance of Buddha Shakyamuni:

By the spread of Buddha's teachings in the ten directions, may everyone throughout the world enjoy the glories of happiness and peace.
In the battle against dark negative forces, may the auspicious sunshine of the teachings and beings of Tibet and the brilliance of a myriad radiant prosperities be ever triumphant.

== Views on Dorje Shugden ==
Trijang Rinpoche viewed Dorje Shugden as an enlightened being, who exhibits a worldly (unenlightened) aspect but is in fact no other than the Buddha Manjushri. Trijang Rinpoche states:

Accordingly, although he is, in definitive terms Venerable Manjusri, himself, one who is a Buddha, for sentient beings for whom a pacifying form accords with their fortune and aspiration, he appears to trainees in a beautiful divine form that is pleasant to see such as the emanation as the youthful divine child, Lodro Rinchen. For some who are qualified vessels yet lack the fortune to be able to see him in that form, he emanates in human forms such as Sakya Pandita. Then again, in order to subdue vicious beings who cannot be subdued through peaceful means, he appears in ugly forms such as that of yakshas and rakshas, brandishing terrifying weapons and voraciously devouring the three realms in an instant, that control and subdue all of the proudest fierce worldly deities. Of these wrathful types, there are both Yidams and Protectors, and the Protectors are of both mundane and supra‐mundane aspects. Yidams are those such as the three: Dra Nag Yamantaka, Dong Yamanataka, and Vajra Bhairava Yamantaka. In the aspect of a supra‐mundane Protector, he is Dharmaraja Kalarupa and, in the aspect of a mundane protector, he is the great Dharmapala Mighty Dorje Shugden.

Quoting what he heard from Pabongka during a ceremony, Trijang Rinpoche states that Shugden will harm and kill those who mix Tsongkhapa's tradition with other schools:

[This protector of the doctrine] is extremely important for holding Dzong-ka-ba's tradition without mixing and corrupting [it] with confusions due to the great violence and the speed of the force of his actions, which fall like lightning to punish violently all those beings who have wronged the Yellow Hat Tradition, whether they are high or low.[This protector is also particularly significant with respect to the fact that] many from our own side, monks or lay people, high or low, are not content with Dzong-ka-ba's tradition, which is like pure gold, [and] have mixed and corrupted [this tradition with ] the mistaken views and practices from other schools, which are tenet systems that are reputed to be incredibly profound and amazingly fast but are [in reality] mistakes among mistakes, faulty, dangerous and misleading paths. In regard to this situation, this protector of the doctrine, this witness, manifests his own form or a variety of unbearable manifestations of terrifying and frightening wrathful and fierce appearances. Due to that, a variety of events, some of them having happened or happening, some of which have been heard or seen, seem to have taken place: some people become unhinged and mad, some have a heart attack and suddenly die, some [see] through a variety of inauspicious signs [their] wealth, accumulated possessions and descendants disappear without leaving any trace, like a pond whose feeding river has ceased, whereas some [find it] difficult to achieve anything in successive lifetimes.

== Trijang Chocktrul Rinpoche ==
Trijang Rinpoche's tulku, Trijang Chocktrul Rinpoche, lives in the United States as a private citizen.
