= Ling Rinpoche =

Tibetan tulku

The 6th Kyabje Ling Rinpoche

Kyabje Yongzin Ling Rinpoche is a Tibetan tulku. The best-known incarnation is the sixth incarnation, Thupten Lungtok Namgyal Thinley (1903 - 1983), a Tibetan buddhist scholar and teacher.

Thupten Lungtok Namgyal Thinley, the 6th Yongzin Ling Rinpoche, was one of the most renowned, excellent and qualified masters of the 20th century. His students included masters from all four Tibetan Buddhist schools. He was very learned and an accomplished writer, poet and expert on grammar. In 1965 Ling Rinpoche was appointed the 97th Ganden Tripa and held the position as the head of the Gelug school for 19 years, longer than any other occupant of this throne.

Kyabje Yongzin Ling Rinpoche was born in Tibet in 1903, not far from Lhasa in Kyisho, a place known as an abode of Cakrasamvara and his consort. After only 12 years of study at Drepung Loseling Monastic University, he received a Geshe Lharampa degree at 21 years old. Rinpoche served as Disciplinarian and Abbot of Gyuto Tantric Monastery, before serving as the 14th Dalai Lama's Principal Tutor. He fled with the Dalai Lama from Tibet in 1959 and lived in India for the remainder of his life.

Kyabje Yongzin Ling Rinpoche gave many public and private teachings and initiations throughout his life in Tibet, India, Europe and North America. He died in Dharamshala, India at the age of 81. Rinpoche's consciousness reportedly remained in his body after he died, in the clear light meditation on the mind of death ('Tukdam'), for thirteen days.

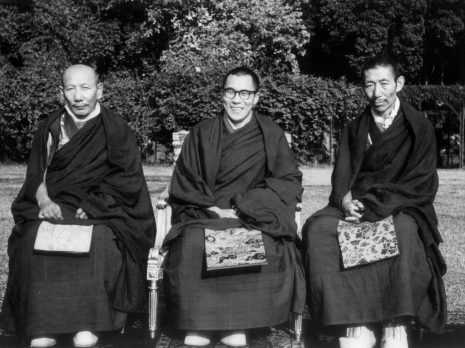
The 6th Ling Rinpoche, the 14th Dalai Lama and the 3rd Trijang Rinpoche at Hyderabad House, New Delhi, 1956

Prior to Kyabje Ling Rinpoche, three earlier incarnations of Ling Rinpoche were tutors for previous Dalai Lamas, including the 13th, the 12th and the 6th Dalai Lamas. Three incarnations of Ling Rinpoche were also Ganden Tripas. Over many years, the Ling Rinpoche incarnations founded many monasteries in Tibet and taught students in every sect of Tibetan Buddhism. Many of the monks in Ling Khangtsen come from these monasteries.

The current incarnation of Ling Rinpoche, the 7th Kyabje Yongzin Ling Choktrul Rinpoche, was born in India on November 18, 1985. He was taken to the Tibetan Children's Village in Dharamsala after his mother died, and stayed there until the Dalai Lama recognized him as the reincarnation of his Principal Tutor, the 6th Kyabje Yongzin Ling Rinpoche, who died on December 25, 1983.

The 7th Kyabje Yongzin Ling Rinpoche joined Drepung Monastic University's Loseling College in 1990, which was re-established in the Mundgod Tibetan settlement in South India. His enrollment and return to the monastery of his predecessors was celebrated with large, traditional religious ceremonies for auspiciousness. The 3rd, 4th, 5th and 6th Yongzin Ling Rinpoches had studied there as members of Drepung Loseling Monastery.

The Dalai Lama gave the young Ling Rinpoche novice monk vows in 1993 to continue a monastic lineage. He also received full monastic (‘Bikshu’) vows from Dalai Lama exactly 50 years after the Dalai Lama had received them from his Principal Tutor. Monks usually receive Bikshu vows when they are 20 years old. Kyabje Yongzin Ling Rinpoche was asked to lead a Long Life Puja on March 5, 2004, which was organized by the Tibetan Government to commemorate the 50th anniversary of the Dalai Lama taking the Bikshu vows. The 6th Kyabje Yongzin Ling Rinpoche had given them to him in 1954 in front of the Jho statue in Lhasa's Jokhang temple. Since Ling Rinpoche was 20 years old at the time, the Dalai Lama gave him the Bikshu vows on March 3, 2004, at the 14th Dalai Lama's palace in Dharamshala India. The 6th Kyabje Yongzin Ling Rinpoche had received all his monastic vows from the 13th Dalai Lama in the Potala Palace.

The Gelug tradition emphasizes a deep and intensive study of Buddhist scriptures. The 7th Kyabje Ling Rinpoche's monastic studies began when he was ten years old under the guidance of Dalai Lama. Geshe Namgyal Wangchen and Geshe Thubten Rapgay served as his two main tutors. During breaks from studying, he has completed private retreats. The 7th Yongzin Ling Rinpoche received his Geshe degree Drepung Monastic University in November 2016 and enrolled at Gyuto Tantric College in Dharamsala, India in April 2017 for a year of tantric studies that traditionally follows the completion of a Geshe degree.

In 1991 Ling Rinpoche gave his first teaching in South Korea. Since then he has given teachings and tantric initiations in many countries in Asia and Europe, Canada, Australia, the United States, Mexico and Israel, as well as Tibetan settlements throughout India and Nepal. Rinpoche has also organized and attended many important Buddhist events.

Ling Rinpoche organized the Dalai Lama's historic series of Jangchup Lamrim Teachings on the 18 classic Stages of the Path to Enlightenment treatises. They were held at Sera, Drepung, Ganden and Tashi Lhunpo monasteries between 2012 and 2015, with approximately 40,000 people from all over the world attending each year. In November 2012, while driving to Goa Airport to greet Dalai Lama who had arrived to give the Jangchup Lamrim teachings, Ling Rinpoche was in a car accident which was fatal for the driver. Kyabje Ling Rinpoche sustained serious injuries requiring lengthy surgeries. His complete recovery took several years.

Ling Rinpoche attends international events dedicated to preserving Buddhist traditions, including the International Conference on Vinaya and World Peace Puja in Bodhgaya, India and the conference on the relevance of Buddhism in the 21st Century in Rajgir, India that was organized by the Indian Government Ministry of Culture and the Nava Nalanda Mahavihara. Starting in 2004 he has also participated in the Mind and Life Institute dialogues held in India between the Dalai Lama and scientists on a variety of topics, such physics, neuroplasticity and destructive emotions.

== List of Ling Rinpoches ==
S.No	Name	Life Span	Gaden Tripa and tutor to the Dalai Lama
1	Trichen Dhondup Gyatso, the 1st Kyabje Yongzin Ling Rinpoche Tehor Nagtsangpa	1655–1727	The 48th Gaden Tripa and tutor to the 6th Dalai Lama
2	Gedun Tenpai Gyaltsen, the 2nd Kyabje Yongzin Ling Rinpoche	1728–1790	Conferred the famed title of ‘Ertini Dalai Hothothu’ for his illuminating exemplary service to Dharma
3	Lobsang Tenpai Gyaltsen, the 3rd Kyabje Yongzin Ling Rinpoche	1791–1810	
4	Ngawang Lungtok Yonten Gyatso, the 4th Yongzin Ling Rinpoche	1811–1853	the 75th Gaden Tripa and Tutor to the 11th Dalai Lama
5	Lobsang Lungtok Tenzin Thinley, the 5th Kyabje Yongzin Ling Rinpoche	1856–1902	Sharpa Choeje and tutor to the 13th Dalai Lama
6	Thupten Lungtok Namgyal Thinley, the 6th Kyabje Yongzin Ling Rinpoche	1903—1983	the 97th Gaden Tripa and tutor to the 14th Dalai Lama
7	Tenzin Lungtok Thinley Choephak, the 7th Kyabje Yongzin Ling Rinpoche	Current incarnation born 1985	
