= Heruka =

Beings in Vajrayana Buddhism

Heruka (Sanskrit: हेरुक, Standard Tibetan: ཁྲག་འཐུང, Wylie: khrag 'thung) is the name of a category of wrathful deities, enlightened beings in Vajrayana Buddhism that adopt a fierce countenance to benefit sentient beings. In East Asia, these are called Wisdom Kings.

Herukas represent the embodiment of indivisible bliss and emptiness. They appear as iṣṭa-devatā (Tibetan: ཡི་དམ་, Wylie: yi dam) or meditational deities for tantric sādhanā, usually placed in a mandala and often appearing in Yab-Yum.

== Derivation and meaning of the term ==
Heruka represents wrathful imagery with indivisible emptiness (śūnyatā), bliss, peace, wisdom, compassion (bodhicitta), and love. Herukas represent unified consciousness, with emptiness being a reflection of "non-phenomena" or emptiness which is "all love," or removal of imagery to reach universal love, mercy, and compassion-mind.

Heruka is revered as an fully enlightened Buddha who manifests in a wrathful form to guide seekers towards liberation. Interpretation of Heruka is similar to the female ḍākiṇī or buddha Vajrayogini.

The Sanskrit term Heruka was translated into both Chinese and Tibetan as "blood drinker," which scholar Ronald Davidson calls "curious," speculating that the nonliteral translation is derived from an association the term has with cremation grounds and 'charnel grounds' (Sanskrit: śmaśāna) (which absorb the blood of the dead). Sanskrit terms for blood drinker include asrikpa, reflecting a Sanskrit word for blood (asrik), and raktapa, raktapayin, or rakshasa, derived from an alternate root term for blood (rakta). Unlike the Chinese and Tibetan (Tratung, wylie: khrag 'thung) terms used to translate it, the Sanskrit term heruka does not literally mean blood drinker, although the fact that it was rendered as such into two other languages strongly suggests an according Indian interpretive etymology.

== Eight Herukas of the Nyingma Mahayoga ==
The eight Herukas (Wylie: sgrub pa bka’ brgyad) of the Nyingma mahayoga tradition (and their corresponding sadhanas) are said to have been received by Padmakara from the Eight Vidyadharas (Tib. Rigdzin), or Eight Great Acharyas: Manjushrimitra, Nagarjuna, Vajrahumkara, Vimalamitra, Prabhahasti, Dhanasamskrita, Shantigarbha and Guhyachandra. They were proficient in the practices of, respectively:

1) Yamantaka (Tib. Jampal Shinje, ’jam dpal sku) the wrathful Manjushri, the deity of body;
2) Hayagriva (Tib. Pema Sung, padma gsung) the wrathful Avalokiteśvara, the deity of speech;
3) Vishuddha/Sri Samyak (Tib. Yangdak Thuk, Wylie: yang dag thugs) the wrathful Vajrapani deity of mind;
4) Mahottara (Tib. Chem Chok, Wylie: che mchog) the wrathful Samantabhadra, the deity of enlightened qualities;
5) Vajrakilaya/Vajrakumara (Tib. Dorje Phurba, phur ba ‘phrin las), the wrathful Vajrasattva, the deity of purification;
6) Matarah (Tib. Mamo Botong, mo rbod gtong) the wrathful Akasagarbha, the deity of calling and dispatching;
7) Lokastotrapuja-natha (Tib. Jigten Chotod, ’jig rten mchod bstod) the wrathful Ksitigarbha, the deity of worldly offering and praise;
8) Vajramantrabhiru (Tib. Mopa Dragnak, mod pa drag sngags) the wrathful Maitreya, the deity of wrathful mantras.

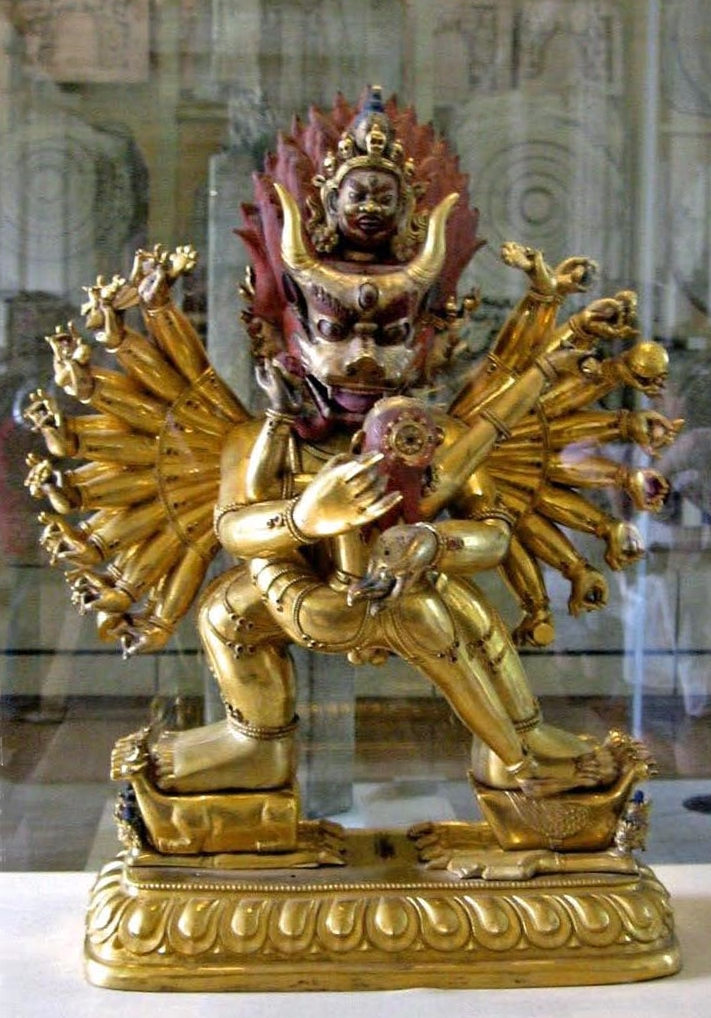
Yamantaka Vajrabhairav, British Museum

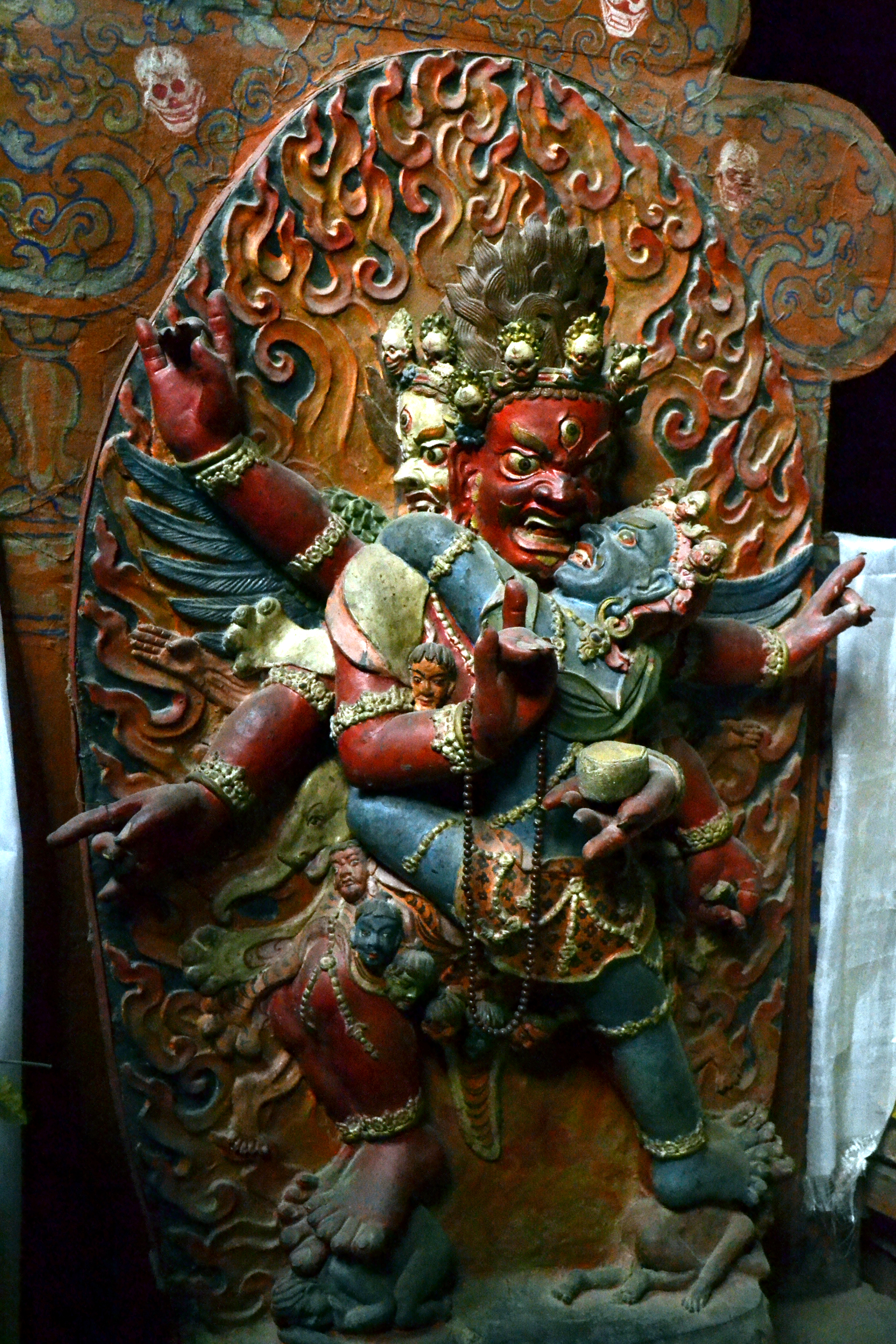
Hayagriva

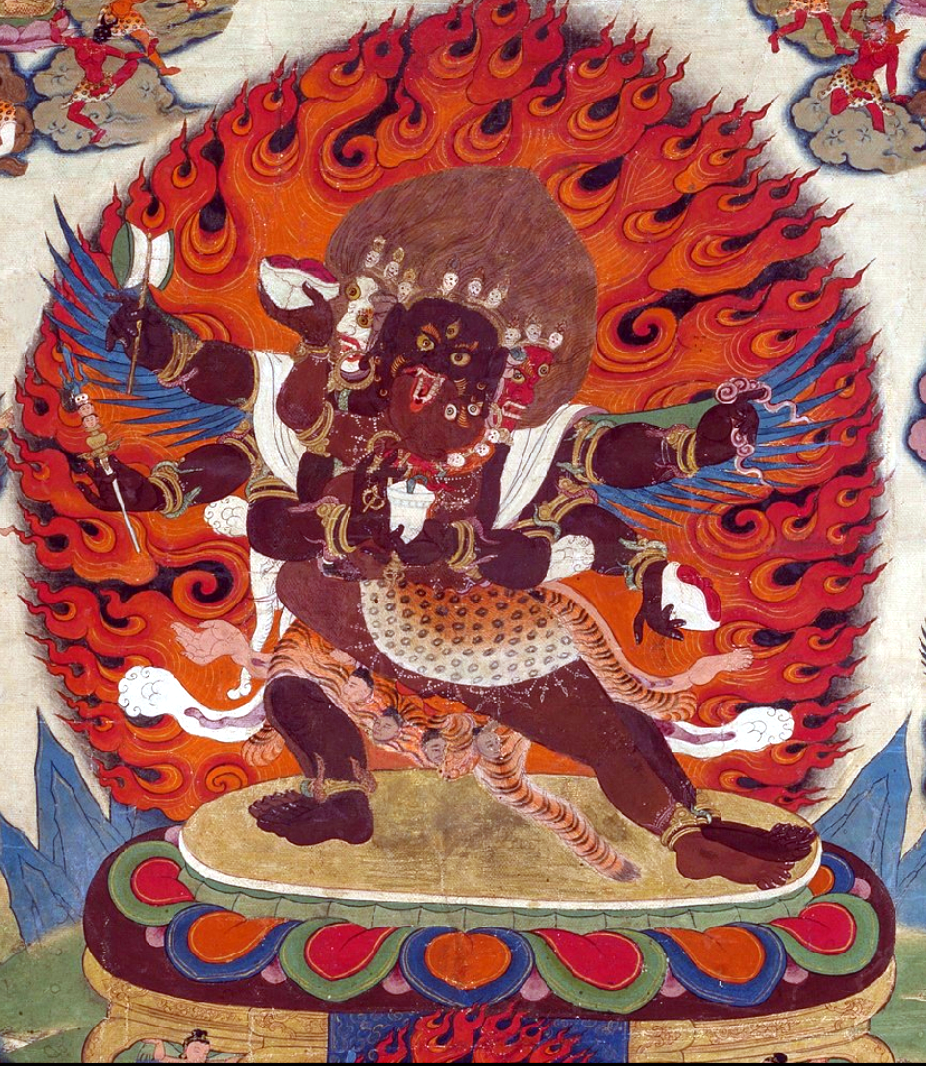
Mahottara Heruka with 3 faces and 6 arms

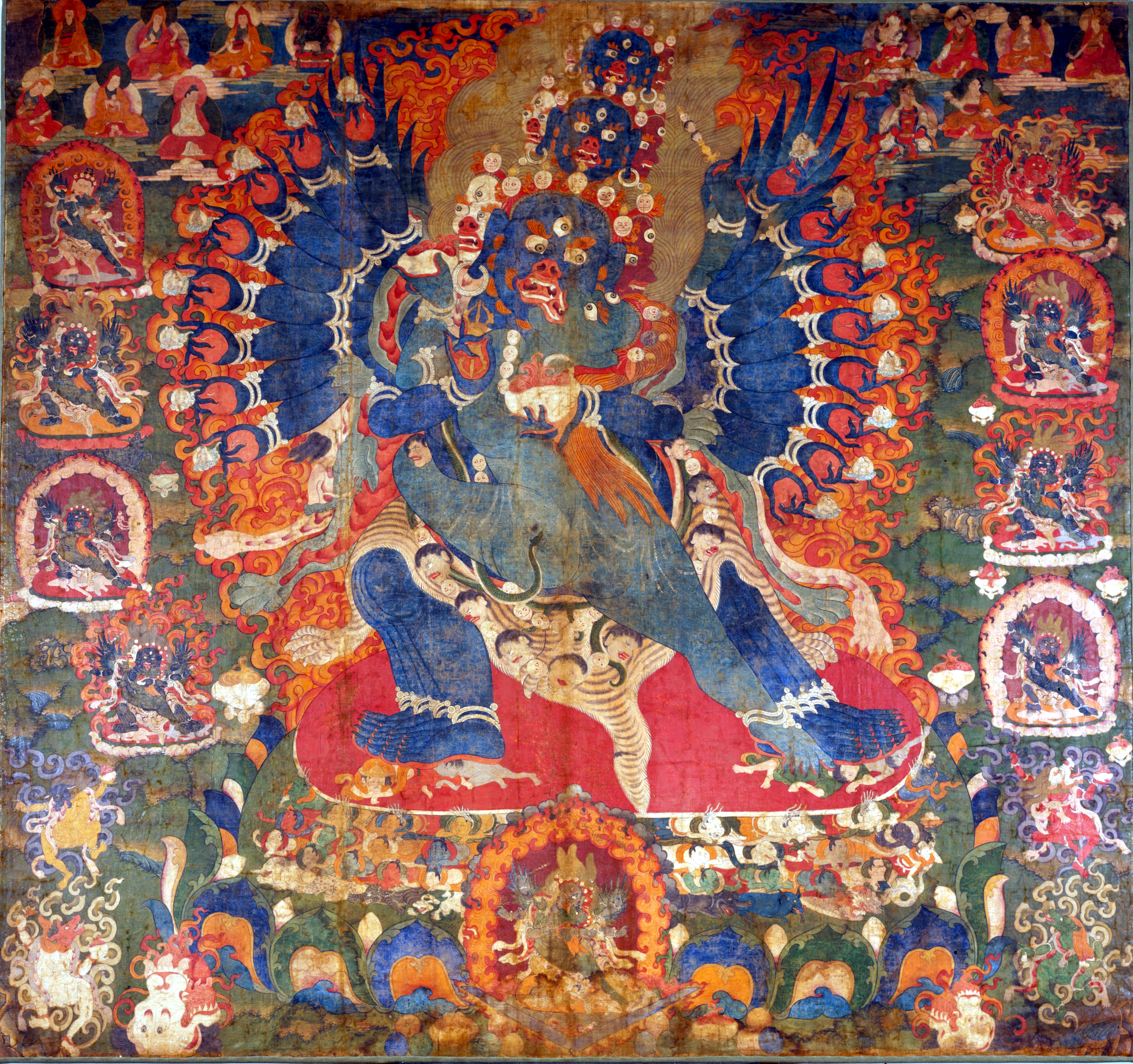
Mahottara Heruka with 9 stacked faces and 18 arms

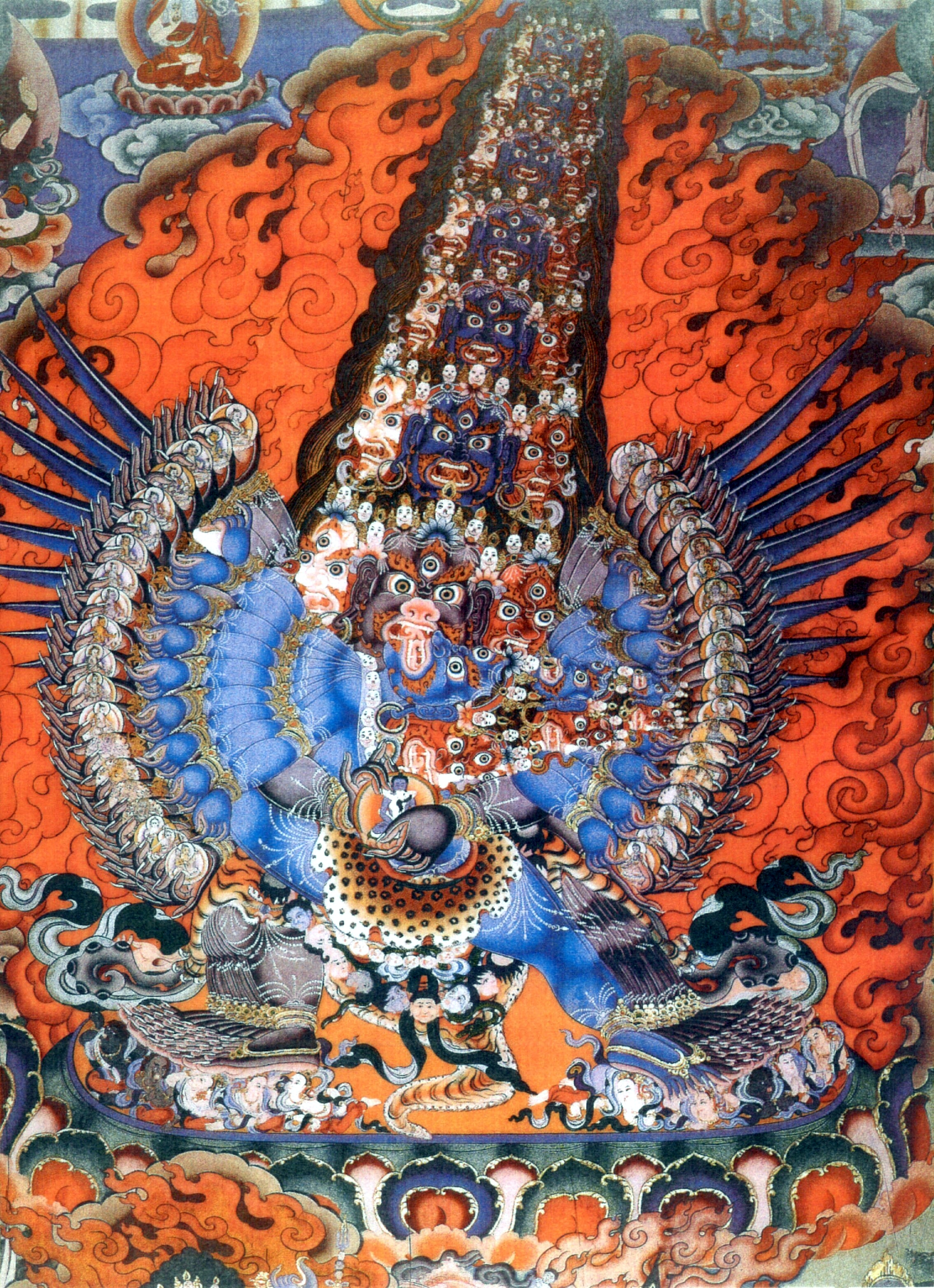
Mahottara Heruka with 21 faces and 42 arms

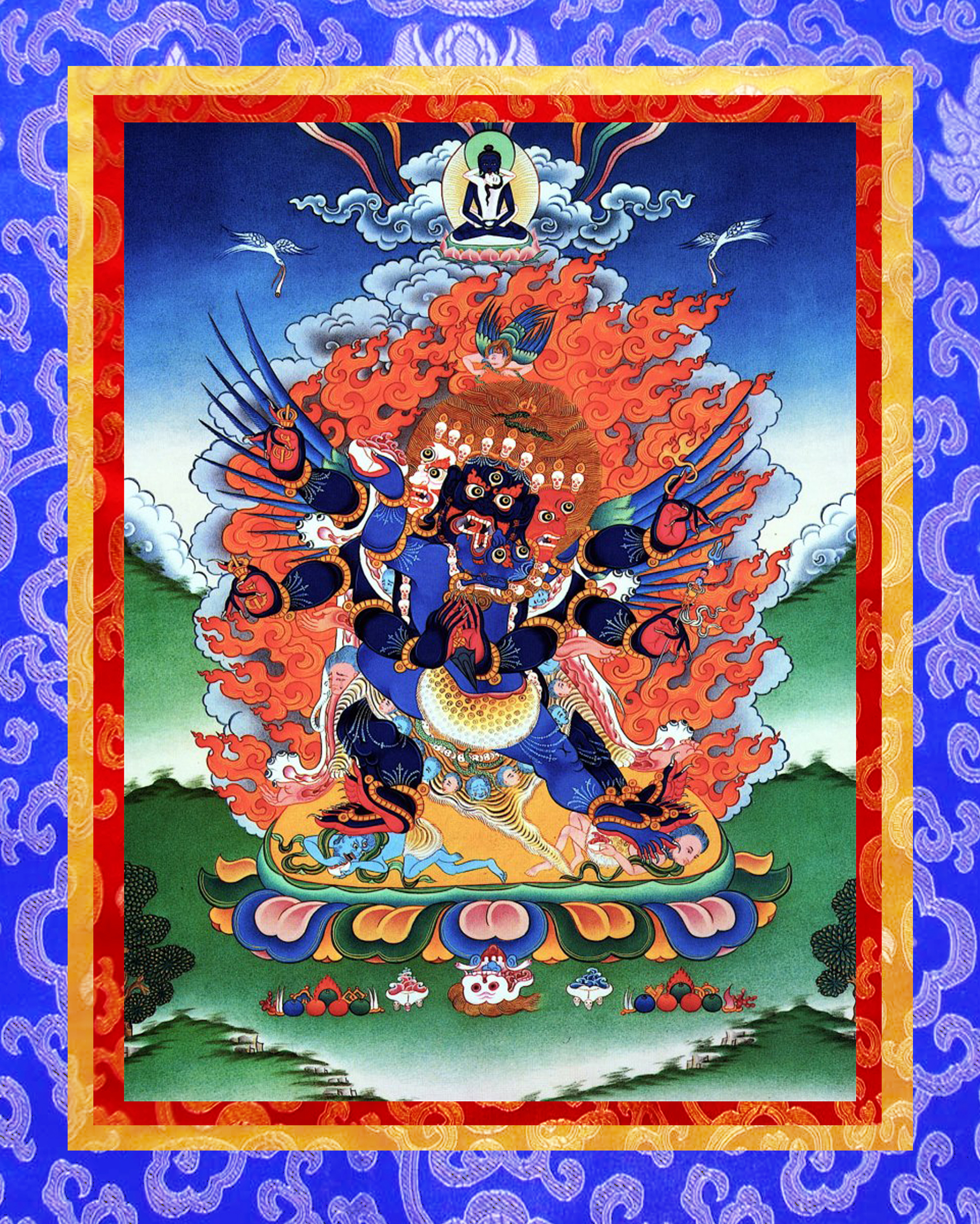
Vajrakilaya

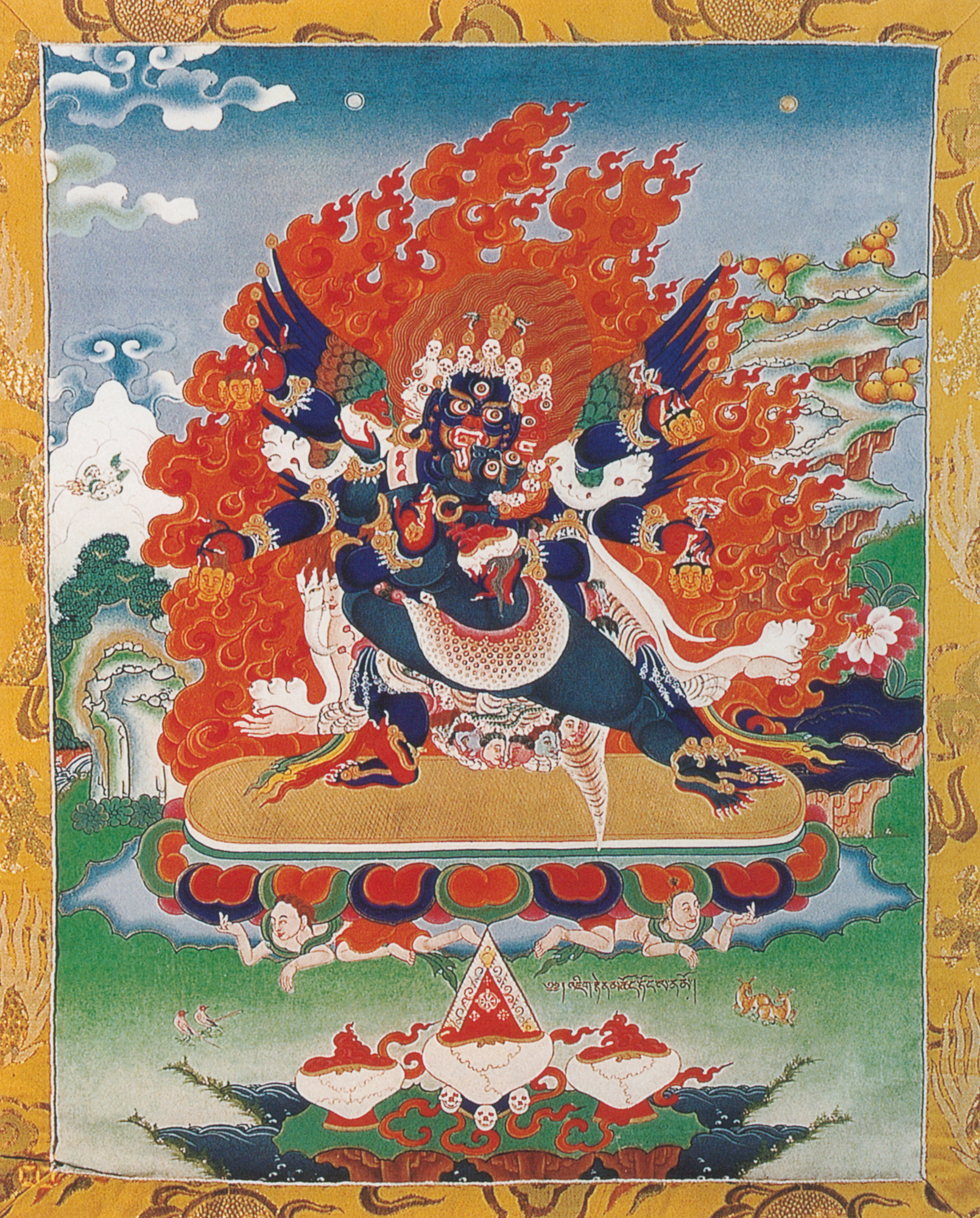
Lokastotrapuja-natha

Padmasambhava is quoted in the Tibetan Book of the Dead: "The crucial point is indeed that those who have meditated on the formal description of these Herukakaya ('bodies of Heruka'), and also made offerings and praise to them, or, at the very least, have simply seen their painted and sculpted images, may recognise the forms that arise here and attain liberation."

== See also ==
- Wrathful deities
