= Dragpa Gyaltsen =

Dragpa Gyaltsen may refer to:

- Jetsun Dragpa Gyaltsen (1147–1216), third of the five Sakya Patriarchs
- Duldzin Dragpa Gyaltsen (1350–1413), one of the main disciples of Je Tsongkhapa
- Gongma Drakpa Gyaltsen (1374–1432), ruler of Tibet from 1385 to 1432
- Tulku Dragpa Gyaltsen (1619–1656), contemporary of the 5th Dalai Lama
