= Taktsé =

Taktsé (also written Tagtse, Dagzê, or Stag-rtse) can refer to:

- Taktsé Castle in central Tibet.
- Dagzê District in the Tibet Autonomous Region of China.
- Taktse International School in Sikkim, India.

== See also ==
- Tangtse village in Ladakh, India
