= 5th Dalai Lama =

Spiritual and political leader of Tibet from 1642 to 1682

5th Dalai Lama, Ngawang Lobsang
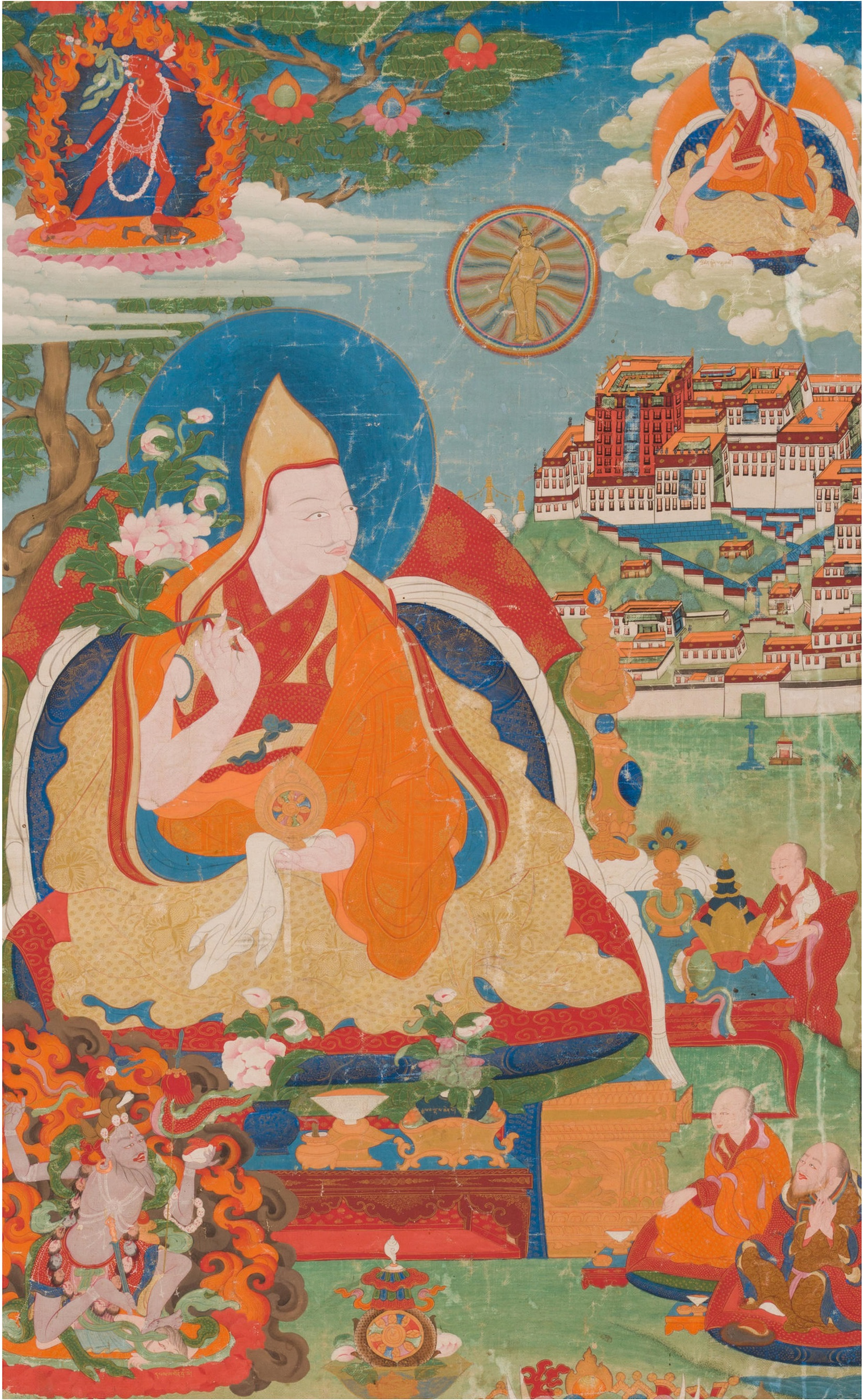
- Title: His Holiness the 5th Dalai Lama

Personal life
- Born: 1617 Lhoka Chingwar Taktse, Ü-Tsang, Tibet
- Died: 1682 (aged 64–65) Lhasa, Tibet
- Parents: Dudul Rabten (father); Kunga Lhanzi (mother)

Religious life
- Religion: Tibetan Buddhism

Senior posting
- Period in office: 1642–1682
- Predecessor: 4th Dalai Lama, Yonten Gyatso
- Successor: 6th Dalai Lama, Tsangyang Gyatso

Tibetan name
- Tibetan: ངག་དབང་བློ་བཟང་རྒྱ་མཚོ་
Transcriptions
- Wylie: Ngag-dbang blo-bzang rgya-mtsho

The 5th Dalai Lama, Ngawang Lobsang Gyatso (Tibetan: ངག་དབང་བློ་བཟང་རྒྱ་མཚོ་, Wylie: Ngag-dbang blo-bzang rgya-mtsho) (1617–1682) was recognized as the 5th Dalai Lama, and he became the first Dalai Lama to hold both Tibet's political and spiritual leadership roles.

He is often referred to simply as the Great Fifth, being the key religious and temporal leader of Tibetan Buddhism and Tibet. He is credited with unifying all of Tibet under the Ganden Phodrang, after Gushri Khan's successful military interventions.

As an independent head of state, he established priest and patron relations with both Mongolia and the Qing dynasty simultaneously, and had positive relations with other neighboring countries.

He began the custom of meeting early European explorers.

The 5th Dalai Lama built the Potala Palace, and also wrote 24 volumes' worth of scholarly and religious works on a wide range of subjects.

== Early life ==
To understand the context within which the Dalai Lama institution came to hold temporal power in Tibet during the lifetime of the 5th, it may be helpful to review not just the early life of Lobsang Gyatso but also the world into which he was born, as Künga Migyur.

=== Künga Migyur's family ===
The child who would become His Holiness the 5th Dalai Lama was born in the Chonggye Valley in Ü, south of the Yarlung Tsangpo River and about two days' journey south-east of Lhasa, to a prominent family of nobles with traditional ties to both Nyingma and Kagyu lineages.

The aristocratic Zahor family into which he was born had held their seat since the 14th century at Taktsé Castle, south of Lhasa – a legendary stronghold of Tibetan kings in the days of the early empire, before Songtsen Gampo (604–650 CE) had moved his capital from there to Lhasa.

=== Parents and naming ===
His Holiness the 5th Dalai Lama's father was called Dudul Rabten, the local ruler of the Chonggye valley, also known as Hor Dudül Dorjé. His mother was called Tricham, Kunga Lhadze or Kunga Lhanzi.

His father had friendly relations with the Drugpa Kagyu and his mother had connections with the Jonangpa Kagyu through her family at Nakartse Dzong.

Thus, after his birth on the 22nd day of the 9th month of the Fire-snake year (late 1617), Taranatha, the most remarkable scholar and exponent of the Jonang school (a.k.a. Tagten Tulku, a.k.a. Kunga Nyingpo), named the child "Künga Migyur Tobgyal Wanggi Gyalpo." His family called him "Künga Migyur."

=== Künga Migyur's childhood ===
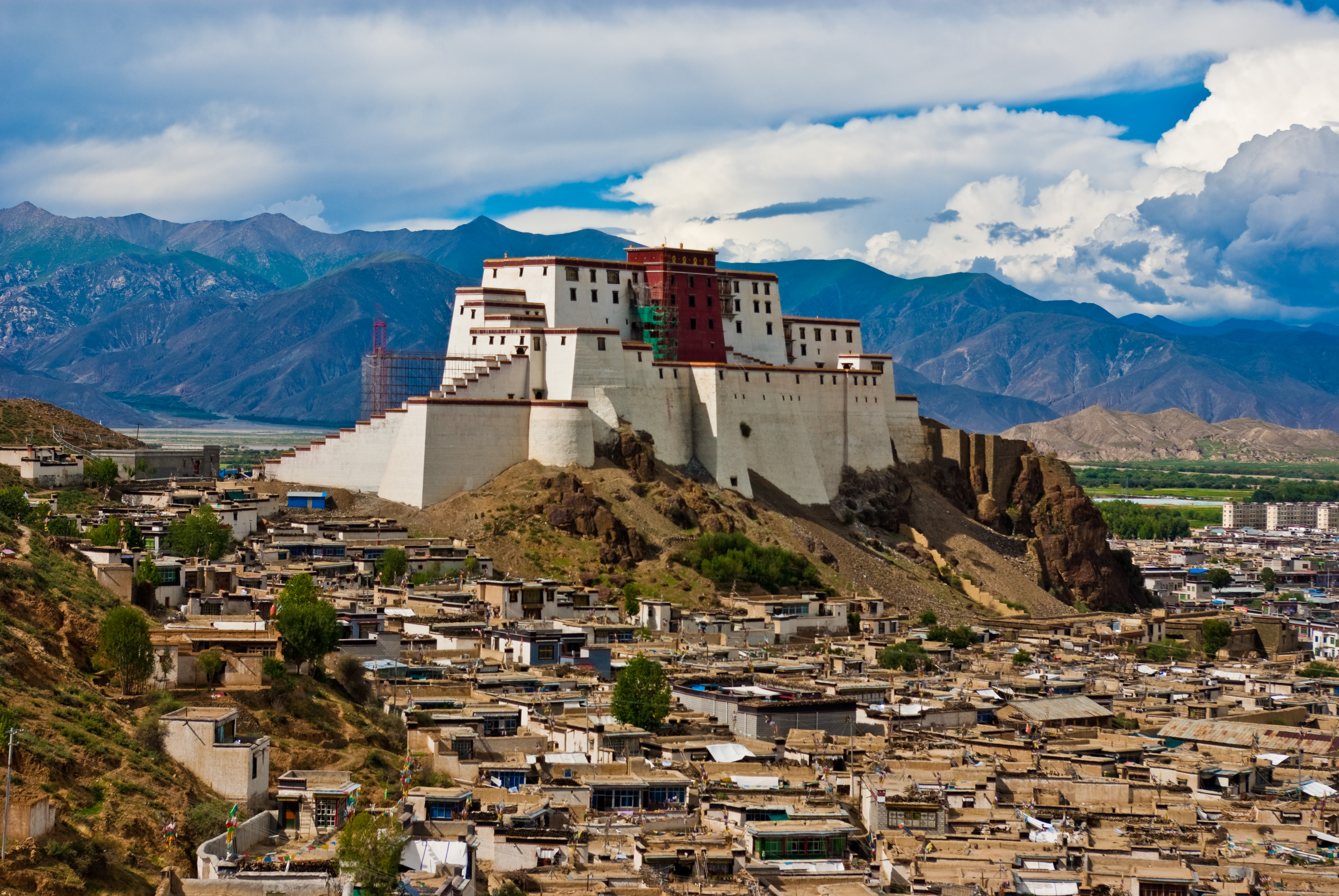
Shigatse, 2009.

The child's father, Dudul Rabten, was arrested in 1618 for his involvement in a plot to overthrow Karma Phuntsok Namgyal, leader of the Tsang hegemony. Karma Phuntsok's grandfather Zhingshak Tseten Dorje (also known as Karma Tseten) had originally been appointed Governor of Tsang by the Rinpung Prime Minister Ngawang Namgyel in 1548.

Tseten Dorje had rebelled against the heirs of Ngawang Namgyel starting in 1557, eventually overthrowing the Rinpung and establishing the Tsang hegemony in 1565 by declaring himself King of Tsang. Tseten Dorje established his residence at Samdruptse castle, also called Shigatse, near the Gelug monastery of Tashilhunpo, and together with his nine sons, eventually extended the reach of his power over both of Tibet's central provinces of Ü and Tsang.

The secular government of King Tseten Dorje and his descendants enjoyed general support from the Sakya, Jonang, and Kagyu schools, while maintaining somewhat tense but cordial relations with his Gelug neighbours at Tashilhunpo.

Then Altan Khan, King of the Tumed Mongols, invited Drepung Monastery's abbot Sonam Gyatso to Mongolia. In 1577–78 Sonam Gyatso accepted, went there and converted him and his subjects to Buddhism, receiving the Mongolian name "Dalai" in the process by which action his lineage became known as the "Dalai Lamas" and he became the 3rd Dalai Lama.

His two predecessors became known as the 1st and 2nd Dalai Lamas posthumously.

The Samdruptse government saw this development as a politico-religious alliance between the Gelugpa and a foreign power.

When Sonam Gyatso died, the Gelugpa recognised a Mongolian prince as his incarnation and so a Mongolian 4th Dalai Lama, Yonten Gyatso (1589–1617), was installed as the abbot of Drepung. This increased Mongolian involvement with the Gelugpa even further and enabled more Mongolian intervention in Tibetan affairs.

As a result, King Tseten Dorje's suspicions about Gelugpa ambitions rose and when in 1616 the 4th Dalai Lama died young, at the age of 28, in an attempt to defeat the identification process, the King prohibited the Gelugpa monks from searching for his incarnation.

Dudul Rabten's arrest occurred at roughly the same time that his infant son had been recognized, in secret, by lamas of the Gelug order as the reincarnation of the 4th Dalai Lama, while Tashilhunpo's abbot Lobsang Chökyi Gyaltsen used diplomacy to persuade King Karma Phuntsok Namgyal to lift the ban he'd put in place on seeking out the 5th Dalai Lama. Dudul Rabten escaped his captors and tried to reach eastern Tibet, but was rearrested. Dudul Rabten died in captivity in 1626 at Samdruptse – Karma Phuntsok Namgyal's castle also known as Shigatse – and thus, he never lived to see his son again.

The young 5th Dalai Lama's family were ordered by Karma Phuntsok Namgyal to live at court in Samdruptse, but his mother, Kunga Lhanzi, fearing retribution from the king, returned with her son to her family's home, Narkatse castle, in Yardrog.

=== Künga Migyur's recognition ===
The infant Künga Migyur's name had been drawn, by lot, from among the names of three children considered likely candidates in a series of divination rituals including a doughball divination which was held in secret (on account of king Karma Phuntsok Namgyal's prohibition against seeking the 4th Dalai Lama's reincarnation) at Radeng monastery. The former 4th Dalai Lama's chief attendant, Sonam Choephel (1595–1658), is credited with having discovered the incarnation.

While the Karma, Drugpa and Jonangpa Kagyu orders, (beside the Gelug group from Drepung monastery) had all independently sought to claim Künga Migyur as a reincarnation of one or another of their own lamas who'd also died in 1616, young Künga Migyur's parents reportedly resisted their demands.

== Monastic life ==
=== Ordination ===
Lobsang Gyatso was the name which Künga Migyur received from Lobsang Chökyi Gyaltsen upon taking novice monastic ordination from him at Drepung.

In 1638, when he took full ordination at the Jokhang Temple in Lhasa, Ngawang was added to his name, Ngawang Lobsang Gyatso. At this time, his interest in the Nyingmapa teachings began to deepen and his devotion to the Nyingma master Zur Choying Rangdrol became somewhat conspicuous.

=== Relations with the Panchen Lama ===
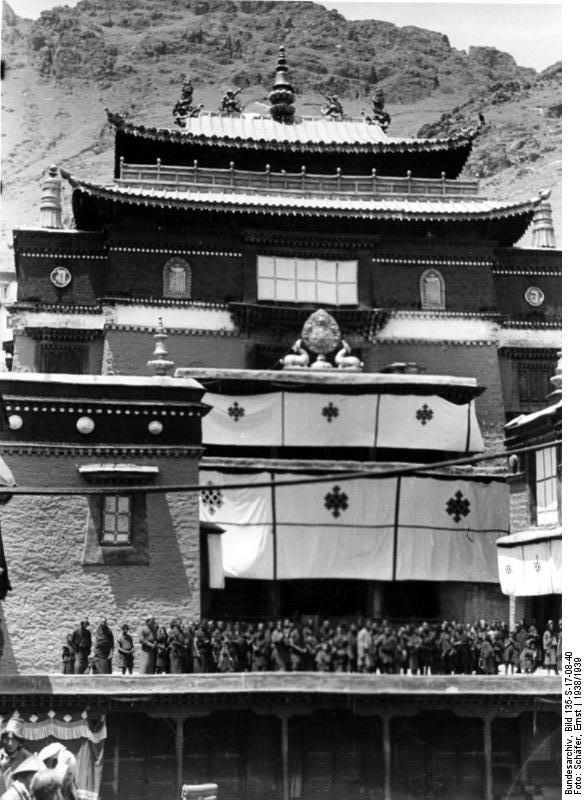
Tashilhunpo Monastery, 1938 Tibet expedition photograph by Ernst Schäfer in German Federal Archives.

Lobsang Chökyi Gyaltsen (1570–1662), the Panchen Lama and the first to be accorded this title during his lifetime, was the tutor and a close ally of the 5th Dalai Lama, who, according to Thubten Jigme Norbu and Hugh E. Richardson, declared or pronounced the Panchen to be 'an incarnation of Dhayani Buddha Amitābha' – although other sources all appear to indicate that he was considered as such from the start.

After the 5th Dalai Lama returned from China, on a teaching tour of Tsang, he visited his senior tutor and close friend the elderly Panchen Lama at Tashilhunpo to receive lineage transmissions which he still lacked and at this point, he requested the Panchen to accept Tashilhunpo Monastery, built by the 1st Dalai Lama, as his multi-lifetime seat for future incarnations. Since then, every incarnation of the Panchen Lama has been the master of Tashilhunpo Monastery and it is there that they have all received their education and their mummified bodies were enshrined.

When Panchen Gyaltsen died in 1662 at 93, the 5th Dalai Lama immediately commenced the tradition of searching for his next incarnation. He composed a special prayer asking his master "to return" and directed the monks of Tibet's great monasteries to recite it. He also reserved the traditional title of Panchen (short for Pandita chen po "Great Scholar") – which had previously been a courtesy title for all exceptionally learned lamas – exclusively for the Panchen Lama and his successors (and, for those who consider him the 4th Panchen, for his three predecessors, as well). He had also predicted that Gyaltsen would continue to be reincarnated in the future as the "Panchen Lama."

The two had a teacher/disciple relationship going back to the 1st Dalai Lama Gendun Drup and his teacher Khedrup Je, considered by some in retrospect as the 1st Panchen Lama. From the time of His Holiness the 5th Dalai Lama, the two offices were known as Yab Sey Gonpo or "Father/Son Protectors" characterising their spiritual provenance as emanations of Amitābha and Avalokitesvara, as well as their interchangeable guru/disciple relationship. This continued, lifetime after lifetime well into the 20th century with whichever was elder becoming the teacher of the younger, giving both monastic ordination and passing on tantric lineage transmissions.

=== Education and practice ===
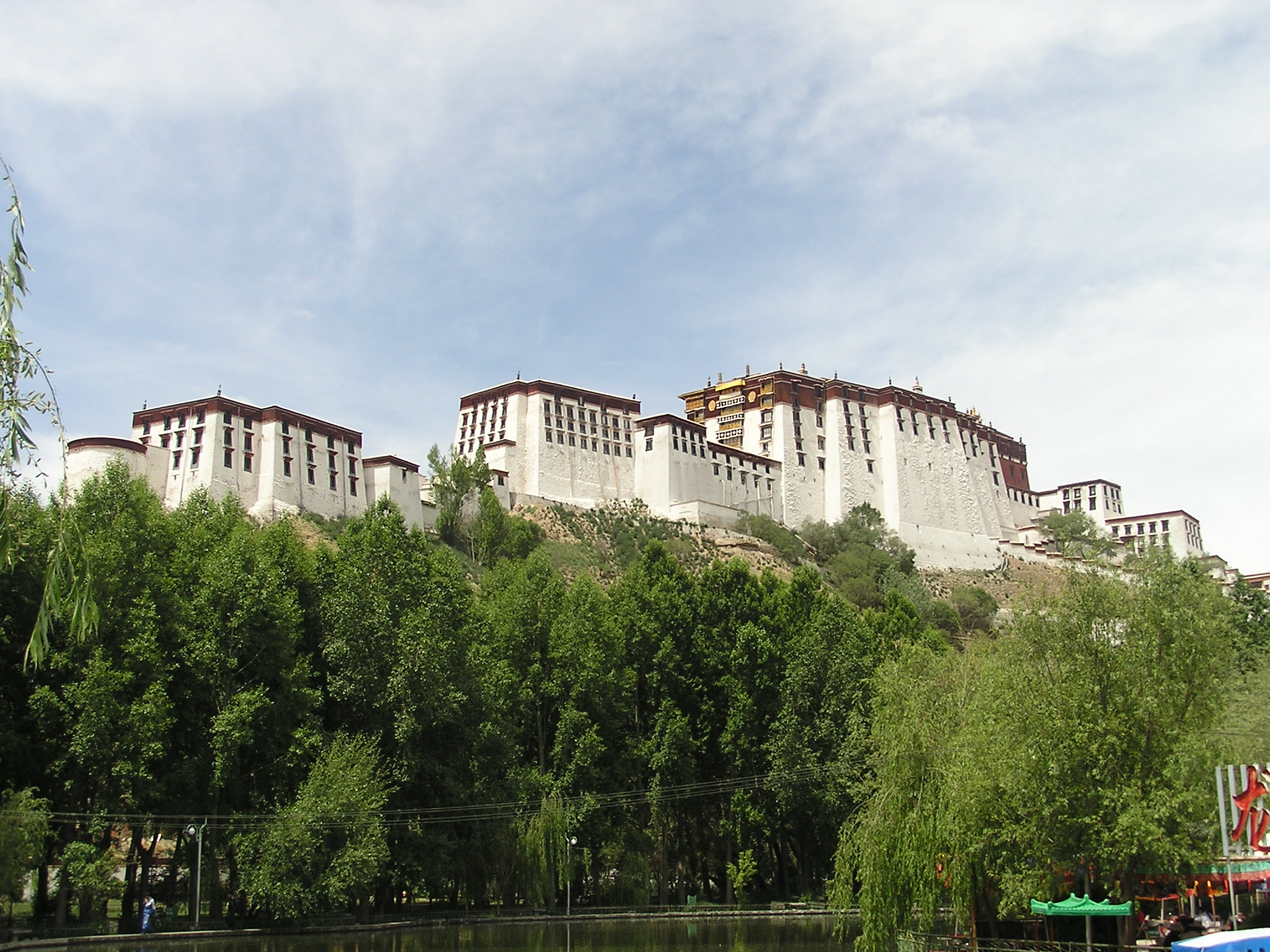
View of Potala from 5th Dalai Lama's private Lukhang temple, December, 2008.

Although the 5th Dalai Lama, Lobsang Gyatso, completed all his formal monastic training as a Gelugpa, proving to be an exceptional scholar, he also studied Nyingmapa doctrines, and took Nyingma tantric empowerments. The great Gelug scholar Sumpa Khenpo acknowledged that Lobsang Gyatso took a special interest in Nyingma tantric doctrines.

In fact, His Holiness the Fifth Dalai Lama stated in his autobiography that rather than the Panchen Lama or any other Gelug masters, the great Nyingma lama Zur Choying Rangdrol ‘the omniscient’ (kun mkhyen zur chos dbyings rang grol, 1604–1657) was his 'root guru', 'spiritual master' and his 'root master'.

== Ruler of Tibet ==
His Holiness the Fifth Dalai Lama Ngawang Lobsang Gyatso's rule over central Tibet may be characterized, in very broad terms:

- politically –
  - by the Mongol military intervention which ended decades of clan-wars in Dbus and Gtsang provinces, c.q. the Tibetan civil war of 1639–1642, whereafter he was invested with temporal power over Tibet;
- domestically –
  - Reestablishing Lhasa as capital;
  - Establishing Nechung as state oracle, and disposing of "perfidious spirit" Dolgyal, which later came to be identified with Dorje Shugden;
  - Resolving sectarian divides;
  - Establishing a pluralist theocracy.
- In terms of foreign policy –
  - by the formal establishment of friendly diplomatic relations with China's imperial court during the formative years of the Qing dynasty, and
  - by his meeting with European missionaries, early European explorers of Tibet, and
  - his military expeditions against Bhutan and the war against Ladakh. The Moghuls withdrew after being paid off by the 5th Dalai Lama.

=== Rise to power ===
==== Dzungar military intervention ====
Although the Fifth Dalai Lama would ultimately come to be known for unifying Tibet, it was his first regent Sonam Choephel (1595-1657 CE, also known as Sonam Rabten, treasurer of Ganden) who was, in fact, "the prime architect of the Gelug's rise to power". The 5th Dalai Lama would eventually assume complete power – including that of appointing his regents.

Sonam Choephel, the regent during the 5th Dalai Lama Lobsang Gyatso's youth, requested the aid of Güshi Khan, a powerful Dzungar military leader in carrying out a military strategy in the Dalai Lama's name, though apparently with neither Lobsang Gyatso's prior knowledge nor consent.

Güshi Khan (who was head of the Khoshut tribe) conquered Kham in 1640 bringing the Sakyas and the lords of Kham and Amdo under their control. His victory over Karma Tenkyong, the prince of Tsang in Shigatse, in 1642, completed the military conquest of the country and the establishment of the Khoshut Khanate. By this feat the Phagmodrupa dynasty, which was associated with a variant of the Kagyu school, was technically replaced; in fact it had been powerless for many years. By subsequently formally recognizing the Fifth Dalai Lama's authority in 1642, Güshi Khan effectively made Gyatso the temporal ruler of all Tibet.

Güshi Khan maintained friendly and respectful relations with Lobsang Gyatso, but died in 1655, leaving ten sons. Eight of them (along with their tribes) settled in the strategically important Koko Nur region of Amdo, where they frequently fought over territory. The 5th Dalai Lama sent several governors to the region between 1656 and 1659 to restore order. Although Güshi Khan's descendants (who would come to be known as the Upper Mongols) showed little interest in the administration of Tibet, they did appoint a regent for a while to act on their behalf in Lhasa, and gradually assimilated certain aspects of Tibetan culture into their own. They would also come to play a crucial rôle in extending the influence of the Gelug school within Amdo.

==== Dzungar conquest of Altishahr ====
The 5th Dalai Lama tutored Galdan Boshugtu Khan who later became leader of the Dzungar Khanate and granted him the titles of Hongtaiji and Boshoghtu (or Boshughtu) Khan. The Dalai Lama also sanctioned Galdan Boshugtu Khan's invasion of the last remaining remnants of the Chagatai Khanate in the Dzungar conquest of Altishahr after Afaq Khoja requested help from the Dalai Lama over the power struggle between the Afaqi and Ishaqi Khojas.

=== Tibet–Ladakh–Mughal War ===
In 1679, the 5th Dalai Lama overruled the advice of his Prime Minister and launched an expedition resulting in the Tibet–Ladakh–Mughal War that did not conclude until two years after his death with the 1684 Treaty of Tingmosgang.

=== Domestic activities ===
==== Reestablishing Lhasa as capital ====
In a move distinctly evocative of Songtsen Gampo, Lobsang Gyatso once again proclaimed Lhasa to be the capital of Tibet. Assembling his government there, he "appointed governors to the districts, chose ministers for his government, and promulgated a set of laws". The young Dalai Lama also transformed his regent into a prime minister – or, as the Tibetans call him, the Desi. Administrative authority was vested in the person of the Desi, while military power remained the special domain of Güshi Khan, whom the 5th Dalai Lama acknowledged as king of the Dzungar Upper Mongols in Kokonor.

===== Building the Potala =====
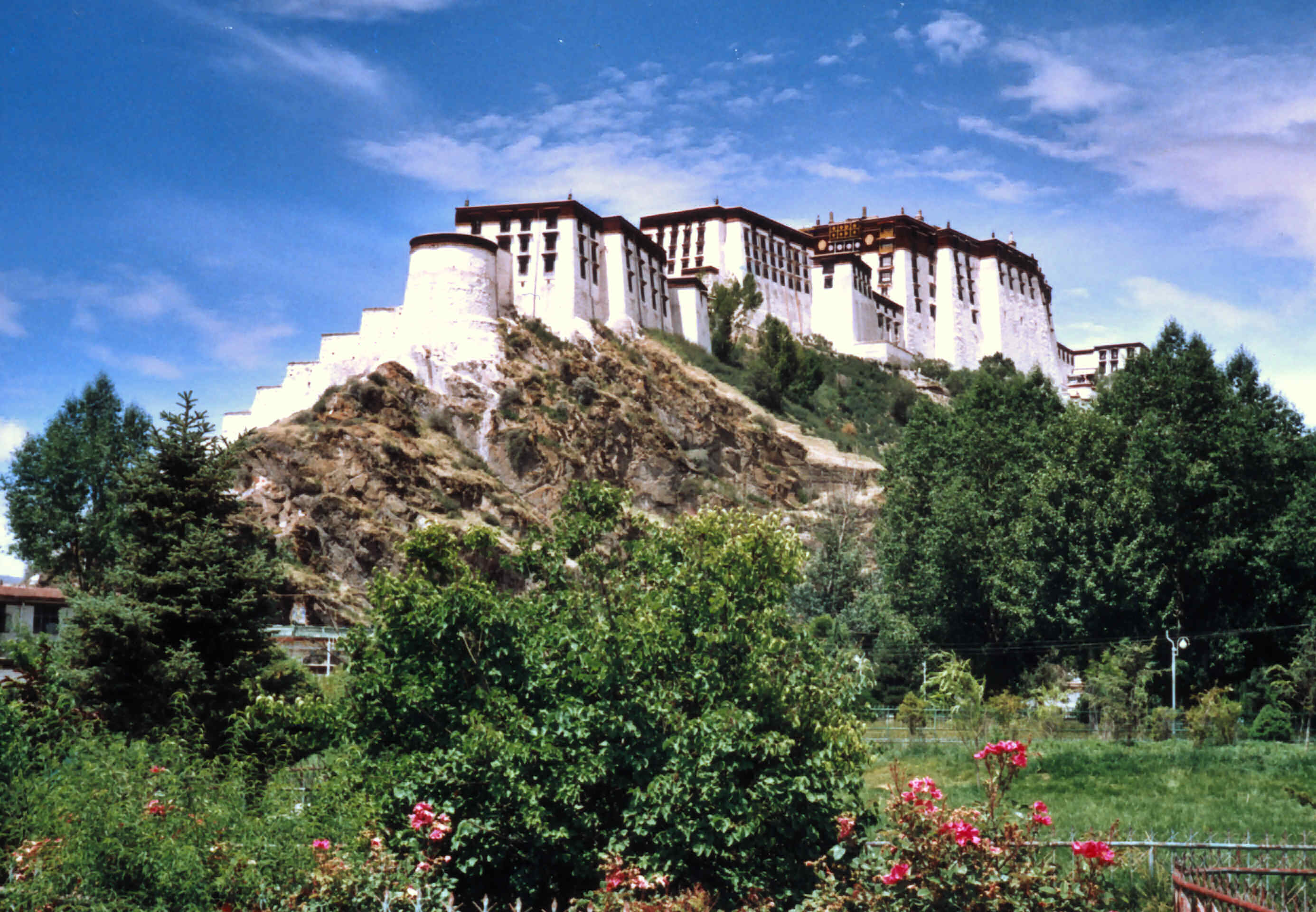
The Potala from behind: July, 2005.

The Fifth Dalai Lama began construction of the Potala Palace in 1645 after one of his spiritual advisors, Konchog Chophel (d. 1646), pointed out that the site would be an ideal seat of government, situated as it is between Drepung and Sera monasteries, and overlooking Songtsen Gampo's old capital city of Lhasa. The 5th Dalai Lama and his government moved into the Potrang Karpo – the White Palace – in 1649.

The initial phase of construction continued until 1694, some twelve years after the 5th Dalai Lama's death, which was kept secret from the general public for that length of time. The Potrang Marpo – or Red Palace – was added between 1690 and 1694.

==== Establishing Nechung as state oracle ====
The Fifth Dalai Lama formally institutionalized the Tibetan state oracle of Nechung. Lobsang Gyatso established Nechung Monastery as the seat of Tibet's state oracle by instituting Gyalpo Pehar as the protector of Tibet's newly consolidated Ganden Phodrang government. Nechung – which, translated literally, means "small place" – was a shrine dedicated to Pehar, located about ten minutes east on foot from Drepung monastery near Tibet's newly declared capital city of Lhasa.

The rôle of the three-headed, six-armed Pehar as protector of Tibet can be traced back to at least the 8th century, when Pehar was oath-bound by Padmasambhava to act as chief among Tibet's protector's, with Dorje Drakden named his chief emissary. The 5th Dalai Lama also composed a generation stage practice and invocation of the protector entitled simply Dra-Yang-Ma (Melodic Chant), which was incorporated into the ritual cycles of Nechung Monastery, where it continues to be practiced, up to the present day.

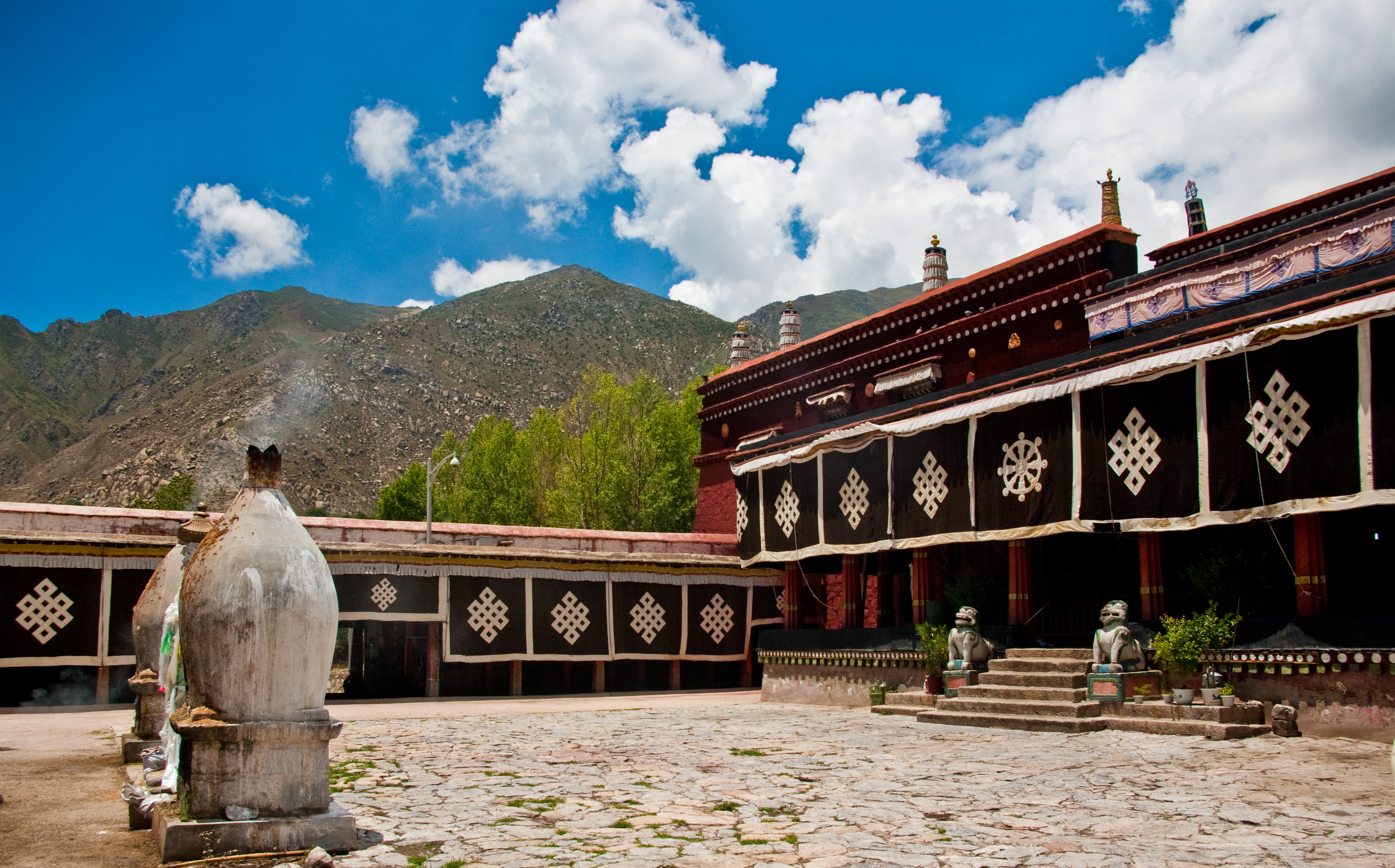
Main temple at Nechung Monastery, 2009.

===== Disposing of "perfidious spirit" Dolgyal =====
Nechung's role in warding off one interfering spirit in particular is quite extensively detailed in the 5th Dalai Lama's autobiography. Some contemporary scholars and the current 14th Dalai Lama would appear to agree: Lobsang Gyatso specifically states that a gyalpo (Tibetan: རྒྱལ་པོ་, Wylie: rgyal-po: a particular type of "very powerful, perfidious spirit") in the area of Dol Chumig Karmo had "...been harming the teaching of the Buddha and sentient beings in general and in particular" since at least the fire-bird year of 1657 (CE). The version of events which the 5th Dalai Lama relates is substantially corroborated by the account laid out in 1749 (CE) by Gelug historian Sumpa Khenpo (Tibetan: སུམ་པ་མཁན་པོ་ཡེ་ཤེས་དཔལ་འབྱོར་, Wylie: sum-pa mKhan-po ye-shes dpal-‘byor 1702–1788 CE). At any rate: confronted with the death of both people and cattle combined with harsh, unpredictable weather in an atmosphere of political intrigue and diplomatic insecurity, Gyatso undertook a specific course of action which might be considered somewhat unconventional, even for a religiously affiliated head of state.

At the end of the earth-bird year of 1669 (CE), a special crypt was constructed, and offerings placed within it in hopes that it might serve as a home in which the disturbed spirit of Drakpa Gyaltsen – an iconoclastic tulku and rival scholar who had died under mysterious circumstances at a time of considerable political turmoil – might finally settle. Reportedly, though, the evil spirit's harmful activities only intensified, manifesting (in part) as atmospheric disturbances including hailstorms, but also causing both people and cattle to fall prey to disease. The deaths of some monks were attributed to the spirit as well – which was named "Dolgyal" by combining gyalpo with the ghost's place of residence. It was only later that Dolgyal would come to be identified with Dorje Shugden (Tibetan: རྡོ་རྗེ་ཤུགས་ལྡན་, Wylie: rDo-rje Shugs-ldan) through conflation with a much older Sakya protector of the same name associated with the remote Nepali village of Tsap.

Modest but extensive offerings to monks of wheat and tea along with small amounts of gold reportedly resulted in sutra recitations numbering in the tens of thousands. Combined with the performance of many far more complex tantric rituals, the coordinated efforts reached eleven separate district capitals, and spread through no fewer than seventy monasteries including Dorje Drag, Sera, and Drepung. The entire cycle was concluded with an elaborate fire puja offering in which the "perfidious spirit" was ritually burnt by seven different groups of practitioners, led by

- Pema Trinley of Dorje Drag,
- Choegyal Terdag Lingpa (1646–1714, of Mindroling)
- Choeje Vugja Lungpa,
- Ngari Ngagchang Konchok Lhundup,
- Palri Tulku, and
- two separate groups of monks from Phende Lekshe Ling,

the Dalai Lamas' personal monastery (already known as Namgyal by that time). Thus invoking all of Tibet's dharma protectors – including Nechung – the 5th Dalai Lama charged them to "not support, protect, or give ... shelter" to Drakpa Gyaltsen in a formal promulgation which the current 14th Dalai Lama characterizes as "quite strongly worded".

Recalling the events of that time later, the 5th Dalai Lama wrote that "...indirectly these creatures..." – Tibetan: འབྱུང་པོ་, Wylie: ‘byung-po means, roughly, "creature" or "evil spirit" – "...were delivered to the peaceful state of being, released from having to experience the intolerable suffering of bad states of rebirth due to their increasingly negative actions." But the unification of Tibet having occurred at least in part on account of scapegoating the departed spirit of a controversial but popular rival lama was not to be without eventual historic consequence.

====== Later opposition on Shugden ======
The growth of the 19th-century nonsectarian Rime movement served in part to expose and exacerbate political tensions within the Gelug hierarchy as it had come to organize itself in the centuries following the 5th Dalai Lama's death. Some of his acts were subsequently misconstrued by certain conservative factions within the Gelug order as an "elevation" by Lobsang Gyatso of the dangerously volatile Dolgyal (by now, quite thoroughly conflated with the original Sakya protector named Shugden) to the status of Dharmapala – in other words: a particularly forceful emanation of a blissfully awakened Buddha's enlightened activity and therefore basically an enlightened being, himself.

The 13th Dalai Lama therefore sought to clarify his view about Dorje Shugden's status in his letter to Pabongkhapa Déchen Nyingpo, in which he identified Dorje Shugden as a "wrathful worldly spirit", the propitiation of which "contradicts the precepts of taking refuge". In reply, Phabongka (who is better remembered for his teachings on the graded stages of the path and reputation of conferring Kalachakra empowerments to large crowds of laypeople regardless of his having enthusiastically propitiated Shugden) acknowledged his "error". In the same letter, Phabongka said "...I have propitiated Shugden until now because my old mother told me that Shugden is the deity of my maternal lineage", thereby acknowledging Shugden practice's provincial and even familial (as well as Sakya) origins.

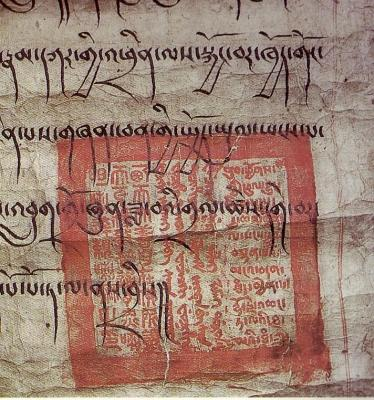
Official impression of trilingual (Manchurian, Chinese, and Tibetan) great seal of 5th Dalai Lama. Inscription (zhal-ris) translates to English as "Seal of the omniscient vajra holder la'i Ta-bla-ma, the excellent, fully-come-to-rest buddha of the West, lord of buddhist teachings in the world."

The current 14th Dalai Lama, for his part, continues to maintain it was the Fifth's intent to appease the interfering spirit of the Gyalpo class from Dol Chumig Karmo – hence his insistence on using the name "Dolgyal" to disambiguate a practice he disrecommends from one of a protector of the Sakya school to which he's tied through prior incarnations.

==== Resolving sectarian divides ====
Due largely to the determined cunning of his first regent Sonam Chöphel and the military support of his Mongolian disciple Güsri Khan, in 1642 the 25-year-old 5th Dalai Lama Lobsang Gyatso inherited military and political control of a nation that had been torn by over a century of power struggles and civil war characterized by factionalism and sectarian allegiances. The general form of government he instituted would remain largely in place until Tibet's military occupation by the People's Republic of China in the 1950s. Nevertheless, Lobsang Gyatso's rule over Tibet included various incidents which, 350 years later, certain keen observers – namely, the heirs of those Kagyupa followers whose patrons lost power during unification or during the quelling of their subsequent rebellions – still consider to have been the abuse of government power.

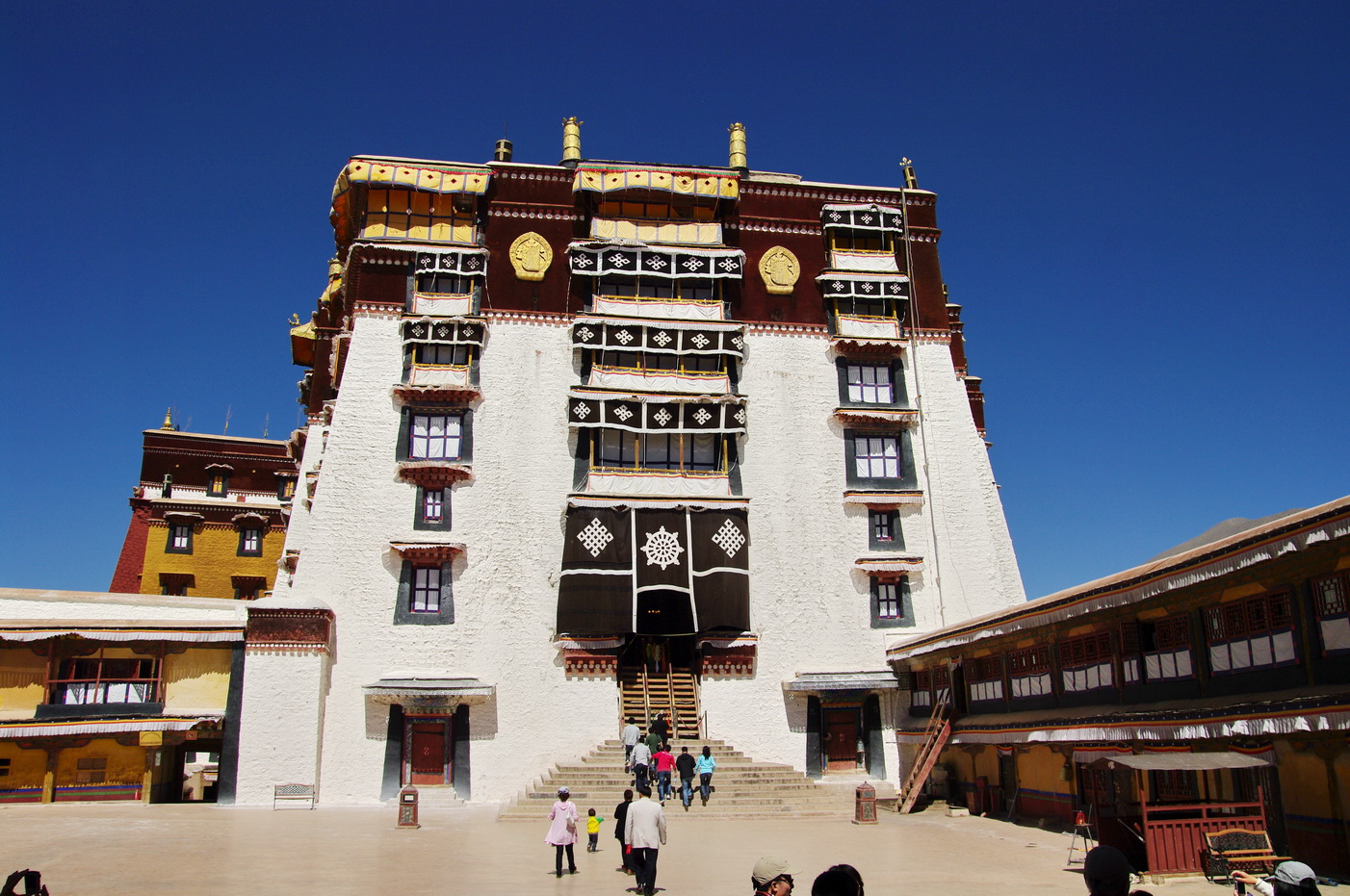
The Potala's white palace in Lhasa, the seat of Tibet's Ganden Phodrang government, built by the 5th Dalai Lama.

===== Specific grievances =====
====== Of the Kagyü and Bön traditions ======
In 1648, Tibetans loyal to the Gelug school reportedly joined Mongol forces in coercing monks of certain Kagyu and Bön institutions to embrace specifically Gelug doctrines. Modern Tibetans still differentiate between Bön and Buddhism in common parlance, calling members of the Nyingma, Sakya, Kagyu and Gelug schools nangpa (meaning "insider"), while referring to practitioners of Bön as bönpo.

====== Of the Jonang tradition ======
The Jonangpa order belongs to the Kagyupa group of schools, the 7th one to emerge. According to Snellgrove and Richardson, it was a difference in philosophy that caused a bitter schism to arise with the Gelugpa, however Samten Karmay maintains that the 5th Dalai Lama's negative attitude towards the Jonangpa was determined by political rather than philosophical or religious considerations. He records elsewhere that the Fifth Dalai Lama's personal biographer and Sanskrit teacher the renowned Jonang scholar Jamyang Wangyal Dorje Mondrowa was a master of the Jonang tradition and belonged to a well-known Jonang family from Lato in Tsang with whom the Dalai Lama had good relations. In any case, it was during Lobsang Gyatso's rule after the civil wars and rebellions of 1640-1643 that Jonangpa institutions, teachings and followers were banished and moved out of central Tibet to be re-established in Amdo for allying with the Tsangpa and fighting against the Ganden Phodrang. In 1650 the Jonangpa printing presses were officially sealed and teaching of their zhentong philosophical views was forbidden within central Tibet, indicating that the basis of the schism was more philosophical in nature. Then in 1658 the main Jonang monastery Takten Damchö Ling in Lhatse – which had been the monastic seat of the great Jonangpa exponent Taranatha (1575–1634) – was converted to a Gelug institution and renamed Phuntsok Choling.

===== Redress and reconciliation =====
The Fifth Dalai Lama's Regent or Desi, Sonam Rapten was, in fact, a fanatical Gelugpa supremacist as well as a shrewd and canny political operator with an eye for the main chance. Being 22 years the Dalai Lama's senior he dominated him as he raised him from the age of 5. In his autobiography The Dukula the lama repeatedly remarks how he had to defer to the Desi, or had to do as he said, and even as an adult he rarely got his way if he disagreed with Sonam Rapten's wishes.

That the infamous sectarian policies implemented in the decade after the 1642 civil war were the work of the Desi can be inferred from the decree that the Fifth Dalai Lama issued to him and his administration just as he departed to Beijing in the summer of 1652 to see the Emperor, leaving the Desi behind in Tibet. The issuance of such a decree, at the age of 35, indicates his growing maturity and his firm intention to start imposing his will over that of his Regent concerning such important policies which the Dalai Lama disapproved of. He presents this decree as his instructions to his regent in the form of a testament to be implemented while he was absent in China, and, perhaps, in case he did not return from the long and perilous journey for any reason. In The Dukula, he explains how, before departing, he handed to Sonam Rapten "for his memory, with explanations, a scroll of the following list concerning what was to be done (in my absence)". He then specifies what (amongst other things) this decree placed a ban on, and he thus ordered the reversal of specified sectarian policies being implemented, evidently without his approval, by the Desi's government:

"Around this time, the adepts of the Sakya, Kagyu and Nyingma schools were not allowed to wear hats in their own way, and it was intended that their religious affinities would gradually be converted to the Gelug. Many of our major and minor figures had given their approval for this and even made pleas (for this policy). If this was going to serve the interests of our [Gelugpa] school, it would most likely be good to have a unified school. However, to have a unified school would be beneficial neither to our own school nor to the others. In the long run it would come to: 'Whatever one does, the results of that action will ripen'. Therefore this was a gross policy that needed to be renounced, because there was little purpose in it: no conversion of the schools should be undertaken and no hat style to be changed; the bad example of the big schools preventing the small ones from recruiting new monks was to be discouraged."

====== With the Kagyü and Bön ======
In 1674, the 5th Dalai Lama met with 10th Karmapa (i.e., the specific tulku, or incarnate lama who heads the Karma Kagyu school) Chöying Dorje (1604–1674) at the Potala. This mutual gesture of "reconciliation" was reportedly "welcomed by both parties after the many conflicts and misunderstandings between 1612 and 1642".

When the 5th Dalai Lama issued the edict to appoint Sangye Gyatso as his Desi in 1679, in the same edict he also recognised the Yungdrung Bön as Tibet's native religion and describes it as being the "holder of secret mantras ".

====== With the Jonang ======
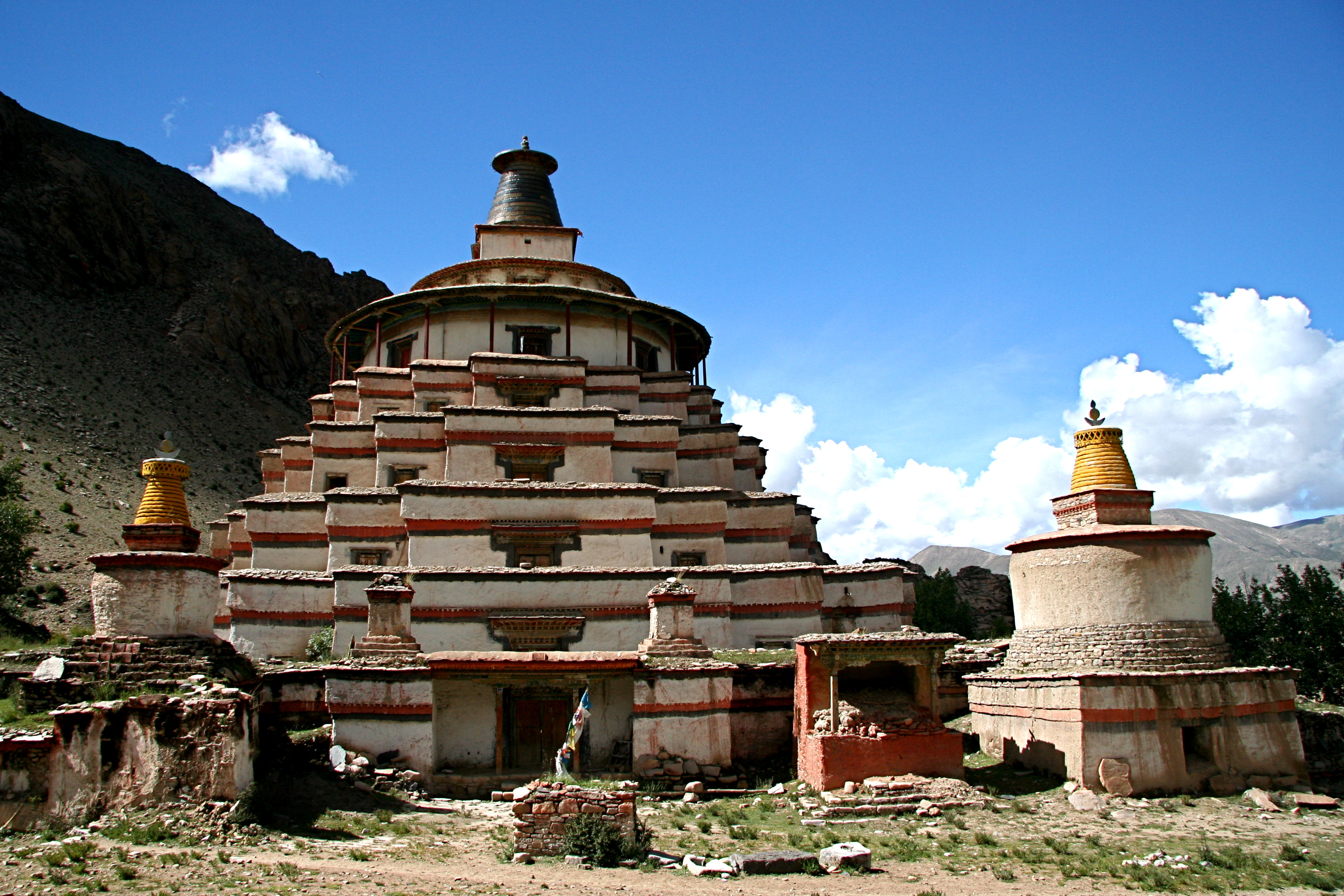
Stupa at Jomonang (U-Tsang, Lhatse, Tibet) completed in 1333 by Jonang founder Dolpopa (1292–1361). Courtesy Jonang Foundation © 2007.

There are some fairly subtle philosophical differences between the Jonang and Gelug schools' respective zhentong and rangtong views on voidness. After moving to Amdo the school's distinct transmission lineages of both zhentong philosophy and Dro Kalachakra completion stage practices could be preserved and survived intact to this day. In late 2001, the current 14th Dalai Lama reportedly composed an "Aspiration Prayer for the Flourishing of the Jonang Teachings" entitled in Tibetan: ཇོ་ནང་པའི་བསྟན་རྒྱས་སྨོན་ལམ་, Wylie: Jo-nang pa'i bStan rGyas sMon-lam (which might be called quite strongly worded).

==== Establishing pluralist theocracy ====
The 5th Dalai Lama Ngawang Lobsang Gyatso established a centralized dual system of government under the Gyalwa Rinpoche (i.e., the institution of the Dalai Lama) which was divided equally between laymen and monks (both Gelugpa and Nyingmapa). This form of government, with few changes, survived up to modern times. He also revitalized the Lhasa Mönlam, the capital city's New Year Festival, which had originally been created by the reformer Je Tsongkhapa in 1409 (CE).

It was under Gyatso's rule that the "rule of religion" was finally firmly established "even to the layman, to the nomad, or to the farmer in his fields". This was not the supremacy of the Gelug school over Bön, or over the other Buddhist schools, but "the dedication of an entire nation to a religious principle".

=== Foreign relations ===
- Fifth Dalai Lama Ngawang Lobsang Gyatso was the first Dalai Lama to accept an invitation from an emperor of China to visit the Chinese capital city of Beijing.
- Three separate expeditions known from European sources to have visited Tibet did so during the 5th Dalai Lama's lifetime; and he met with members of the third of these.

==== Establishing relations with China ====
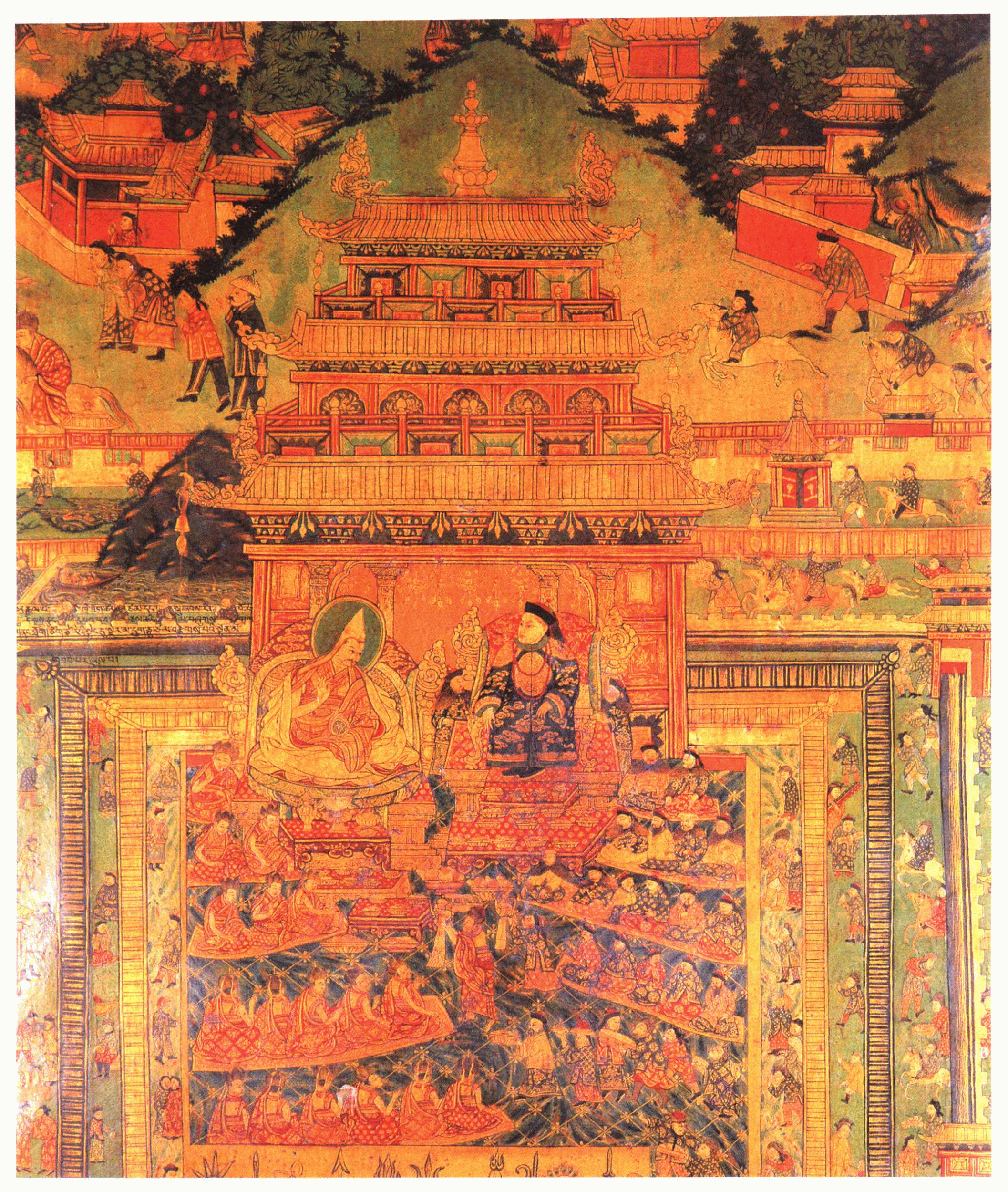
Qing dynasty painting of the 5th Dalai Lama meeting the Shunzhi Emperor in Beijing, 1653.

The 5th Dalai Lama's official visit, as an independent head of state, to Beijing in 1653 should be understood in the context of the prior relationship which existed between China and Tibet.

===== History of mutual independence =====
Earlier invitations to visit the Manchu court in Beijing had been turned down by both 3rd Dalai Lama Sonam Gyatso and 4th Dalai Lama Yonten Gyatso. Analyzing the Ming emperors' repeated invitations of Tibetan lamas from various schools, contemporary Buddhist scholar Alexander Berzin says that "requests by the Ming emperors for Tibetan lamas to visit China and the freedom the lamas exercised in responding to these requests, characterize the Sino Tibetan relationship at this time as one of mutual independence."

===== Diplomatic envoy to Beijing =====
Fifth Dalai Lama Lobsang Gyatso established diplomatic relations with the second emperor of the Qing dynasty, accepting the Shunzhi Emperor's 1649 invitation. The Shunzhi Emperor invited him to Beijing instead of Mongolia, following the advice of his Han advisors over the suggestion by his Manchu advisors. The 5th Dalai Lama set out from Lhasa in 1652 accompanied by 3,000 men. The journey to Beijing took nine months. Lobsang Gyatso and his entourage spent two months in the yellow palace which had been especially constructed by the emperor in order to house him.

The Shunzhi Emperor, who was only 14 years old (13 by Western reckoning) at the time, first met the Dalai Lama in January 1653, honouring him with two grand imperial receptions. Some historians claim that the emperor treated the Dalai Lama as an equal while others dispute this claim. The emperor gave Gyatso a parting gift of an elaborate gold seal reading "Dalai Lama, Overseer of the Buddhist Faith on Earth Under the Great Benevolent Self-subsisting Buddha of the Western Paradise". However the Fifth Dalai Lama did not accept it. He wrote that after he left Beijing on his way back to Tibet, "the emperor made his men bring a golden seal for me" but "The Tibetan version of the inscription of the seal was translated by a Mongolian translator but was not a good translation." Furthermore, when he arrived back in Tibet, he discarded the emperor's famous golden seal and made a new one for important Tibetan state usage, writing in his autobiography: "Leaving out the Chinese characters that were on the seal given by the emperor, a new seal was carved for stamping documents that dealt with territorial issues. The first imprint of the seal was offered with prayers to the image of Lokeshvara ...".

The event is described in Samten Karmay's account as follows:

"Just a few days before his departure for Tibet, a gold seal with a gold plaque engraved with a decree were hastily sent to him from Peking. The imperial functionaries had not dared present the seal in front of the Emperor to the Dalai Lama while he was officially visiting Peking as head of state of a foreign country. Since the seal was offered to the Dalai Lama with no particular form of protocol, he attached little importance to it. He simply remarks in his autobiography that the Tibetan translation of the title engraved on the seal was very poor. The seal, however, is currently exploited by the Chinese authorities for propaganda purposes to justify their policy towards Tibet."

The White Dagoba at Beihai Park was constructed to honour his visit.

==== European missionaries in Tibet ====
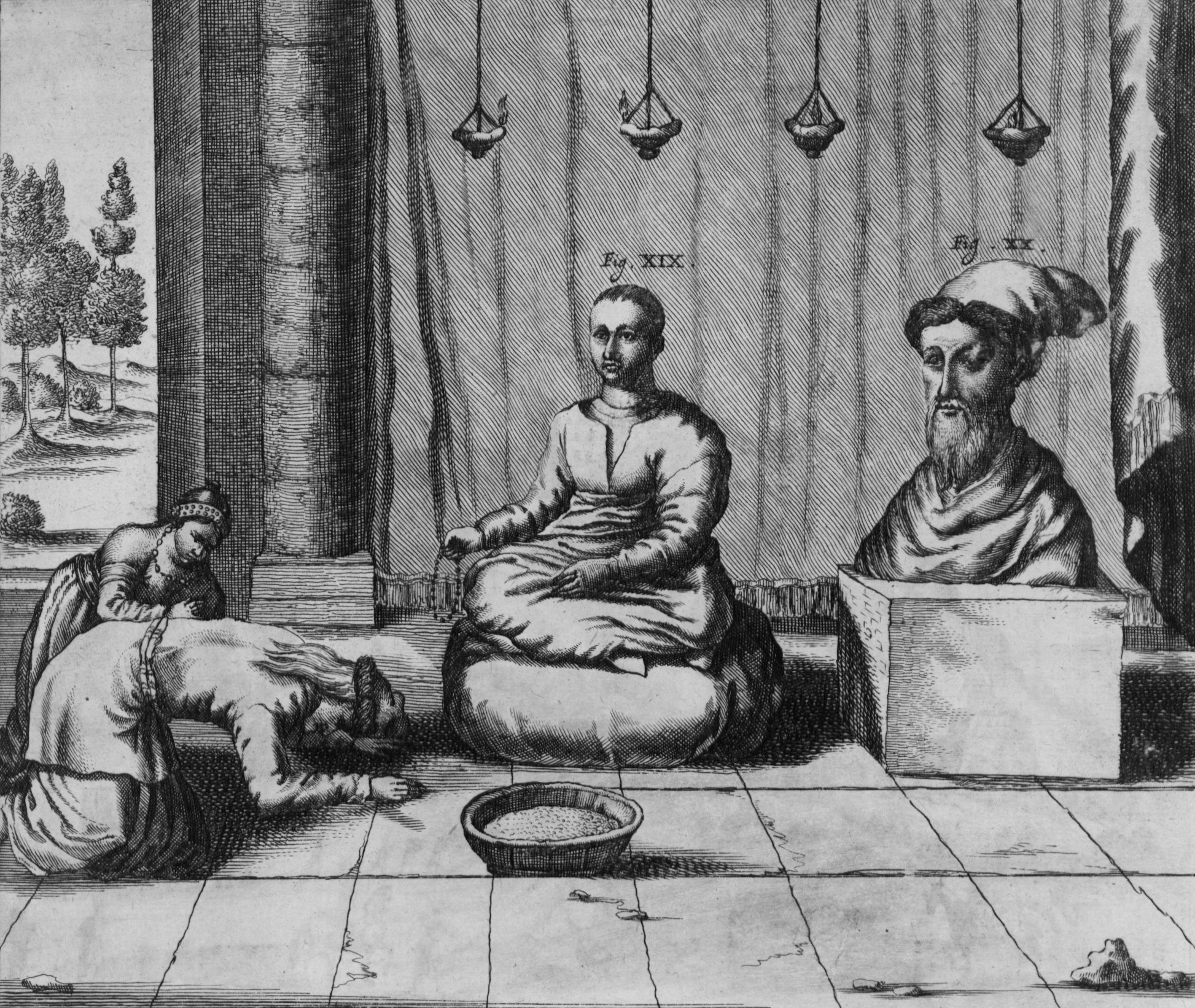
Contemporary Western engraving of 5th Dalai Lama, figure XIX, Latin caption translates "The figure of the great Lama, or the Eternal Father". Bust caption for figure XX translates "The late king Han of Tanguth is worshipped with divine honors"; thus more likely depicts Altan Khan of Tümed than Güshi Khan. Based on reports by Johannes Grueber of his 1661 visit to Lhasa. A. Kircher, China Illustrata, 1667.

The first documented Europeans to arrive in Tibet may have been the Portuguese Jesuit missionaries, António de Andrade and Manuel Marques who did so in either July or August 1624, when the 5th Dalai Lama would have been about seven or eight years old.

===== Jesuit missions in Tibet =====
While the first two Jesuit mission churches to be established in Tibet followed in direct result of Andrade and Marques' 1624 visit, neither would remain to see the 1642 enthronement of 5th Dalai Lama Lobsang Gyatso at Samdruptse castle in Shigatse as the temporal ruler of Tibet.

====== First Jesuit mission at Tsaparang ======
Andrade and Marques were reportedly welcomed warmly by the King and Queen of Guge, becoming the first documented Europeans to enter Tibet. Staying in Tibet for only a month, Andrade and Marques would return to Agra, India by November 1624 to organize a mission trip for the following year. In 1625, with the full support of the King and Queen of Guge, Andrade and Marques established a permanent mission at Tsaparang, in the Garuda Valley of western Tibet's Ngari region.

====== Second Jesuit mission at Shigatse ======
On Andrade's advice, a second Jesuit mission was dispatched to southern Tibet from India in 1627. The Portuguese missionaries João Cabral and Estêvão Cacella were reportedly welcomed at Shigatse by the King of Ü-Tsang, and Cabral and Cacella established their mission there in 1628. Cabral and Cacella provided the first information to reach the West about the mystical country of Shambhala (which they transcribed as "Xembala") in their reports back to India.

====== Evacuation of Jesuit missions ======
Both of the Portuguese missions were evacuated in 1635 after becoming embroiled in the power struggles for control of Tibet at that time. It would be twenty-five years before the next documented Europeans visited Tibet.

===== Third Jesuit expedition =====
The first Europeans to meet a Dalai Lama were probably the two Jesuits, Johannes Grueber of Austria and Albert Dorville (D’Orville). In 1661, Grueber and D'Orville travelled through Lhasa on their way from Beijing to Agra, India on an Imperial Passport. It is this expedition from which another jesuit priest Athanasius Kircher's 1667 engraving in China Illustrata (purported to depict 5th Dalai Lama Lobsang Gyatso) is derived, based on expedition journals and charts left to him by Grueber.

== Death and succession ==
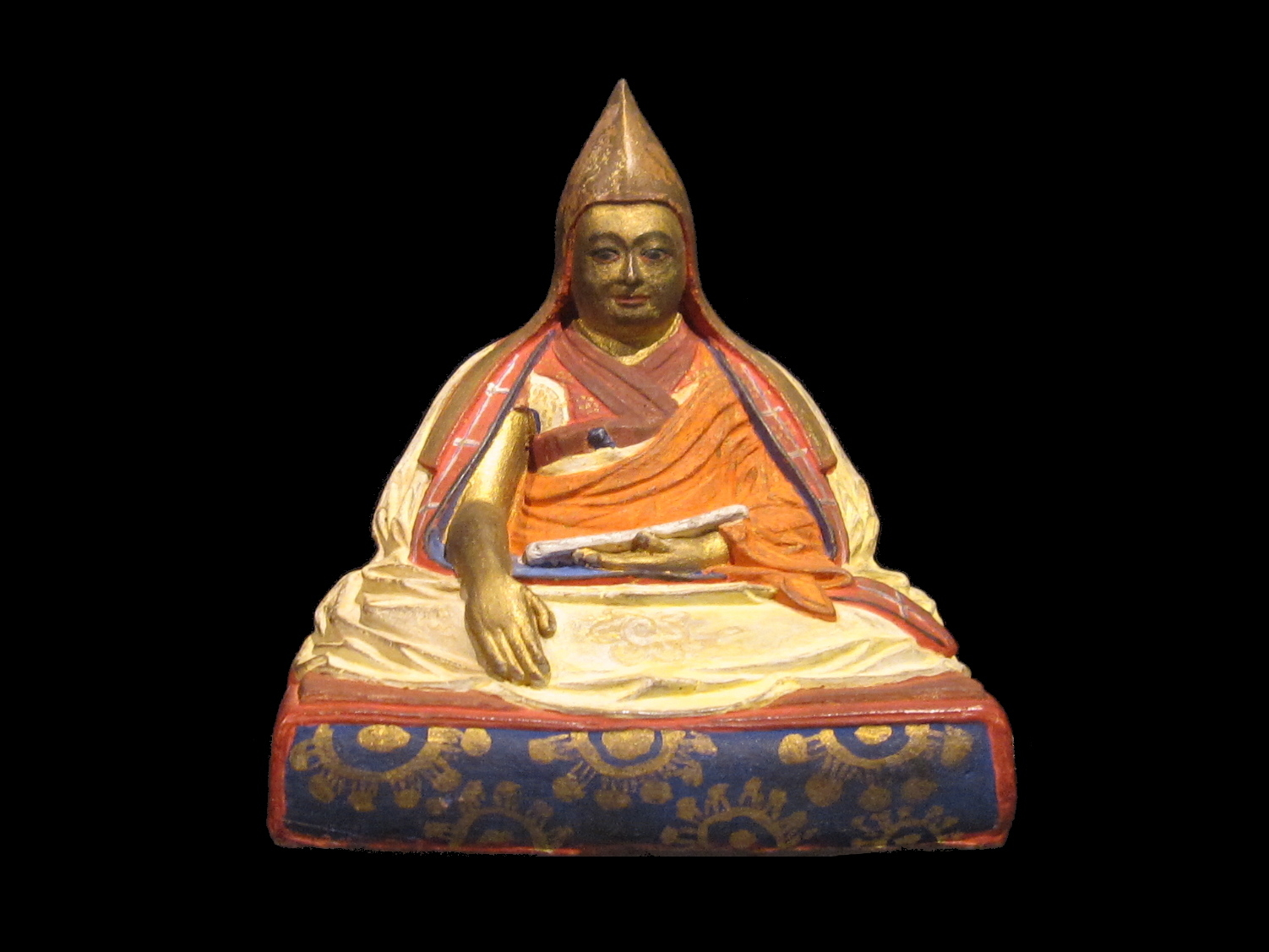
Statue portrait of 5th Dalai Lama. Mongolia, 19th century.

The death of the Fifth Dalai Lama in 1682 at the age of 65 was kept hidden until 1696 by Desi Sangye Gyatso, his Prime Minister, and, according to persistent rumours, his son, whom he had appointed in 1679. This was done so that the Potala Palace could be finished and to prevent Tibet's neighbors taking advantage of an interregnum in the succession of the Dalai Lamas. Desi Sangay Gyatso also served as regent until the assumption of power by the Sixth Dalai Lama.

"In order to complete the Potala Palace, Desi Sangye Gyatso carried out the wishes of the Fifth Dalai Lama and kept his death a secret for fifteen years. People were told that the Great Fifth was continuing his long retreat. Meals were taken to his chamber and on important occasions the Dalai Lama's ceremonial gown was placed on the throne. However, when Mongol princes insisted on having an audience, an old monk called Depa Deyab of Namgyal monastery, who resembled the Dalai Lama, was hired to pose in his place. He wore a hat and an eye shade to conceal the fact that he lacked the Dalai Lama's piercing eyes. The Desi managed to maintain this charade till he heard that a boy in Mon exhibited remarkable abilities. He sent his trusted attendants to the area and, in 1688, the boy [the future 6th Dalai Lama] was brought to Nankartse near lake Yardog Yutsho in the south. There he was educated by teachers appointed by the Desi until 1697...."

== Reception ==
In 17th-century Tibet, after centuries of bitter rivalry the Gelug superseded the older sects as the country's pre-eminent religious-political power. Bitterness and controversial accusations from heirs of older sects, who lost power and prestige, still persist today.

Elliot Sperling notes that the "standard image" of the Dalai Lamas as "Nobel Peace Prize laureate[s]" is a contemporary perception, referring to the 5th Dalai Lama's involvement in military action to establish and maintain the worldly power of the Dalai Lamas. (Note: Sperling refers to the conflict with Tsangpa Desi in 1638/39, and the Mongol Gusri Qan's military intervention in 1640/41; and to a rebellion in Tsang in early 1660. With respect to the 1660 rebellion, Sperling quotes an invocative prayer by the 5th Dalai Lama, which he interprets as "a clear determination to unleash severe military retribution against those who had risen against his authority." In fact, the passage quoted was merely an invocation prayer to a spirit to subdue two treasonous Gelugpa officers, Depa Norbu and Gonashakpa Ngodrub, who had absconded from their posts in Lhasa, seized the castle at Shigatse and tried to foment a rebellion. After the Tibetan translator of the 5th Dalai Lama's autobiography Samten Karmay confirmed the correct context in 2016, Sperling admitted his mistake and added a note to 'Note 5' of his essay to explain. The note says: 'Note by Elliot Sperling, Feb. 4, 2016: "Rather than indicating military action, as the original article mistakenly implied, the missive from the 5th Dalai Lama was addressed to a protector deity and sought the punishments that are mentioned therein via divine means. I’m grateful to Samten Karmay for pointing this out and to Sean Jones for spurring further inquiry. ES'")

== His writings ==
Lobsang Gyatso was a prolific writer and respected scholar, who wrote in a free style which allowed him to frankly – and sometimes, ironically – express his own deepest feelings and independent interpretations. His canonical works total 24 volumes, in all.

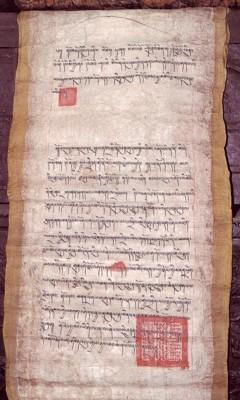
Legal document showing traditional application of two of the 5th Dalai Lama's official seals, 1676 (CE).

=== Autobiography ===
Lobsang Gyatso left an autobiography – entitled in Tibetan: ཟ་ཧོར་གྱི་བན་དེ་ངག་དབང་བློ་བཟང་རྒྱ་མཚོའི་འདི་སྣང་འཁྲུལ་བའི་རོལ་རྩེད་རྟོགས་བརྗོད་ཀྱི་ཚུལ་དུ་བཀོད་པ་དུ་ཀུ་ལའི་གོས་བཟང་, Wylie: Za hor gyi ban de ngag dbang blo bzang rgya mtsho'i 'di snang 'khrul ba'i rol rtsed rtogs brjod kyi tshul du bkod pa du ku la'i gos bzang – but far more commonly referred to simply as Dukulai Gosang – in which, according to Samten Gyaltsen Karmay, he wrote:

The official Tsawa Kachu of the Ganden Palace showed me statues and rosaries (that belonged to the Fourth Dalai Lama and other lamas), but I was unable to distinguish between them! When he left the room I heard him tell the people outside that I had successfully passed the tests. Later, when he became my tutor, he would often admonish me and say: "You must work hard, since you were unable to recognize the objects!"

Despite what he wrote above himself later in life, three different English-language histories attest that he was subjected to an earlier object-recognition test, in 1619, when Sonam Rapten, the Chandzeu, went to his family home at Chonggye in great secrecy (since the king had banned the search for the Trulku) to confirm information he had received about the boy. He took with him a number of the late Yonten Gyatsho's personal belongings (specifically, the Fourth Dalai Lama's personal samta boards, vajra, bell and porcelain bowls all mixed with identical items belonging to others) to submit the less-than two year old candidate to a private recognition test, presumably in front of his family, which the boy passed without any difficulty. It is supposed that everyone present was sworn to secrecy, and that the Dalai Lama did not refer to this test in his autobiography because it occurred when he was not more than two years old and he would have forgotten about it.

This autobiography has been a rich source of information for research on this period of Tibetan history by scholars and writers. ‘Dukula’ affords a detailed and objective account of daily events in the author's life which permits the reader to envision a panoramic view of Lhasan and Tibetan society through most of the 17th century. By 1681 Lobsang Gyatso personally wrote three volumes and his last Regent Desi Sangye Gyatso added another two after his master's death in 1682. These 5 volumes "represent the most important – in both size and content – document of Tibetan autobiographical literature in existence, since they include the memories of two of the greatest statesmen of Tibet".

He also wrote in his autobiography that "When I finished the Oral teachings of Manjushri [in 1658], I had to leave the ranks of the Gelug. Today [in 1674], having completed the Oral teachings of the Knowledge-holders, I will probably have to withdraw from the Nyingma ranks as well!"

=== Religious texts ===
The Thukdrup Yang Nying Kundü or "Union of All Innermost Essences" (Tibetan: ཐུགས་སྒྲུབ་ཡང་སྙིང་ཀུན་འདུས་, Wylie: thugs sgrub yang snying kun 'dus) sadhana of Padmasambhava's Eight Manifestations comes from a "pure vision" (Tibetan: དག་སྣང་, Wylie: dag snang) terma of the 5th Dalai Lama. It is contained in his Sangwa Gyachen (Tibetan: གསང་བ་རྒྱ་ཅན་, Wylie: gsang ba rgya can). (Both the sadhana and its related empowerment texts were arranged by Jamyang Khyentse Wangpo.)

=== Historical texts ===
The 5th Dalai Lama "enthusiastically" wrote a detailed history of Tibet at the request of Güshi Khan in 1643.

== Sources ==
- Bell, Sir Charles (1946). Portrait of the Dalai Lama Wm. Collins, London. 1st edition. (1987) Wisdom Publications, London. ISBN 086171055X
- Karmay, Samten G. (2014). The Illusive Play: The Autobiography of the Fifth Dalai Lama. Serindia Publications. Chicago. ISBN 978-1-932476675.
- Haines, R Spencer (2018). "Charismatic Authority in Context: An Explanation of Guushi Khan's Swift Rise to Power in the Early 17th Century". Mongolica: An International Journal of Mongolian Studies. 52. International Association of Mongolists: 24–31.
- Karmay, Samten G. (1988, reprint 1998). Secret Visions of the Fifth Dalai Lama. London: Serindia Publications, Some additional information. ISBN 0906026202.
- Karmay, Samten G. (1998). The Fifth Dalai Lama and his Reunification of Tibet. Chapter 29 of: The Arrow and the Spindle, Studies in History, Myths, Rituals and Beliefs in Tibet. Revised edition 2009. Kathmandu, Nepal, Mandala Book Point. ISBN 9789994655106.
- Karmay, Samten G. (2005, reprint edition 2014). The Arrow and the Spindle, Studies in History, Myths, Rituals and Beliefs in Tibet. Volume II. Kathmandu, Nepal, Mandala Book Point. ISBN 999331028X.
- Karmay, Samten G. (2005). The Great Fifth – International Institute of Asian Studies, Leiden, Netherlands; Newsletter #39 Winter 2005, pp. 12–13.
- Laird, Thomas (2006). The Story of Tibet : Conversations with the Dalai Lama (1st ed.). New York: Grove Press. ISBN 978-0-8021-1827-1.
- Mullin, Glenn H. (2001). The Fourteen Dalai Lamas: A Sacred Legacy of Reincarnation, pp. 184–237. Clear Light Publishers. Santa Fe, New Mexico. ISBN 1-57416-092-3.
- Norbu, Thubten Jigme; Turnbull, Colin M. (1968). Tibet. New York: Simon and Schuster. ISBN 0-671-20559-5.
- Pommaret, Françoise, ed. (2003) Lhasa in the 17th Century; The Capital of the Dalai Lamas. Brill. Leiden, Netherlands. ISBN 9004128662
- Richardson, Hugh E. (1984). Tibet and its history (2nd ed., rev. and updated. ed.). Boston: Shambhala. ISBN 978-0877733768.
- Shakabpa, Tsepon W.D. (1967), Tibet: A Political History. New York: Yale University Press, and (1984), Singapore: Potala Publications. ISBN 0961147415.
- Shakabpa, Tsepon W.D. (2010). One Hundred Thousand Moons. An Advanced Political History of Tibet (2 vols). Leiden (Netherlands), Boston (USA): Brill's Tibetan Studies Library. ISBN 9789004177321.
- Snellgrove, David; Richardson, Hugh (1986). A Cultural History of Tibet. Boston & London: Shambala Publications Inc. ISBN 0877733546.
- Stein, R. A. (1972). Tibetan civilization (English ed.). Stanford, Calif.: Stanford Univ. Press. ISBN 0-8047-0901-7.

Buddhist titles
Preceded by Yonten Gyatso	Dalai Lama; 1642–1682; Recognized in 1618	Succeeded by Tsangyang Gyatso
