= A History of Tibet by the Fifth Dalai Lama of Tibet =

A History of Tibet by the Fifth Dalai Lama of Tibet (Tibetan: བོད་ཀྱི་དེབ་ཐེར་དཔྱིད་ཀྱི་རྒྱལ་མོའི་གླུ་དབྱངས་, Wylie: bod kyi deb ther dpyid kyi rgyal mo'i glu dbyangs) is a historical work written by Ngawang Lobsang Gyatso, the 5th Dalai Lama who ruled Tibet from 1617 to 1682. The 5th Dalai Lama wrote this book at the request of Güshi Khan in 1643.

== Published ==
- ngag dbang blo bzang rgya mtsho: bod kyi deb ther dpyid kyi rgyal mo’i glu dbyangs. Kapitel 2 und 3. Übersetzung von Zahiruddin Ahmad ins Englische: A History of Tibet by the Fifth Dalai Lama of Tibet (Bloomington, Indiana University 1995), ISBN 0-933070-32-2 (jstor.org)
