= Duldzin Dragpa Gyaltsen =

Tibetan Buddhist scholar (1374–1434)

Tibetan name
- Tibetan: དུལ་འཛིན་གྲགས་པ་རྒྱལ་མཚན
Transcriptions
- Wylie: dul 'dzin grags pa rgyal mtshan

Chinese name
- Simplified Chinese: 堆增·扎巴坚赞
Transcriptions

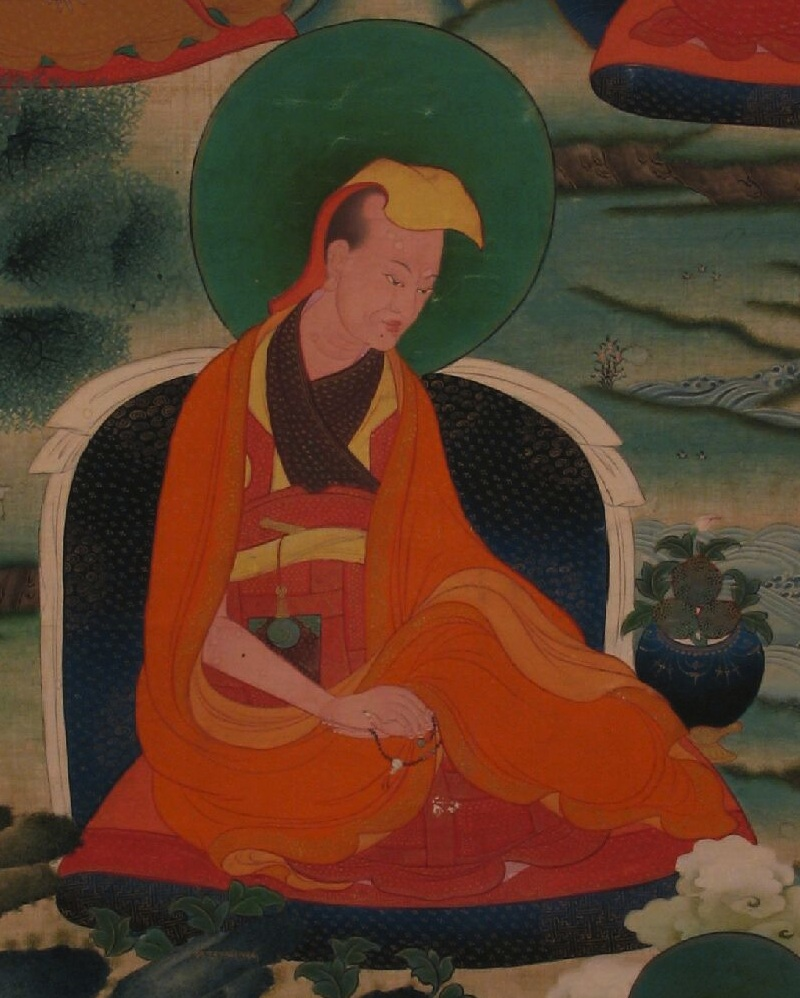
Duldzin Drakpa Gyeltsen

Duldzin Dragpa Gyaltsen (1374-1434), the first Kyorlung Ngari Tulku, was one of the principal disciples of Je Tsongkhapa, the founder of the Gelugpa school of Tibetan Buddhism.

Duldzin Dragpa Gyaltsen is renowned for his strict adherence to the Vinaya or Buddhist monastic code as well as for his survey of the Sarvadurgatipariśodhana Tantra.

Dragpa Gyaltsen was the founder of Tsunmo Tsal (btsun mo tshal) monastery in Tagtse Dzong (stag rtse rdzong), Central Tibet.

His students included Jamyang Choje Tashi Palden (1379-1449), the founder of Drepung Monastery, and most of the other important Gelug masters of the time.

== Subsequent re-births ==
- Charchen Chödrak (ཆར་ཆེན་ཆོས་གྲགས་)
- Panchen Sönam Drakpa (པཎ་ཆེན་བསོད་ནམས་གྲགས་པ་) [1478—1554]
- Sönam Yéshé Wangpo (བསོད་ནམས་ཡེ་ཤེས་དབང་པོ་)
- Ngakwang Sönam Gélek Pelzang (ངག་དབང་བསོད་ནམས་དགེ་ལེགས་དཔལ་བཟང་)
- Tulku Drakpa Gyeltsen (སྤྲུལ་སྐུ་གྲགས་པ་རྒྱལ་མཚན་)
- Ngakwang Jinpa Jamyang Tenpé Gyeltsen (ངག་དབང་སྦྱིན་པ་འཇམ་དབྱངས་བསྟན་པའི་རྒྱལ་མཚན་)
- Lozang Tashi (བློ་བཟང་བཀྲ་ཤིས་)
- Lozang Gélek Drakpa (བློ་བཟང་དགེ་ལེགས་གྲགས་པ་)
- Lozang Jikmé Tenpé Gyeltsen (བློ་བཟང་འཇིགས་མེད་བསྟན་པའི་རྒྱལ་མཚན་)
- Ngakwang Tsültrim Tenpé Gyeltsen (ངག་དབང་ཚུལ་ཁྲིམས་བསྟན་པའི་རྒྱལ་མཚན་)
- Khédrup Tendzin Chökyi Nyima (མཁས་གྲུབ་བསྟན་འཛིན་ཆོས་ཀྱི་ཉི་མ་)
- Ngakwang Lozang Khédrup Tendzin Gyatso (ངག་དབང་བློ་བཟང་མཁས་གྲུབ་བསྟན་འཛིན་རྒྱ་མཚོ་)
- Tendzin Chögyel (བསྟན་འཛིན་ཆོས་རྒྱལ་) [b.1946]

== Works ==
- dul ba'i bslab bya chen mo -on the Vinaya rules of monastic discipline.
- kun rig rnam bshad - a survey of the Sarvadurgatipariśodhana Tantra
