= Panchen Sonam Dragpa =

Fifteenth Ganden Tripa (1478–1554)

Panchen Sonam Dragpa (Tibetan: པན་ཆེན་བསོད་ནམས་གྲགས་པ, Wylie: Pan-chen bSod-nams grags-pa) (1478–1554) was the fifteenth Ganden Tripa or throneholder of Ganden Monastery. His texts form the core curriculum for the Loseling College of Drepung Monastic University, the Shartse College of the Ganden Monastic University, and several other Gelugpa monasteries. He was taught by the second Dalai Lama and in turn later became the teacher of the third Dalai Lama.

== Abbotship ==
Panchen Sonam Dragpa was unique in having served as abbot of the three main Gelug monasteries – Ganden, Sera and Drepung. According to Kelsang Gyatso, "He is the only person ever to have received this honour."

In 1526, at the request of the second Dalai Lama, he became Drepung Loseling's abbot and taught there for about six years. From 1529 to 1535, he served as Ganden Monastery's 15th abbot. In 1542, he became abbot of Sera Monastery.

== Scholarship ==
Panchen Sonam Dragpa's collected works spans fourteen volumes, constituting the main textbooks still used today in the educational curriculum for "the Loseling College, the Shartse College of the Ganden Monastic University, in many monasteries of Kham and Amdo provinces of Tibet as well as in some monasteries in Mongolia." The monks at these monasteries "qualify for their Geshe degrees by relying principally upon the works of this great Teacher."

Dr. Ursula Bernis summarizes Panchen Sonam Dragpa's accomplishments: "a great master, writer, abbot of all monastic universities in turn, vajrayana adept, whose textbooks are still today used at Drepung" and "the teacher of two Dalai Lamas." McCune adds that, in regards to his subsequent incarnations, "to be known as the incarnation of Panchen Sonam Drakpa would likely have been considered a great honor."

== Reincarnation lineage ==
Duldzin Dragpa Gyaltsen (1350-1413), one of the eight main disciples of Je Tsongkhapa (the founder of the Gelugpa order), was considered to be a previous incarnation of Panchen Sonam Dragpa. According to Kelsang Gyatso it was Duldzin Dragpa Gyaltsen who built Ganden Monastery. but other sources do not confirm this. His student Jamyang Choje Tashi Palden (1379-1449), founded of Drepung Monastery.

Panchen Sonam Dragpa also became known as an incarnation of the great lama and historian Buton Rinchen Drub.

In 1539, Panchen Sonam Dragpa was enthroned as the first tulku of the Upper Chamber (Zimkhang Gong, Wylie: gzims-khang gong-ma) at Drepung Monastery.

This reincarnation lineage is thought to have ended with the violent death of Tulku Dragpa Gyaltsen (1619-1656), but followed by his manifestation as the Dharma Protector Dorje Shugden.

== Bibliography ==
Bsod-nams-grags-pa, Martin J. Boord, and L. N. Tsonawa. 1996. Overview of Buddhist tantra: general presentation of the classes of tantra, captivating the minds of the fortunate ones (Rgyud sde spyi'i rnam par bzhags pa skal bzang gi yid 'phrog ces bye ba bzhugs so). Dharamsala: Library of Tibetan Works and Archives.
