= Mount Gephel =

Mountain in Tibet, China

Coordinates: 29°40′41″N 91°01′36″E

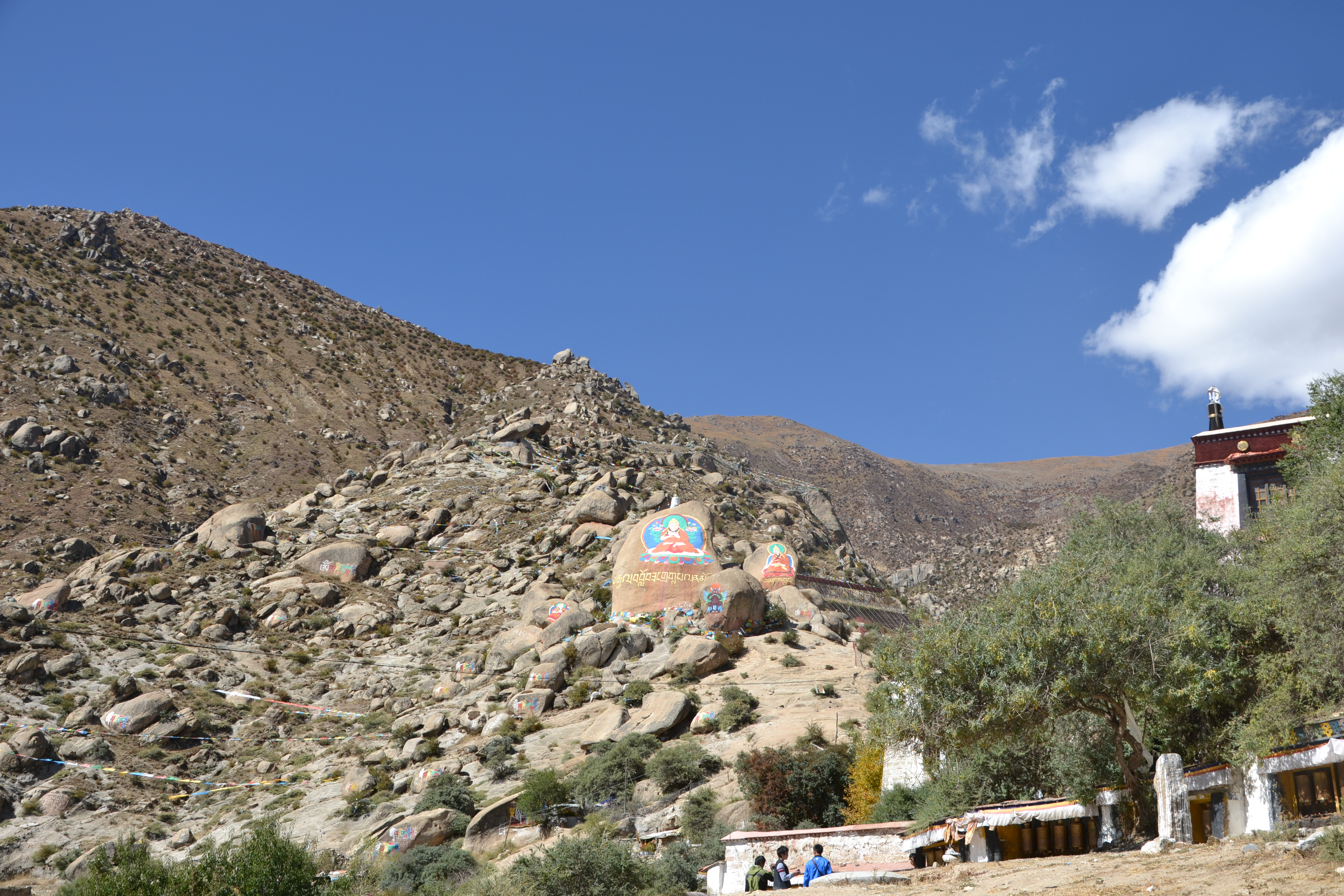
Mount Gephel

Mount Gephel (Tibetan: དགེ་འཕེལ།, Wylie: Dge-'phel; simplified Chinese: 更丕乌孜山, 根培乌孜山; traditional Chinese: 更丕烏孜山; pinyin: Gèngpīwūzī Shān) or Genpei Utse (Zengshang Peak), is a small Tibetan mountain located 8 kilometers west of Lhasa in Tibet. Drepung Monastery lies at its foot.

The highest point of Mount Gephel is 5400 meters. There is a site in the mountainside, whenever the June 4 as the "mountain turning festival" in Tibetan calendar, thousands of believers in Lhasa would come to Mount Gephel for pilgrimaging to Buddha.
