= Drepung Monastery =

Tibetan Buddhist monastery at Mount Gephel, Tibet, China

- Tibetan transcription(s); Tibetan: འབྲས་སྤུངས་ Wylie transliteration: ’bras spungs Pronunciation in IPA: [[ˈtʂɛpuŋ]] Official transcription (China): Zhaibung; THL: Drepung; Other transcriptions: Dräpung, Drebung; Chinese transcription(s); Traditional: 哲蚌寺; Simplified: 哲蚌寺; Pinyin: Zhébàng Sì
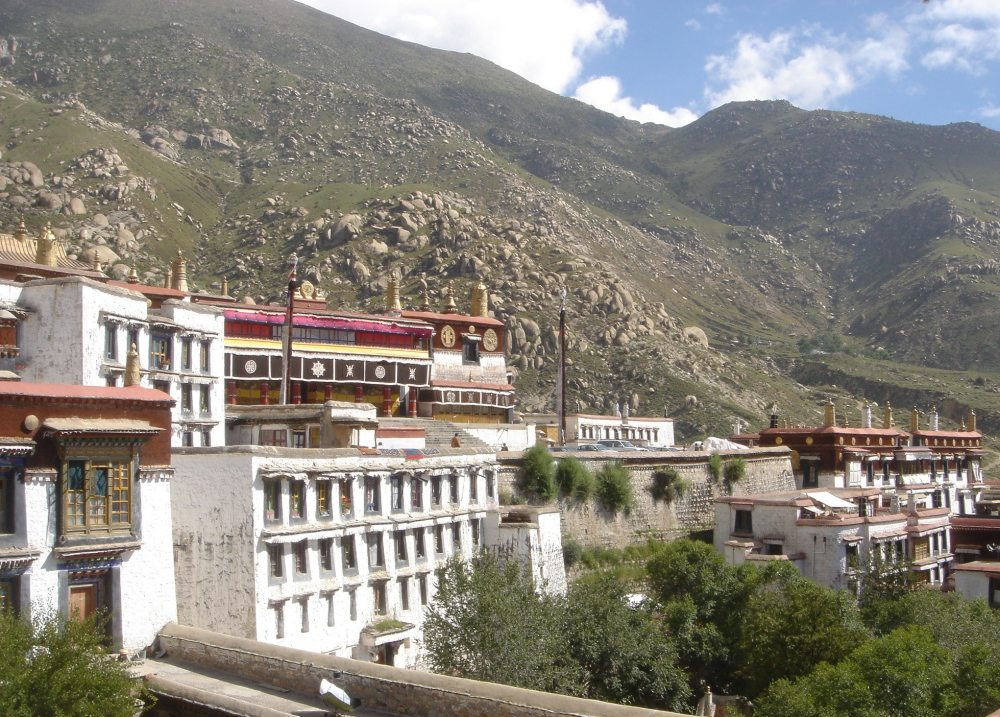
- Drepung Monastery

- Location within Tibet Autonomous Region

Religion
- Affiliation: Tibetan Buddhism
- Sect: Gelug
- Deity: Je Tsongkhapa

Location
- Location: Mount Gephel, Lhasa, Tibet Autonomous Region, China
- Country: China
- Coordinates: 29°40′35″N 91°2′51″E

Architecture
- Style: Tibetan
- Founder: Jamyang Chojey
- Established: 1416; 610 years ago

Drepung Monastery (Tibetan: འབྲས་སྤུངས་དགོན་པ, Wylie: 'bras spungs dgon pa, THL: drépung gönpa, "Rice Heap Monastery"), located at the foot of Mount Gephel, is one of the "great three" Gelug monasteries of Tibet. The other two are Ganden Monastery and Sera Monastery. Drepung is the largest of all Tibetan monasteries and is located on the Gambo Utse mountain, five kilometers from the western suburb of Lhasa.

Freddie Spencer Chapman reported, after his 1936–37 trip to Tibet, that Drepung was at that time the largest monastery in the world, and housed 7,700 monks, "but sometimes as many as 10,000 monks."

== History ==
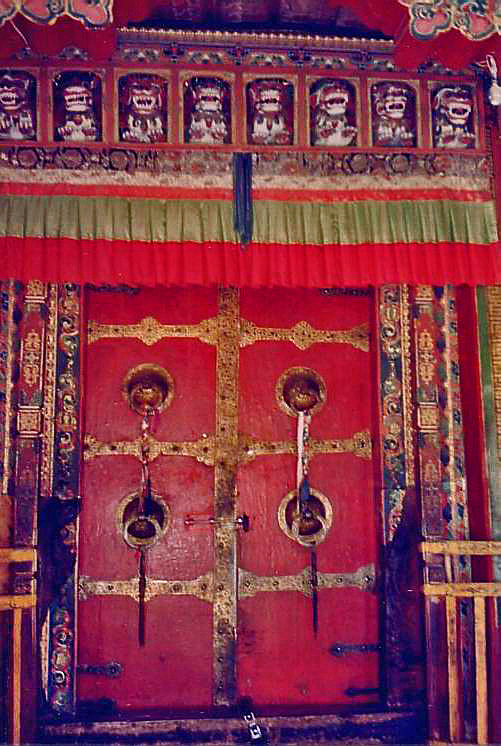
The repaired entrance to Drepung

Drepung Monastery was founded in 1416 by Jamyang Choge Tashi Palden (1397–1449), one of Tsongkhapa's main disciples, and it was named after the sacred abode in South India of Shridhanyakataka. Drepung was the principal seat of the Gelug school and it retained the premier place amongst the four great Gelug monasteries. The Ganden Phodrang (dga´ ldan pho brang) in Drepung was the residence of the Dalai Lamas until the Great Fifth Dalai Lama constructed the Potala Palace. Drepung was known for high standards of academic study, and was called the Nalanda of Tibet, a reference to the great Buddhist monastic university of India.

Old records show that there were two centres of power in Drepung: the so-called lower chamber (Zimkhang 'og ma) associated with the Dalai Lamas-to-be, and the upper chamber (Zimkhang gong ma) associated with the descendants of Sonam Drakpa, an illustrious teacher who died in 1554. The estate of the Dalai Lamas at Drepung Monastery, called Ganden Phodrang, had been constructed in 1518 by Gendun Gyatso (1476–1541), retrospectively named the 2nd Dalai Lama. The name of the Tibetan government established by the 5th Dalai Lama came from the name of this estate.

Penchen Sönam Drakpa (1478-1554 CE) succeeded Gendün Gyatso (1476–1541) in 1535 on the Throne of Drepung, both being major figures of the Gelug tradition. By the time Sönam Drakpa was appointed to the Throne of Drepung (Drepung Tri), he was already a famous Gelug master. He had already occupied the Throne of Ganden (Ganden Tri) and was considered the most prolific and important Gelug thinker of his time. He was succeeded by Sönam Gyatso (1543-1588 CE), the lama who would receive the official title of the Third Dalai Lama (Talé Lama Kutreng Sumpa).

Before his death in 1554, Sönam Drakpa established his own estate, the Upper Chamber (Zimkhang Gongma), which was named because of its location at the top of Drepung, just below the Ngakpa debating courtyard "Ngagpa Dratshang".

Tibetan Buddhist Resource Center attributes the following Name variants to Penchen Sönam Drakpa: "bsod nams grags pa [primaryName], paN chen bsod nams grags pa [title], khri 15 bsod nams grags pa [primaryTitle], rtses thang paN chen bsod nams grags pa [title], gzims khang gong ma 01 bsod nams grags pa [title], this last one referring to the Seat of the Upper Chamber established in 1554. According to TBRC his successors referring to the estate of the Zimkhang Gongma were Sonam Yeshe Wangpo (1556–92), Sonam Gelek Palzang (1594–1615) and Tulku Dragpa Gyaltsen (1619–1656) - closely connected to the famous story of Dorje Shugden. (Some say that Drakpa Gyeltsen was Sönam Drakpa's second reincarnation, but usually he is considered to be the 4th incarnation of Panchen Sonam Dragpa). It seems to be commonly accepted that Dragpa Gyaltsen was the fourth holder of the gzims khang gong ma incarnation line. According to Tibetan Buddhist Resource Center gzims khang gong ma 04 grags pa rgyal mtshan has been his "primary title". Since the search for his reincarnation has been banned, he has been the last one.

Chapman reported that in the late 1930s Drepung was divided into four colleges, each housing monks from a different locality: "one being favoured by Khampas, another by Mongolians, and so on." Each college was presided over by an abbot who had been appointed by the late 13th Dalai Lama.

Drepung is now divided into what are known as the seven great colleges: Gomang (sGo-mang), Loseling (Blo-gsal gling), Deyang (bDe-dbyangs), Shagkor (Shag-skor), Gyelwa (rGyal-ba) or Tosamling (Thos-bsam gling), Dulwa (‘Dul-ba), and Ngagpa (sNgags-pa). It can be a somewhat useful analogy to think of Drepung as a university along the lines of Oxford or the Sorbonne in the Middle Ages, the various colleges having different emphases, teaching lineages, or traditional geographical affiliations.

According to local sources, today the population at the monastery in Lhasa is about 300 monks, due to population capping enforced by the Chinese government. However, the institution has continued its tradition in exile with campuses in South India on land in Karnataka given to the Tibetan community in exile by Prime Minister Jawaharlal Nehru. The monastery in India houses over 5,000 celibate monks today, with around 3,000 at Drepung Loseling and some 2,000 at Drepung Gomang. Hundreds of new monks are admitted each year, many of them refugees from Tibet.

The Ganden-Phodrang-Palace situated at Drepung Monastery was constructed by the 2nd Dalai Lama in 1518 and declared his chief residence/governmental palace until the inauguration of Potala Palace by the 5th Dalai Lama.

== Recent events ==
Almost half of the older monastic buildings was destroyed after the Chinese arrived in Lhasa in 1951. The main buildings including the four colleges, the Tsokchen, and the Dalai Lamas' residence were preserved.

The first reported demonstration during the 2008 Tibetan uprising anniversary was on 10 March 2008, when a group of 300-400 monks from Drepung monastery marched to Lhasa's center demanding religious freedom and the release of Drepung monks arrested a year earlier. Chinese police blocked their route, and a sitting protest began. Reportedly, some monks were thrown to the ground and kicked, and up to 60 monks were arrested.

Drepung monastery was under siege four days later by Chinese forces, on 14 March 2008. Reports state forces had blocked off water, electricity, food and health facilities in Drepung Monastery and at other monasteries active in the demonstrations, including Ganden and Sera monasteries. As a consequence, monks suffered starvation.

After the 7 April 2008 foreign press tour by Chinese authorities, 80 monks had disappeared from Drepung and two from Labrang had disappeared for speaking out to reporters.

The International Herald Tribune reported that Drepung Monastery reopened in 2013 after being shut for five years.

== Gallery ==
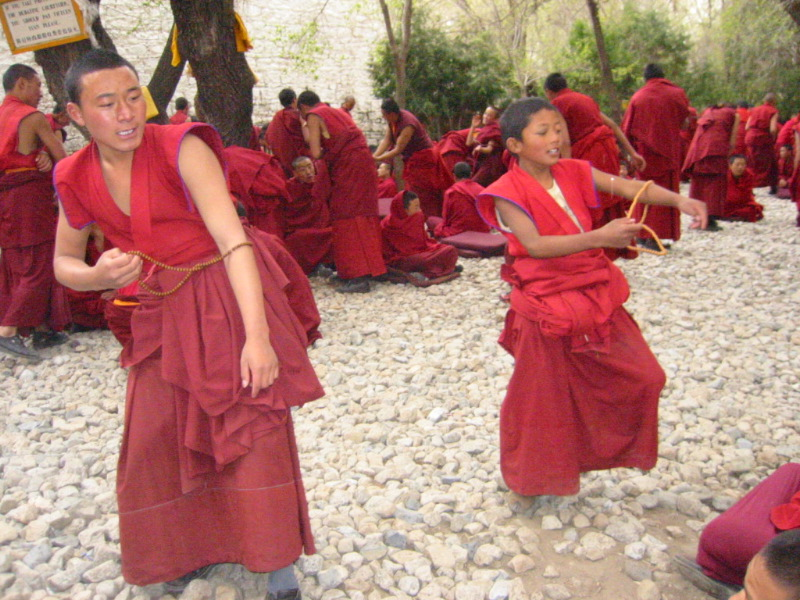
Young monks debating at Drepung

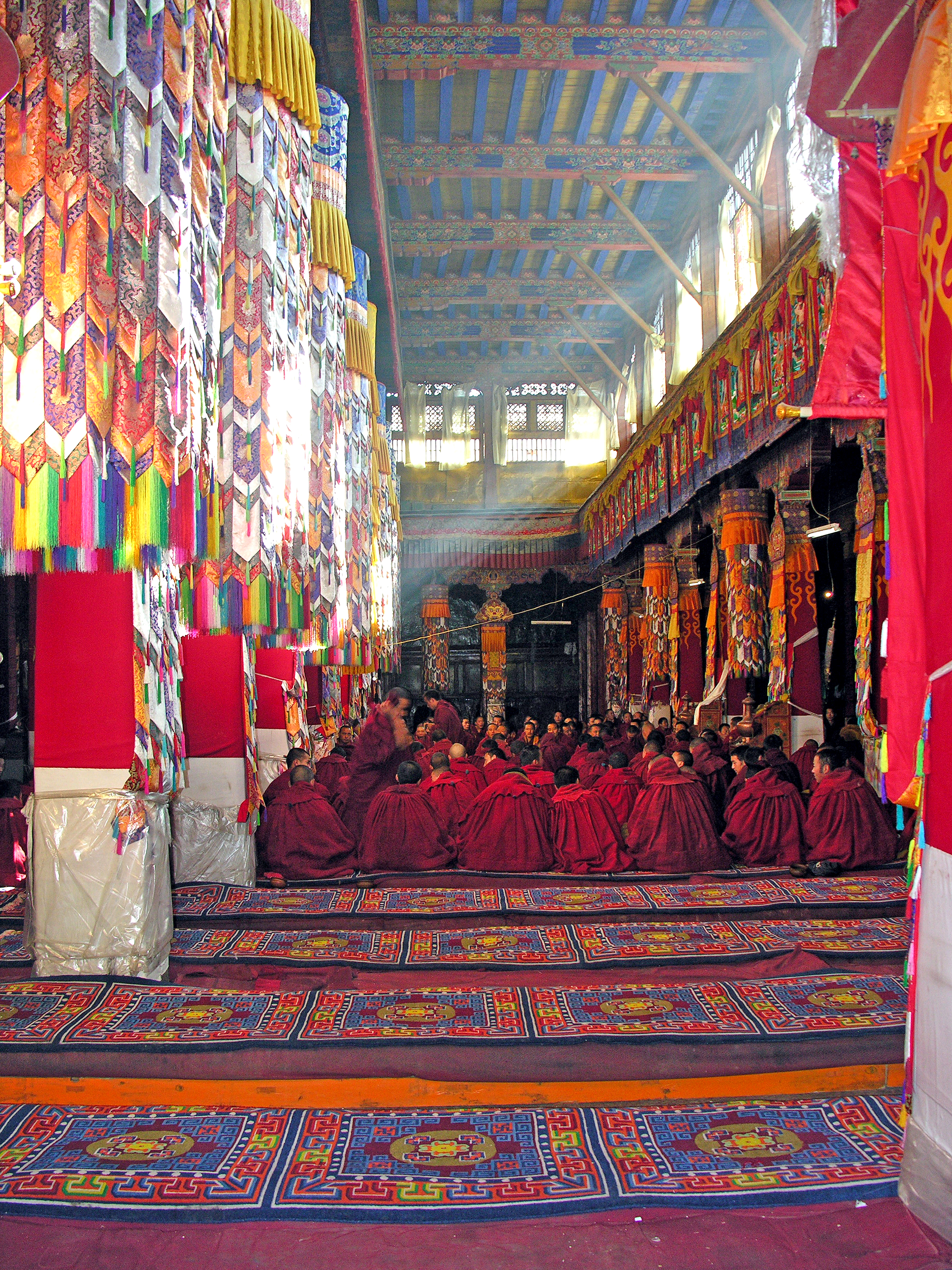
Monks in the great assembly hall, 2006

Monks chanting, 2013

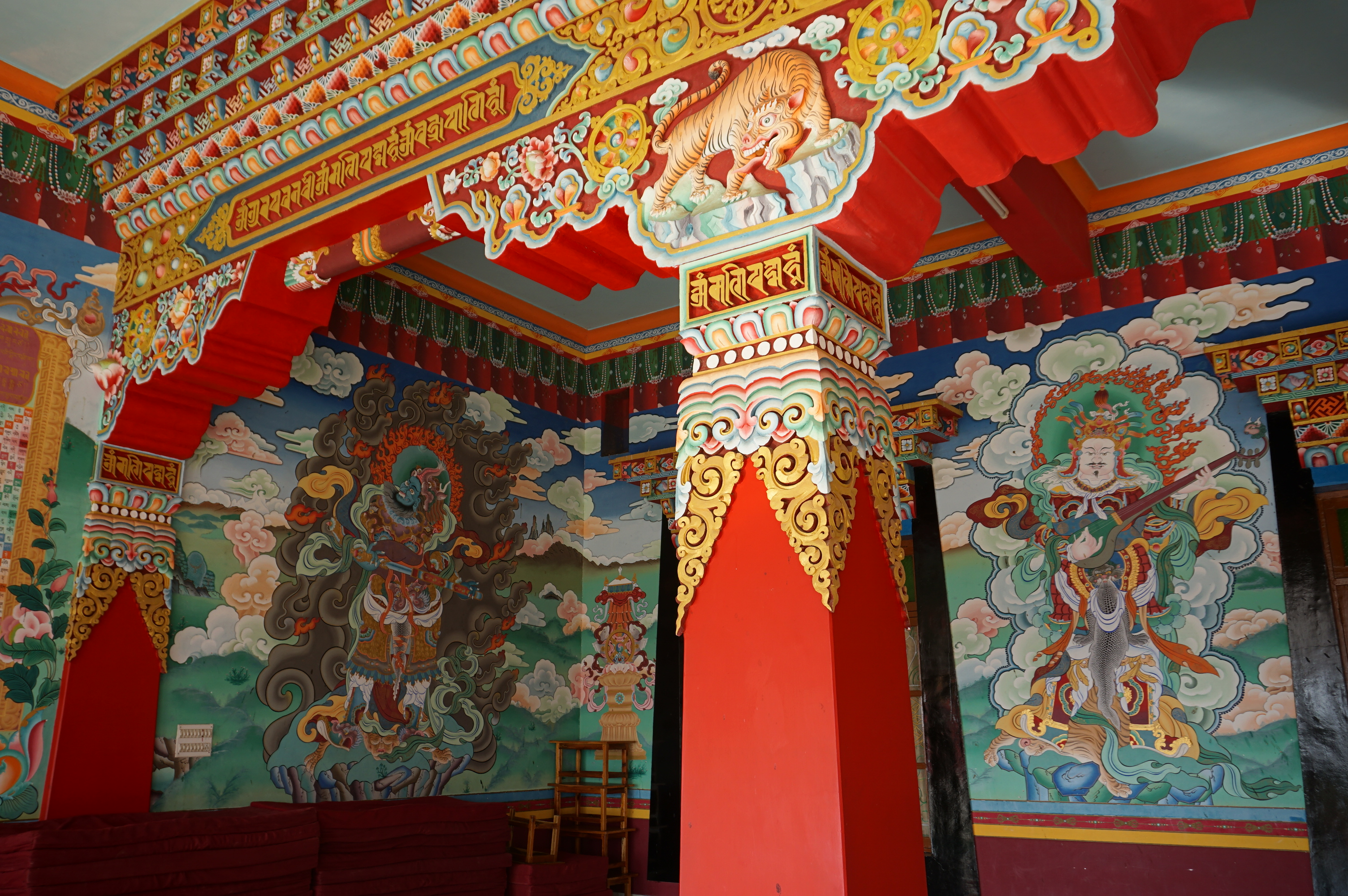
Thangkas painted on the walls of Drepung

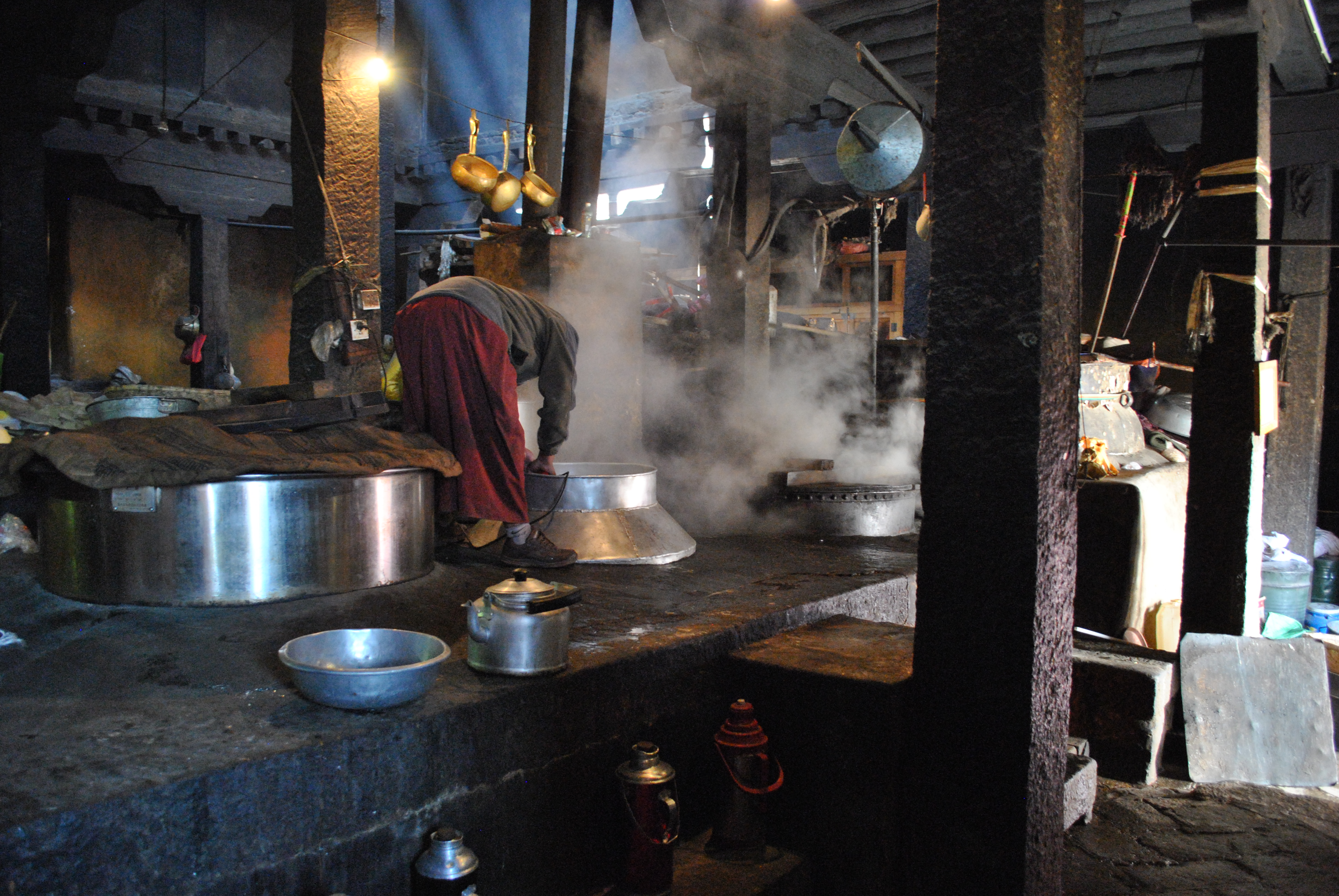
Monastery kitchen, 2013

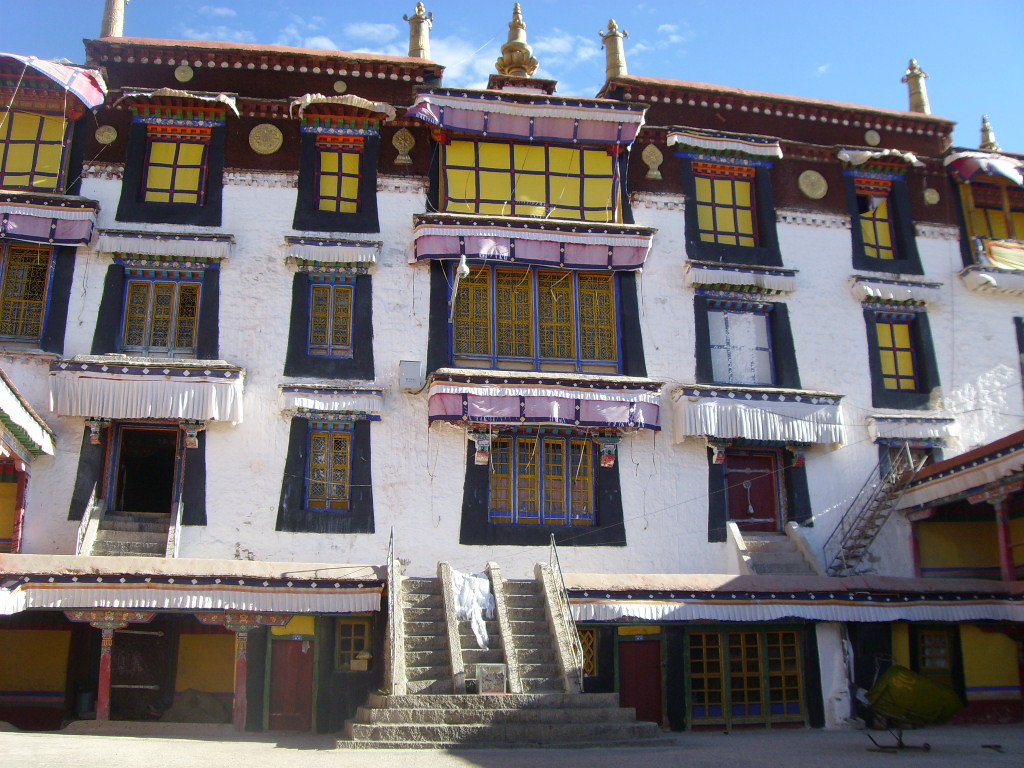
Ganden Phodrang, the Dalai Lama's residence

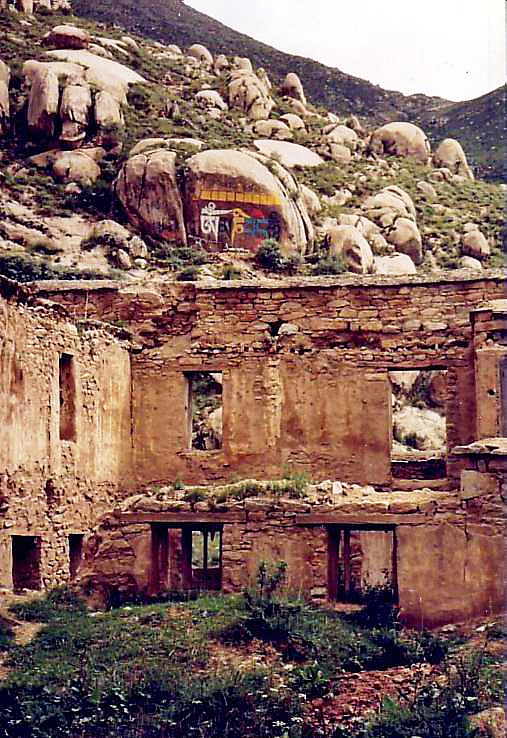
Destroyed buildings at Drepung, 1993

Drepung monastery in 1987

Entrance to the monastery

Cattle at the monastery

View from the monastery
