= Tulku Dragpa Gyaltsen =

Tibetan Gelug lama (1619–1656)

Trülku Drakpa Gyeltsen
- སྤྲུལ་སྐུ་གྲགས་པ་རྒྱལ་མཚན།

Personal life
- Died: Lhasa
- Other names: Drakpa Gyeltsen (གྲགས་པ་རྒྱལ་མཚན།), Zimkhang Gongma Drakpa Gyeltsen (གཟིམས་ཁང་གོང་མ་༤་གྲགས་པ་རྒྱལ་མཚན), Trülku Drakpa Gyeltsen (སྤྲུལ་སྐུ་གྲགས་པ་རྒྱལ་མཚན།), Kyorlung Ngari Trülku 06 (སྐྱོར་ལུང་མངའ་རིས་སྤྲུལ་སྐུ་༦).

Religious life
- Religion: Tibetan Buddhism
- Temple: Drepung Monastery
- School: Gelug

Senior posting
- Period in office: 17th century
- Reincarnation: Ngakwang Sönam Gélek Pelzang

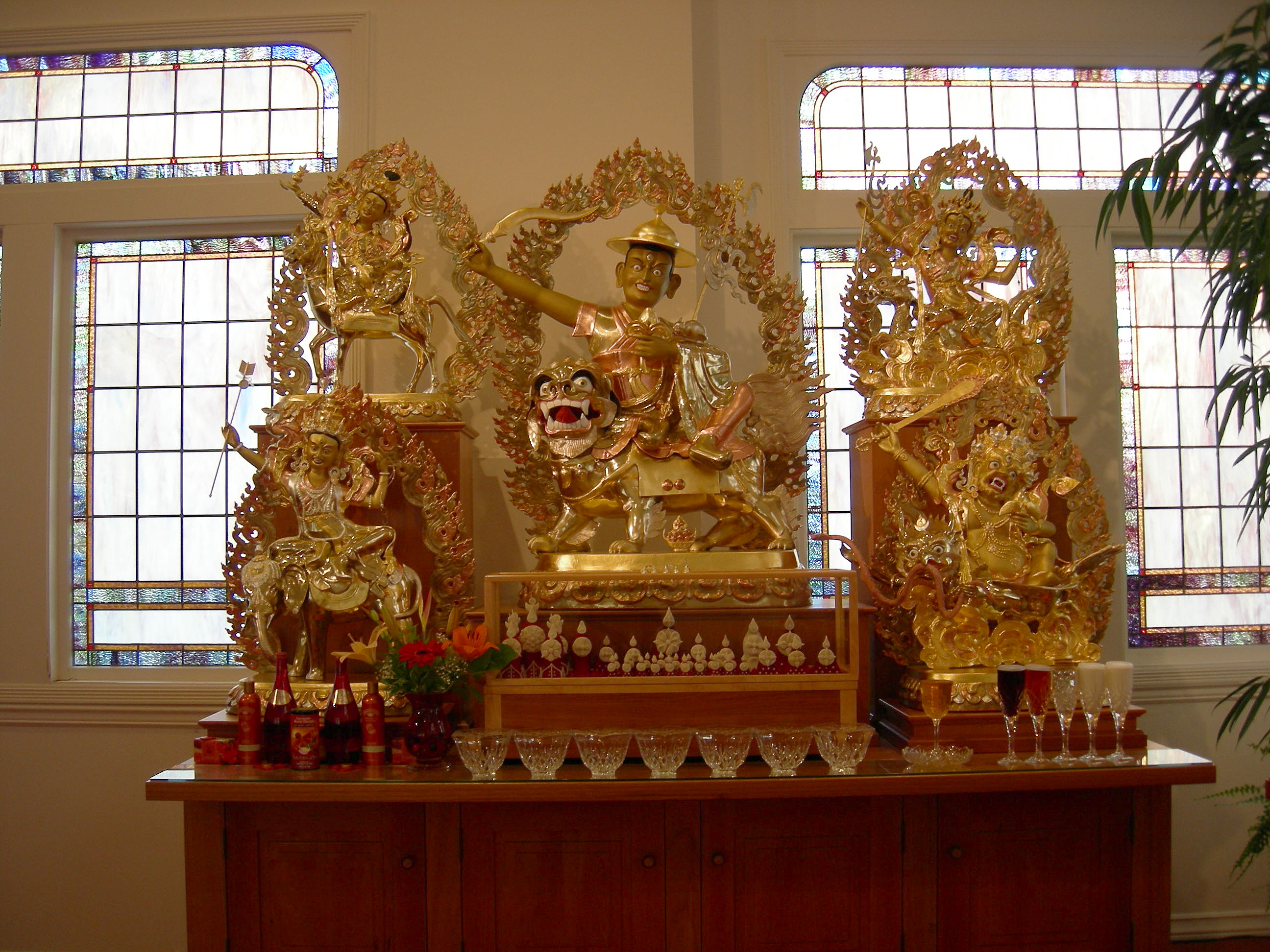

Trülku Drakpa Gyeltsen (1619–1656) was an important Gelugpa lama and a contemporary of the 5th Dalai Lama (1617–1682). His Seat was the upper residence (Wylie: gzims khang gong ma) of Drepung Monastery, a famous Gelug gompa located near Lhasa.

== Incarnation lineage ==
Tibetan Buddhists consider Trülku Drakpa Gyeltsen to be the 6th Kyorlung Ngari Tulku, a line of incarnate lamas which began with Duldzin Dragpa Gyaltsen (1374-1434), an important disciple of Je Tsongkhapa, the founder of the Gelug school.

Tulku Dragpa Gyaltsen is also called the 4th Drepung Zimkhang Gongma or rebirth of Panchen Sonam Dragpa, the 3rd Kyorlung Ngari Tulku, who held the posts of the 15th Ganden Tripa and abbot of Drepung. Before his death in 1554, he had established his own monastic estate, known as the Upper Chamber (Zimkhang Gongma), named for its location at the top of Drepung Monastery just below the Ngakpa debating courtyard. This grew to be a rival centre of power in Drepung to the estate of the Dalai Lamas, called Ganden Phodrang, or so-called lower chamber (Zimkhang 'Ogma) which had been constructed in 1518 by the 2nd Dalai Lama.

According to Lindsay G. McCune, the "Gelukpa authorities" agreed that Tulku Dragpa Gyaltsen was the immediate rebirth of Sönam Gelek Pelzang (1594–1615), and the fourth incarnation, or tulku, in the Drepung Zimkhang Gongma line.

=== Prior births ===
His prior "incarnation lineage" includes:

- Duldzin Dragpa Gyaltsen (དུལ་འཛིན་གྲགས་པ་རྒྱལ་མཚན)[1374-1434]
- Charchen Chödrak (ཆར་ཆེན་ཆོས་གྲགས་)
- Panchen Sönam Drakpa (པཎ་ཆེན་བསོད་ནམས་གྲགས་པ་) [1478—1554] (first Drepung Zimkhang Gongma)
- Sönam Yéshé Wangpo (བསོད་ནམས་ཡེ་ཤེས་དབང་པོ་)- seat: Drepung monastery
- Ngakwang Sönam Gélek Pelzang (ངག་དབང་བསོད་ནམས་དགེ་ལེགས་དཔལ་བཟང་)- seat: Drepung monastery

Some Tibetan Buddhists believe that, prior to his birth as Duldzin Dragpa Gyaltsen, he was also Buton Rinchen Drub (1291–1364) of Shalu Monastery

=== Subsequent rebirths ===
Tibetan historian Samten Karmay writes that after the death of Dragpa Gyaltsen the search for his reincarnation was banned. Thus the Drepung Zimkhang Gongma line ended and the estate founded by Panchen Sönam Dragpa in 1554 at the Upper Chamber of Drepung ceased to exist in 1656.

Some believe that Tulku Dragpa Gyaltsen then appeared as the wrathful deity Dorje Shugden. However at that time Tulku Dragpa Gyaltsen's own students and supporters disagreed with this account, stating that this spirit was not that of Drakpa Gyeltsen but rather that of the Fifth Dalai Lama's minister Desi Sönam Chöpel (sde srid bsod nams chos ’phel; 1595-1658), who was an enemy of Drakpa Gyeltsen and who had also died around the same time. Georges Dreyfus also notes that "there are other stories that seem to hint that the evil spirit connected with Drak-ba Gyel-tsen was already active prior to the latter's demise, even as early 1636. If Shuk-den was already active prior to Trul-ku Drak-ba Gyel-tsen's tragic demise, how can he be the latter's wrathful manifestation?"

The Tibetan Buddhist Resource Center database lists a continuing line of Kyorlung Ngari tulkus subsequent to Tulku Dragpa Gyaltsen:

- Ngakwang Jinpa Jamyang Tenpé Gyeltsen (ངག་དབང་སྦྱིན་པ་འཇམ་དབྱངས་བསྟན་པའི་རྒྱལ་མཚན་)
- Lozang Tashi (བློ་བཟང་བཀྲ་ཤིས་)
- Lozang Gélek Drakpa (བློ་བཟང་དགེ་ལེགས་གྲགས་པ་)
- Lozang Jikmé Tenpé Gyeltsen (བློ་བཟང་འཇིགས་མེད་བསྟན་པའི་རྒྱལ་མཚན་)
- Ngakwang Tsültrim Tenpé Gyeltsen (ངག་དབང་ཚུལ་ཁྲིམས་བསྟན་པའི་རྒྱལ་མཚན་)
- Khédrup Tendzin Chökyi Nyima (མཁས་གྲུབ་བསྟན་འཛིན་ཆོས་ཀྱི་ཉི་མ་)
- Ngakwang Lozang Khédrup Tendzin Gyatso (ངག་དབང་བློ་བཟང་མཁས་གྲུབ་བསྟན་འཛིན་རྒྱ་མཚོ་)
- Tendzin Chögyel (བསྟན་འཛིན་ཆོས་རྒྱལ་) [b.1946]

== Rivalry, murder and reincarnation ==
Tibetan historian Samten Karmay writes "It should be recalled that he had been one of the candidates for the reincarnation of the Fifth Dalai Lama. As a result, he was always seen as a rival of the Fifth Dalai Lama though he invariably proclaimed himself a disciple of the latter. He came to be despised by a number of officials and especially the sDe-srid."

Samten Karmay further writes "The circumstances of his death, whether natural or not, were contested and part of the dGe-lugs-pa school believed that the official Norbu, acting under the sDe-srid's orders had assassinated him. Whatever the truth, the search for his reincarnation was banned, which suggests that the affair must have been quite serious indeed. In 1658, the actual building of the 'Upper Chamber' was destroyed and the stupa containing the remains of the Lama was supposedly thrown into the sKyid-chu river. It was then believed that the spirit of Grags-pa rgyal-mtshan had returned as a sort of 'protector of the Buddhist religion'."

== Selected information from different sources ==
Lobsang Tamdin's be bum extracted the biographies (rnam thar) of Tulku Dragpa Gyaltsen and his reincarnation lineage into a work called sprul sku grags pa rgyal mtshan gyi sngon byung ‘khrungs rabs dang bcas pa'i rnam thar (dza ya pandi ta blo bzang 'phrin las kyi gsan yig nas zur du bkod pa bzhugs so). The originals can also be found directly in the catalog of received teachings (thob yig) of Jaya Pandita published by Lokesh Chandra, International Academy of Indian Culture (1981, vol. 4, folios 43-60). This contains the list of the long "incarnation lineage" of Tulku Dragpa Gyaltsen, with brief biographies. The biography of Tulku Dragpa Gyaltsen contains a year by year account of his life.

== Literature ==
- Autobiography of Lobsang Chökyi Gyaltsen, 4th Panchen Lama (1567–1622, Wylie: chos smra ba'i dge slong blo bzang chos kyi rgyal mtshan gyi sphyod tshul gsal bar ston pa nor bu'i phreng ba zhes bya ba zhugs so)
- The Vaidurya Serpo (Wylie: dga' ldan chos byung vai durya ser po), Desi Sangye Gyatso's (1653–1705) history of the Gandenpa tradition
- Dungkar's Encyclopedia (Wylie: dung dkar tshig mdzod chen mo) by Dungkar Lozang Trinle (1927–1997)
- Treasury of Names (Wylie: ming dzod) by Koshül Drakpa Chungne (born 20th century) and Gyelwa Lozang Khedrup (born 20th century)
- Ngawang Lozang Gyamtso's Autobiography of the 5th Dalai Lama (Wylie: za hor gyi ban de ngag dbang blo bzang rgya mtsho'i 'di snang 'khrul ba'i rol rtsed rtogs brjod kyi tshul du bkod pa du lu la' gos bzang)
- The 5th Dalai Lama's Spontaneous Achievement of the Four Enlightened Activities: [Rites of] realization, offerings, expiation, praises, feasts, and so forth for the ocean of loyal dharma protectors who possess unhindered strength and power (Wylie: thogs med drag rtsal nus stobs ldan pa'i dam can chos srung rgya mtsho'i mngon rtogs mchod 'bul bskyang bshags bstod tsogs sogs 'phrin las rnam zhi lhun drub ces bya ba bzhugs so)
- Excellent Wish-Granting Tree (Wylie: dpag bsam ljon bzang) by Sumpa Khenpo Yeshe Peljor (Wylie: sum pa ye shes dpal 'byor, 1704–1788)
