= Kokonor =

Kokonor may refer to:

- Kokonur (or Kokonor), alternative name for the Qinghai province of China
- Kokonor Lake, lake in the Kokonur province, China
- Kukkunoor, a village in East Godavari district, Andhra Pradesh, India
- Kuknur, a village in the Yelbarga taluk of the Koppal district, Karnataka, India
