= Taktse International School =

School in Sikkim, India

Coordinates: 27.3711°N 88.5889°E

- Penlong, East Sikkim, Sikkim - 737101 India

Information
- Type: Co-Educational
- Founded: 2006; 20 years ago
- Principal: Phuntsok Lauenstein
- Classes: Class 1 to 12
- Language: English
- Classrooms: 10
- Affiliation: CISCE
- Website: www.taktseschool.org

Taktse International School is a not-for-profit co-educational institution located in the foothills of the Indian Himalayas, near Gangtok, Sikkim. Established in March 2006, the school offers both residential and day boarding facilities, enrolling students from kindergarten through grade 12.

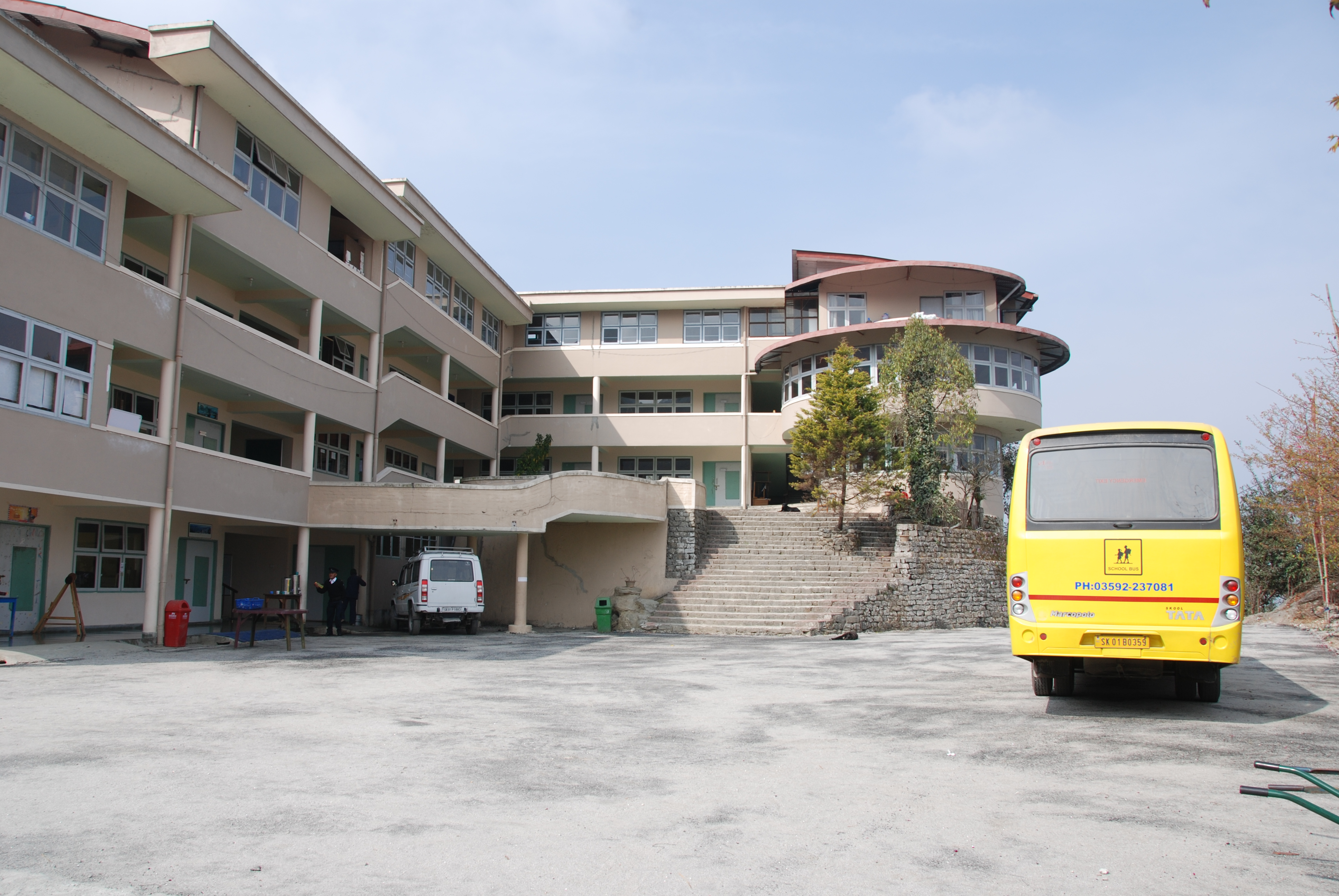
Taktse International School Main Building

== Academics ==
Taktse International School offers an interdisciplinary and value-conscious curriculum that emphasizes cultural awareness and independence. The curriculum includes the following programs:

- Write and Speak Program: This program encourages creative thinking and confidence through self-expression and public speaking.
- Math and English Activities: Students engage in interactive games related to English and Math, including Scrabble and business simulations, to enhance their skills.
- Language: The curriculum places a strong emphasis on language, ensuring that students are exposed to English and at least two other languages, Hindi and Dzongkha.

== Affiliation ==
Taktse is currently affiliated with Cambridge International Examinations, recognized by the Association of Indian Universities (AIU), including Delhi University. Additionally, the school is in the process of affiliating with the Indian Certificate of Secondary Education ( ICSE) to offer students a broader choice of educational boards.

== Location ==
Taktse International School is situated on a 35-acre campus within the verdant Maharani Estate at Pangthang. The school is connected to Gangtok by a 9 km all-weather road and is perched at an elevation of nearly 2,000 meters. The campus offers panoramic views of Kangchenjunga and much of the Himalayan mountain range. Notably, it is home to one of the highest basketball courts in the world.
