= Taktsé Castle =

Former castle in Tibet, China

Coordinates: 29.0295°N 91.6841°E

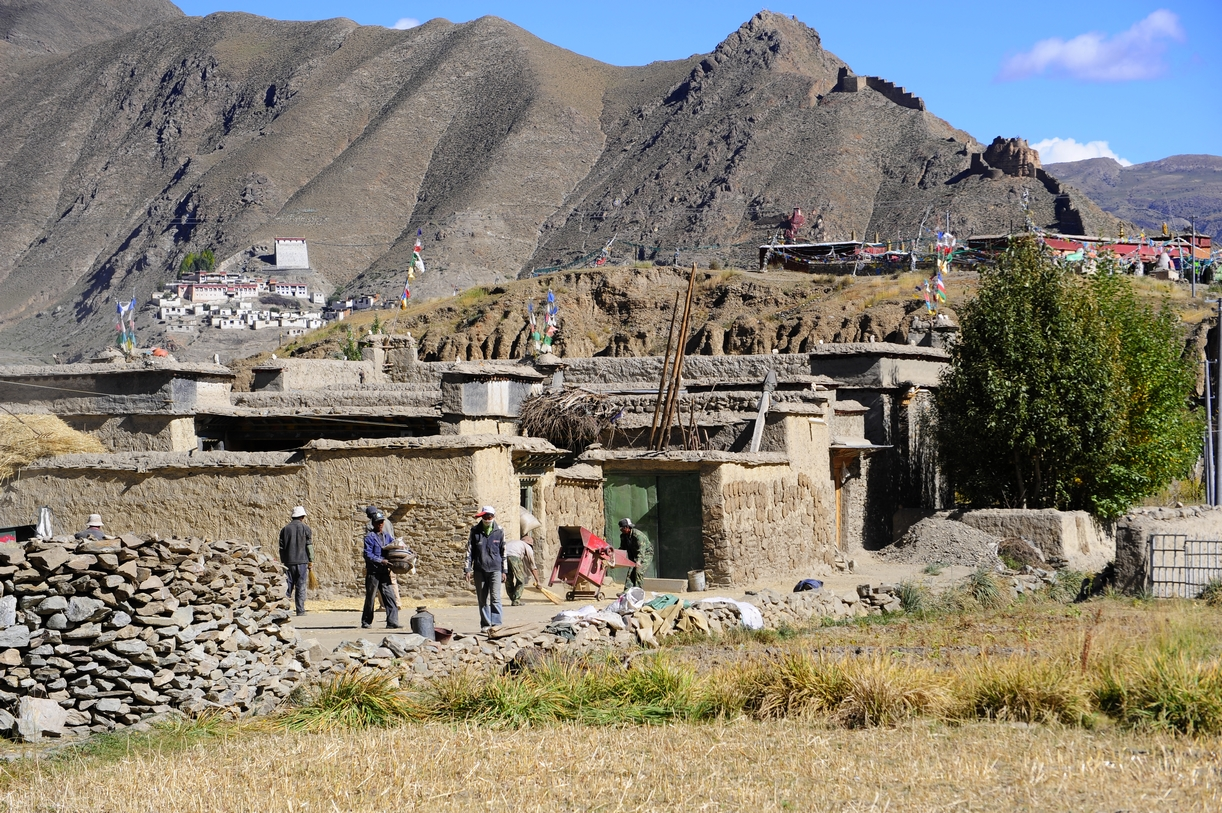
Riwo Dechen monastery, Qonggyai, near the Valley of Kings, Taktsé is on the right, up the hill.

Taktsé Castle (Tibetan: སྟག་རྩེ་, Wylie: Stag-rtse) was a castle located in the Chingwa (Wylie: Phying-ba) district of Chonggyä (Wylie: Phyongs-rgyas) in central Tibet. According to legend, it was home to the kings of Tibet before Songtsen Gampo (604–650) moved his capital to Lhasa. It later became the birthplace of the Great Fifth Dalai Lama (1617–1682), whose aristocratic family had made their home there.

Its ruins remain.

== History ==
The power that became the Tibetan state originated at the Taktsé Castle, which, according to legend, had been built by the 9th Emperor of Tibet, Chatri Tsenpo, and thus was, of old, the centre of power of the future Tibetan monarchy. According to the Old Tibetan Chronicle, in the early 7th century a group convinced Tagbu Nyazig (Stag-bu snya-gzigs) to rebel against Gudri Zingpoje (Dgu-gri Zing-po-rje), who was, in turn, a vassal of the Zhangzhung empire under the Lig Myi dynasty. The group prevailed against Zingpoje. At this point, Namri Songtsen (also known as Namri Löntsän) led his clan to, one by one, prevail over all his neighboring clans, using the easily defensible Taktse Castle effectively for military purposes. Before his assassination around 618, he gained control of all the area around what is now Lhasa, laying the stage for his son, Songsten Gampo, to craft the regional state that would later become known as the Tibetan Empire. The government of Namri Songtsen, centred at the castle, also sent two embassies to the Chinese Sui dynasty in 608 and 609, marking the appearance of Tibet on the international scene.
