= Dorje Shugden controversy =

Controversy surrounding protector spirit of Gelug Buddhism

The Dorje Shugden controversy is a controversy over Dorje Shugden, also known as Dolgyal, whom some consider to be one of several protectors of the Gelug school, the school of Tibetan Buddhism to which the Dalai Lamas belong. Dorje Shugden has become the symbolic focal point (Note: The Dorje Shugden conflict: Interview with Thierry Dodin) of a conflict over the "purity" of the Gelug school and the inclusion of non-Gelug teachings, especially Nyingma ones.

In the 1930s, Pabongkhapa Déchen Nyingpo, who favoured an "exclusive" stance, started to promote Shugden as a major protector of the Gelug school, (Note: David Kay: "A key element of Phabongkha Rinpoche’s outlook was the cult of the protective deity Dorje Shugden, which he married to the idea of Gelug exclusivism and employed against other traditions as well as against those within the Gelug who had eclectic tendencies.") (Note: Georges Dreyfus: "For Pa-bong-ka, particularly at the end of his life, one of the main functions of Gyel-chen Dor-je Shuk-den as Ge-luk protector is the use of violent means (the adamantine force) to protect the Ge-luk tradition [...] This passage clearly presents the goal of the propitiation of Shuk-den as the protection of the Ge-luk tradition through violent means, even including the killing of its enemies [...] Pa-bong-ka takes the references to eliminating the enemies of the Ge-luk tradition as more than stylistic conventions or usual ritual incantations. It may concern the elimination of actual people by the protector.") who harms any Gelug practitioner who blends his practice with non-Gelug practices. The conflict resurfaced with the publication of The Yellow Book in 1976, containing stories about Shugden's wrathful acts against Gelugpas who also practiced Nyingma teachings. In response, the 14th Dalai Lama, a Gelugpa himself and advocate of an "inclusive" approach (Rimé) to Tibetan Buddhism, began speaking out against the practice of Dorje Shugden in 1978.

The controversy attracted attention in the West following demonstrations by Dorje Shugden practitioners, especially Kelsang Gyatso's Britain-based New Kadampa Tradition, which broke away from the Gelug school in 1991. Other factions supporting Dorje Shugden are Serpom Monastic University and Shar Ganden Monastery, both of which separated from mainstream Gelug in 2008.

In April 2019, a few months before his death, Tsem Tulku Rinpoche published an article summarizing statements made in 2016 by the Dalai Lama, which Rinpoche said equate to overt permission to practice Dorje Shugden, representing a complete reversal of the Dalai Lama's former position.

== History ==
=== Pre-1930s ===
Dorje Shugden, also known as Dolgyal, originated as a gyalpo "angry and vengeful spirit" of South Tibet. Originally from the Sakya school as a minor protector that was part of the Three Gyalpo Kings (Shugden, Setrap, and Tsiu Marpo), Shugden was subsequently adopted as a "minor protector" of the Gelug, the newest of the schools of Tibetan Buddhism, headed by the Dalai Lamas (although nominally the Ganden Tripas).

=== 1930s-1940s Pabongkha ===
==== Promotion of Dorje Shugden ====
In the 1930s, Pabongkhapa Déchen Nyingpo started to promote Dorje Shugden. According to Kay, Pabongka fashioned Shugden as a violent protector of the Gelug school, who is employed against other traditions, (Note: David Kay: "A key element of Phabongkha Rinpoche’s outlook was the cult of the protective deity Dorje Shugden, which he married the idea of Gelug exclusivism and employed against other traditions as well as against those within the Gelug who had eclectic tendencies.") (Note: Georges Dreyfus: "For Pa-bong-ka, particularly at the end of his life, one of the main functions of Gyel-chen Dor-je Shuk-den as Ge-luk protector is the use of violent means (the adamantine force) to protect the Ge-luk tradition [...] This passage clearly presents the goal of the propitiation of Shuk-den as the protection of the Ge-luk tradition through violent means, even including the killing of its enemies [...] Pa-bong-ka takes the references to eliminating the enemies of the Ge-luk tradition as more than stylistic conventions or usual ritual incantations. It may concern the elimination of actual people by the protector.") transforming Dorje Shugden's "marginal practice into a central element of the Ge-luk tradition", thus "replacing the traditional supra-mundane protectors of the Ge-luk tradition", namely Mahākāla, Kalarupa, Vaiśravaṇa, Palden Lhamo, Pehar and Nechung who were appointed by Je Tsongkhapa. (Note: David Kay: "It seems that during the 1940s, supporters of Phabongkha began to proclaim the fulfilment of this tradition and to maintain that the Tibetan government should turn its allegiance away from Pehar, the state protector, to Dorje Shugden. The next stage in the status elevation process was Phabongkha’s claim that Dorje Shugden had now replaced the traditional supramundane protectors of the Gelug tradition such as Mahakala, Vaisravana and, most specifically, Kalarupa (‘the Dharma-King’), the main protector of the Gelug who, it is believed, was bound to an oath by Tsong Khapa himself."") (Note: George Dreyfus: "These descriptions have been controversial. Traditionally, the Ge-luk tradition has been protected by the Dharma-king (dam can chos rgyal), the supra-mundane deity bound to an oath given to Dzong-ka-ba, the founder of the tradition. The tradition also speaks of three main protectors adapted to the three scopes of practice described in the Stages of the Path (skyes bu gsum gyi srung ma): Mahakala for the person of great scope, Vaibravala for the person of middling scope, and the Dharma-king for the person of small scope. By describing Shuk-den as "the protector of the tradition of the victorious lord Manjushri", Pa-bong-ka suggests that he is the protector of the Ge-luk tradition, replacing the protectors appointed by Dzong-ka-ba himself. This impression is confirmed by one of the stories that Shuk-den's partisans use to justify their claim. According to this story, the Dharma-king has left this world to retire in the pure land of Tushita having entrusted the protection of the Ge-luk tradition to Shuk-den. Thus, Shuk-den has become the main Ge-luk protector replacing the traditional supra-mundane protectors of the Ge-luk tradition, indeed a spectacular promotion in the pantheon of the tradition)

According to Georges Dreyfus, "Shuk-den was nothing but a minor Ge-luk protector before the 1930s when Pa-bong-ka started to promote him aggressively as the main Ge-luk protector." Dreyfus also notes,

[T]he propitiation of Shukden as a Geluk protector is not an ancestral tradition, but a relatively recent invention of tradition associated with the revival movement within the Geluk spearheaded by Pabongkha. (Note: Are We Prisoners of Shangrila? Orientalism, Nationalism, and the Study of Tibet by Georges Dreyfus, JIATS, no. 1 (October 2005), THL #T1218, 21, section 3: The Shukden Affair and Buddhist Modernism, retrieved 2009-10-04.)

This change is reflected in artwork, since there is "lack of Dorje Shugden art in the Gelug school prior to the end of the 19th century."

==== Persecution of the Rimé movement ====
Dorje Shugden was a key tool in Pabongkhapa's persecution of the flourishing Rimé movement, an ecumenical movement which fused the teachings of the Sakya, Kagyu and Nyingma, in response to the dominance of the Gelug school. Non-Gelug, especially Nyingma, monasteries were forced to convert to the Gelug position.

As the Gelug agent of the Tibetan government in Kham (Khams) (Eastern Tibet), and in response to the Rimed movement that had originated and was flowering in that region, Phabongkha Rinpoche and his disciples employed repressive measures against non-Gelug sects. Religious artefacts associated with Padmasambhava – who is revered as a "second Buddha" by Nyingma practitioners – were destroyed, and non-Gelug, and particularly Nyingma, monasteries were forcibly converted to the Gelug position. A key element of Phabongkha Rinpoche’s outlook was the cult of the protective deity Dorje Shugden, which he married to the idea of Gelug exclusivism and employed against other traditions as well as against those within the Gelug who had eclectic tendencies.

Pabongkhapa feared a decline of Gelug monasteries, and induced a revival movement, which promoted the Gelug as the only pure tradition. He regarded the practice of non-Gelug teachings by Gelug monks as a threat to the Gelug tradition, and opposed the influence of the other schools, especially the Nyingma. He coupled Dorje Shugden to Gelug exclusivism, using it against other traditions, and against Gelugpa's with eclectic tendencies. The main function of the deity was presented as "the protection of the Ge-luk tradition through violent means, even including the killing of its enemies."

==== Response by the 13th Dalai Lama ====
The abbot of Drepung Monastery and the 13th Dalai Lama were opposed to Pabongkapa's propitiation of Shugden. (Note: Raimondo Bultrini: "But not everyone agreed with the decision to hold that ritual in the monastery dedicated to the guardian deity of the Dalai Lamas and the Tibetan government. Among these was the Abbot of Drepung Monastery, who immediately consulted Nechung, the State Oracle. The Oracle’s silence was more explicit than a thousand words. There could not be two protectors under the same roof, wrote the abbot to His Holiness, the Thirteenth Dalai Lama. A month had gone by since Phabongka Rinpoche had conferred the initiation at Drepung. From that day the practice of the gyalpo spread like oil on water among the young students in the colleges. The Dalai Lama, aware of the risk of open conflict, decided to have Phabongka formally rebuked by a government functionary. Then he wrote to him personally, revealing how disconcerted he was by his behavior. A few days went by, and a messenger brought Phabongka’s response to the Potala, with a gold coin and a white kata. Phabongka apologized, saying it was his fault alone and that he had nothing to add in his defense: "What I have done is unjustifiable and in the future, as you have asked of me, I shall take your instructions to heart. I ask your forgiveness for what I have done and written." The Dalai Lama responded to Phabongka’s apology with a second letter, which did not entirely mask his displeasure: "There is much to be said about your words and deeds, in both in logistical and doctrinal terms, but I do not want to continue on this subject. Concerning your references to the practice of the refuge, first of all you are propitiating Shugden as a protector. And since these students now have a connection with you, the practice has notably spread at Drepung. Since the monastery was first founded by Jamyang Choejey, Nechung has been designated as guardian and protector of Drepung, and his oracle has expressed his great dissatisfaction to the abbot on several occasions, saying that appeasing Shugden has accelerated the degeneration of the Buddha’s teaching. This is the root of the problem. In particular, your search for the support of a worldly guardian to ensure benefits in this life is contrary to the principle of the taking of refuge. Therefore, it is contradictory to affirm, as you do "from the bottom of your heart", that what happened is only the fruit of your "confusion and ignorance", and that you were not aware of having "followed a wrongful path and led others onto it." Phabongka replied with apparent humility: "You have asked me why I am interested in this protector. I must explain that, according to my old mother, Shugden was a guardian for my family from the start, and that is why I have honored him. But now I want to say that I have repented and I have understood my mistake. I shall perform purification and promise with all my heart that in the future I will avoid propitiating, praying to, and making daily offerings [to Shugden]. I admit to all the errors I have made, disturbing Nechung and contradicting the principle of the refuge, and I beg you, in your great heartfelt compassion, to forgive me and purify my actions.") Restrictions on the practice of Shugden were implemented by the 13th Dalai Lama. Pabongkhapa apologized and promised not to engage in Shugden practices any more. (Note: Raimondo Bultrini: Phabongka said "I shall perform purification and promise with all my heart that in the future I will avoid propitiating, praying to, and making daily offerings to Shugden. I admit to all the errors I have made, disturbing Nechung and contradicting the principle of the refuge, and I beg you, in your great heartfelt compassion, to forgive me and purify my actions.")

=== 1970s ===
==== Publication of The Yellow Book ====
In 1975, The Yellow Book, also known as The Oral Transmission of the Intelligent Father, was published by Zimey Rinpoche. It enumerates a series of stories that Zimey Rinpoche had heard informally from Trijang Rinpoche about ‘the many Ge-luk lamas whose lives are supposed to have been shortened by Shuk-den’s displeasure at their practicing Nying-ma teachings’. The text asserts the pre-eminence of the Gelug school which is symbolised and safeguarded by Dorje Shugden, and presents a stern warning to those within the Gelug whose eclectic tendencies would compromise the school's purity. The book provoked angry reactions from non-Gelug traditions, triggering a bitter literary exchange that drew on ‘all aspects of sectarian rivalry’.

==== Response by the 14th Dalai Lama ====
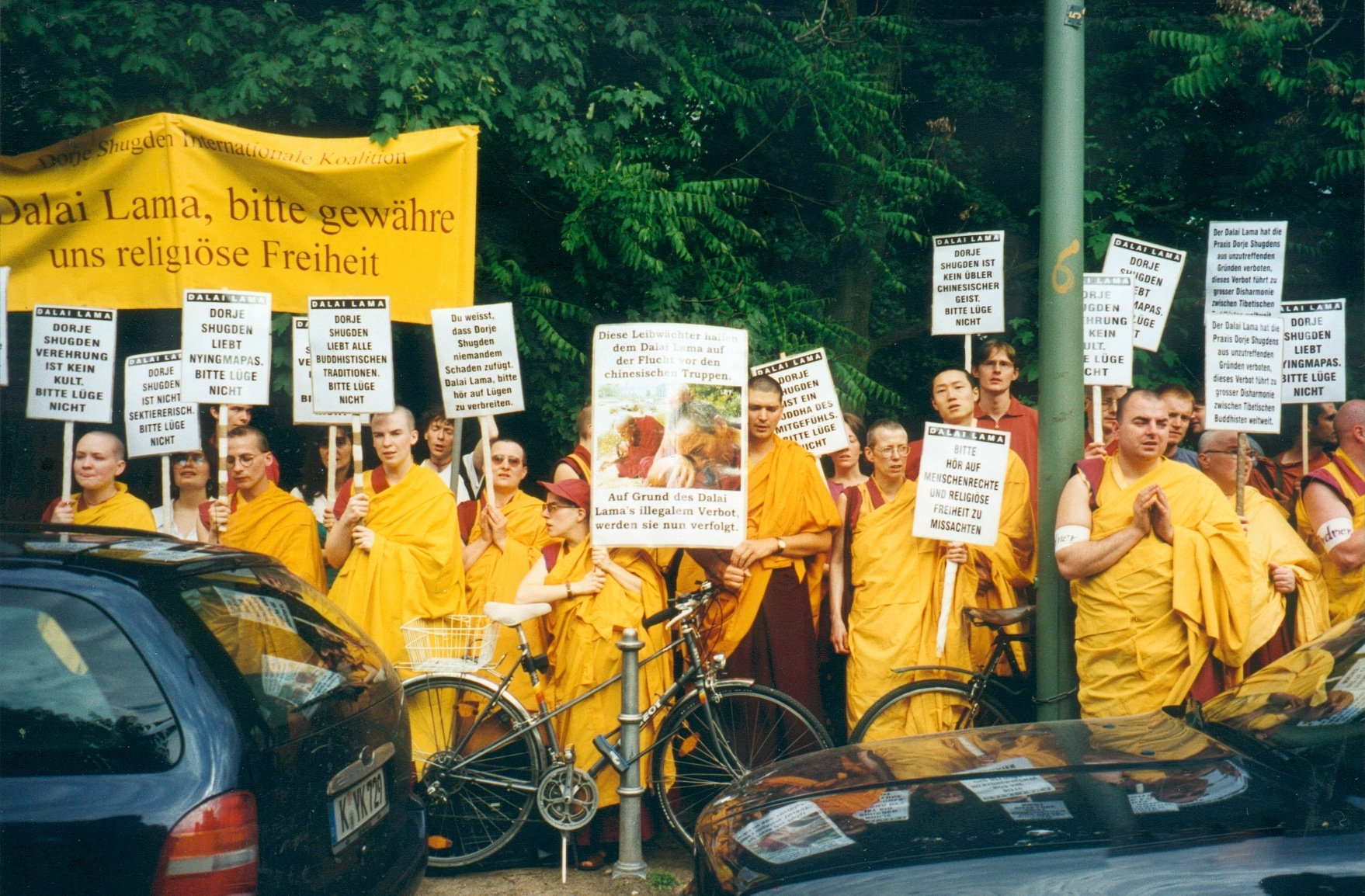
1998 Berlin New Kadampa Tradition demonstration protest against the 14th Dalai Lama. Some German slogans translated are "You know that Dorje Shugden harms no being, please Dalai Lama stop spreading lies!" and "Dorje Shugden loves all Buddhist traditions, please don't lie!"

The 14th Dalai Lama publicly rejected The Yellow Book, claiming that it could only damage the common cause of the Tibetan people because of its sectarian divisiveness. In a series of talks, he sought to undermine the status elevation of Dorje Shugden by reaffirming the centrality of traditional supramundane protectors of the Gelug tradition. He also vehemently rejected Dorje Shugden's associated sectarianism, emphasising that all the Tibetan traditions are ‘equally profound dharmas’ and defending the ‘unbiased and eclectic’ approach to Buddhist practice as exemplified by the Second, Third and Fifth Dalai Lamas.

Scholar Donald S. Lopez Jr. explains, "The Dalai Lama’s renunciation of Shugden in 1976 caused great discord within the Geluk community, where devotion to the deity remained strong among the Geluk hierarchy and among large factions of the refugee lay community; spirited defenses of his worship were written and published. Some went so far as to claim that the Dalai Lama was not the true Dalai Lama, that the search party had selected the wrong child forty years before."

According to Georges Dreyfus, the sectarian elements of The Yellow Book were not unusual and do not "justify or explain the Dalai Lama's strong reaction." Instead, he traces back the conflict more on the exclusive/inclusive approach and maintain that to understand the Dalai Lama's point of view one has to consider the complex ritual basis for the institution of the Dalai Lamas, which was developed by the Great Fifth and rests upon "an eclectic religious basis in which elements associated with the Nyingma tradition combine with an overall Gelug orientation." This involves the promotion and practices of the Nyingma school. Kay reminds us, "[W]hen traditions come into conflict, religious and philosophical differences are often markers of disputes that are primarily economic, material and political in nature."

=== 1980s ===
Bluck notes the activity regarding Dorje Shugden practice in the 80s: "In the early 1980s the Dalai Lama restricted reliance on Dorje Shugden to private rather than public practice. The tension this caused within the Gelug and wider Tibetan community may reflect some opposition to his ecumenical approach."

=== 1990s ===
==== Initiations by the 14th Dalai Lama ====
With the urging of the other schools who have long been opposed to Shugden, (Note: Raimondo bultrini: HHDL states "The previous Dudjom Rinpoche, one of the great Nyingmapa masters, once told me that Shugden was negative for the Tibetan government.") and his senior Gelug tutor who always doubted the practice, (Note: David Kay: "Ling Rinpoche, who was from Drepung monastery, was not a devotee of Dorje Shugden, and at the time of the dispute he naturally sided with the Dalai Lama.") (Note: Raimondo Bultrini: HHDL states "That same day, when I told my senior tutor Ling Rinpoche, he confessed he was very happy, since he always had harbored doubts regarding the practice. He told me it certainly was the right decision...Ling Rinpoche raised a doubt with Phabongka that was shared by many others. "If we at Drepung start to worship Shugden, isn’t there a risk of a conflict between the two that could bring us harm? Nechung will not be happy", he said.") the 14th Dalai Lama asked the increasing number of western Shugden practitioners who were newly being proselytized primarily in Britain to refrain from attending his teachings. (Note: Robert Thurman: "In the late 80s', when certain individual lamas began to proselytize its cult, inducting even Western practitioners new to Buddhism, especially in England, he took the step of asking such persons to refrain from attending his initiations and associated advanced teachings, on the grounds that they were not following his advice and so should not take him as their teacher.") George Chryssides, quoting Stephen Batchelor, states:

Affairs came to a head in March 1996, when the Dalai Lama formally pronounced his opposition to Dorje Shugden, saying "It has become fairly clear that Dolgyal (i.e. Shugden) is a spirit of the dark forces." (Batchelor, 1998, p. 64) The Tibetan government in exile is said to have conducted house searches, demanding that people sign a declaration stating that they have abandoned Dorje Shugden practice (Batchelor, 1998, p. 64).

==== New Kadampa Tradition ====
The New Kadampa Tradition, founded by Kelsang Gyatso in 1991, has continued the worship of Dorje Shugden. Kelsang Gyatso regards his school to be the true continuation of the "pure" teachings of Je Tsongkhapa, rejecting the "inclusivism" of the Dalai Lama. Thurman notes that members of the New Kadampa Tradition, responded by trying

...to force their supposed mentor to adopt their perspective that the demonic spirit is an enlightened being, almost more important than the Buddha himself, and perhaps also rejoin their worship of it, or at least give them all his initiatory teachings in spite of their defiance of his best advice.

Martin Mills states that:

recent dispute within the Gelukpa Order over the status of the Dharma Protector Dorje Shugden have focused on claims by a breakaway order of the Gelukpa, the British-based New Kadampa Tradition, that Shugden is of Buddha status (most Gelukpa commentators place him as a worldly deity)

==== DSRCS and SSC/WSS ====
In India, some protests and opposition were organised by the Dorje Shugden Religious and Charitable Society (DSRCS) with the support of the Shugden Supporters Community (SSC), (Note: Allegations of Religious Persecution by Dorje Shugden Devotees Charitable and Religious Society and Shugden Supporters Community (Delhi), 1996-06-19, retrieved 2008-12-04) now called Western Shugden Society. (Note: Tibetan Buddhism in the West, A Little Knowledge Is A Dangerous Thing)

In 1996, the SSC attempted to obtain a statement from Amnesty International (AI) that the TGIE (specifically the 14th Dalai Lama) had violated human rights. However, the AI replied that the SSC's allegations were as yet unsubstantiated. Two years later, the AI stated in an official press release that complaints by Shugden practitioners fell outside its purview of "grave violations of fundamental human rights" (such as torture, the death penalty, extrajudicial executions, arbitrary detention or imprisonment, or unfair trials), adding that "while recognizing that a spiritual debate can be contentious, [we] cannot become involved in debate on spiritual issues." (Note: Amnesty International's position on alleged abuses against worshippers of Tibetan deity Dorje Shugden, AI Index 17/14/98, 1998-06, quoted in The Dalai Lama's Buddhist Foes by David Van Biema (2008-07-18), retrieved 2009-10-31.) In itself, the nuanced statement neither asserted nor denied the validity of the claims made against the TGIE, just that they were not actionable according to AI's mandate. (Note: When Machiavelli dons Tibetan robes) (Note: Chandler, Jeannie M. Hunting the Guru: Lineage, Culture, and Conflict in the Development of Tibetan Buddhism in America (2009), p. 211)

The DSRCS and Kundeling Lama filed a petition against the Central Tibetan Administration (CTA) and the Dalai Lama, accusing them of harassment and maltreatment. On 5 April 2010, Justice S. Muralidhar dismissed the petition, stating that allegations of violence and harassment were "vague averments" and that there as an "absence of any specific instances of any such attacks." (Note: Delhi High Court Dismisses Dorjee Shugden Devotees’ Charges 2010-04-10, retrieved 2010-04-29.)

==== Murder of Lobsang Gyatso and two students ====
On February 4, 1997, the principal of the Buddhist School of Dialectics, Lobsang Gyatso, was murdered along with two of his students in Dharamshala. Kay notes "The subsequent investigation by the Indian police linked the murders to the Dorje Shugden faction of the exiled Tibetan community."

In a small 1978 pamphlet, Lobsang Gyatso alluded to a "knotless heretic teacher", which some people took as referring to Trijang Lobsang Yeshe Tenzin Gyatso and his advocacy of Shugden. According to Lobsang Gyatso's biographer, Gareth Sparham, many geshes and lamas were outraged over his criticism:

How could a nobody like Lobsang Gyatso, who was neither from an aristocratic family nor the head of a Tibetan region, indeed not even a full graduate of a religious university, dare to criticize in print an important establishment figure? Georges Dreyfus at the time remarked that in pre-1959 Gen-la would have been killed outright for his temerity. Many in the Tibetan community ostracized Gen-la, even though the Dalai Lama had already by that time begun speaking publicly against the Shugden cult. Even the Dalai Lama appeared to distance himself from Gen-la. "He is headstrong and his lack of sensitivity is making trouble", seemed to be his attitude towards Gen-la at the time.

Georges Dreyfus added, "Despite being hurt by the polemical attack, Tri-jang Rin-po-che made it clear that violence was out of the question. Gradually, tempers cooled down and the incident was forgotten—or so it seemed."

In June 2007, the Times stated that Interpol had issued a Red notice to China for extraditing two of the alleged killers, Lobsang Chodak and Tenzin Chozin. Robert Thurman adds that the alleged killers had their origin within China as well. The Seattle Times reported, "The two men suspected of stabbing their victims are believed to have fled India. Five others, all linked to the Dorje Shugden Society in New Delhi, were questioned for months about a possible conspiracy. No one has been charged."

Kelsang Gyatso denied the involvement of any of his followers in the murder, and condemned the killings. (Note: Clifton, Tony. Did an obscure Tibetan sect murder three monks close to the Dalai Lama?. Newsweek. 1997-04-28. Retrieved 2009-04-10.) Matthews notes that "In spite of speculation, no connection has been found between New Kadampa Tradition and the murders in Dharamsala"

=== 2000s-present ===
==== Attempted murder ====
Trijang Chocktrul Rinpoche revealed an attempt to frame the Central Tibetan Administration with murder:

In my own labrang, I have recently witnessed a kind of factionalism, and I have discovered that one person in particular was planning an evil conspiracy. This plan was to murder my assistant, Tharchin, and to implicate His Holiness’s government-in-exile with this odious crime [...] If he had succeeded in his plan, it would have been a cause of great trouble for the labrang, as well as a cause of disgrace to the Tibetan government and His Holiness the Dalai Lama.

Trijang Chocktrul Rinpoche's declaration disturbed the image of a peaceful community, and the polemics against the Dalai Lama diminished for a long while.

==== Schism within the Gelug school ====
The Gelugpa school has three great monasteries, namely Sera, Ganden, and Drepung. In 2008, the Dorje Shugden controversy led to formal schism within the Gelug school. Pomra Khangtsen, one of the sixteen sections of Sera monastery, legally separated itself in India from the rest of Sera, continuing as "Serpom Monastic University" at Bylakuppe. Also in 2008, a section of Ganden Shartse at Mundgod similarly separated itself from Ganden and is now known as "Shar Ganden Monastery". In these institutions, the monks continue to worship Dorje Shugden as well as follow traditional curricula and other religious practices of their parent institutions. A few smaller Gelug monasteries have affiliated themselves with these two monasteries rather than with mainstream Gelug.

The present abbot of Serpom is Kyabje Yongyal and its acting abbot is Jampa Khetsun. The present abbot of Shar Ganden is Lobsang Jinpa.

==== Protests ====
Hundreds of western Shugden practitioners have staged numerous demonstrations against the Dalai Lama, most recently in 2015 when he opened the Aldershot Buddhist Centre (Note: Dalai Lama 'behind Lhasa unrest', 10 May 2006.) and in Cambridge, and 2014 in San Francisco, Berkeley, Washington, D.C., Oslo, Rotterdam, and Frankfurt.

In response, the Central Tibetan Administration (CTA) published different statements and corrections to the protesters' claims. They also posted two lists of Tibetan participants of the protests and a declaration by former NKT members and ex-practitioners of Dorje Shugden. International Campaign for Tibet also condemned the protests, stating in February 2015, "The way the group has been denigrating the Dalai Lama is an affront to the Tibetan people and is causing great damage to the broader Tibetan issue."

== Views ==
=== Views of opponents of Dorje Shugden practice ===
==== Ling Rinpoche ====
Ling Rinpoche, who was the Ganden Tripa and senior Gelug tutor to the 14th Dalai Lama, was opposed to Shugden as he hailed from Drepung Monastery.

==== Views of the 14th Dalai Lama ====
The 14th Dalai Lama himself said in 2008, that he never used the word "ban", but "he strongly discourages Tibetan Buddhists" (Note: His Holiness the Dalai Lama's Advice Concerning Dolgyal (Shugden)) in practicing Shugden and "restricting a form of practice that restricts others’ religious freedom is actually a protection of religious freedom. So in other words, negation of a negation is an affirmation". (Note: The Dalai Lama on Sectarianism, Religious Freedom and the Shugden Issue, Madison, Wisconsin, July, 2008, retrieved 03/11/2014.) The advice of the 14th Dalai Lama was approved by the Central Tibetan Administration (Note: Kashag's Statement Concerning Dolgyal) and the Parliament in exile (Note: The Assembly of Tibetan People's Deputies' Resolutions) in 1996. It was then gradually implemented into a ban starting from 1997 by the Tibetan Youth Congress including enforcement measures like imposing all spiritual masters to stop propitiating Shugden "in the interest of the Dalai Lama and Tibetan Independence" or urging all other Tibetan organizations and communities to expel anyone who venerates Shugden. (Note: Resolution Passed by the Tibetan Youth Congress (1997))

Several reasons for the 14th Dalai Lama's stance have been given. According to John Makransky,

The current Dalai Lama, seeking to combat the ancient, virulent sectarianisms operative in such quarters, has strongly discouraged the worship of the "protector" deity known as Dorje Shugden, because one of its functions has been to force conformity to the dGe-lugs-pa sect (with which the Dalai Lama himself is most closely associated) and to assert power over competing sects.

According to Kapstein, the 14th Dalai Lama is "focused upon the role of Shugden as a militantly sectarian protector of the Gelukpa order, and the harm that has been done to Tibetan sectarian relations by the cult's more vociferous proponents."

According to Dreyfus, the 14th Dalai Lama stance stems from his favoring the traditional Gelug traditions and protectors rather than Shugden:

[I]n this dispute the Dalai Lama’s position does not stem from his Buddhist modernism and from a desire to develop a modern nationalism, but from his commitment to another protector, Nechung, who is said to resent Shukden [...] his opposition to Shukden is motivated by his return to a more traditional stance in which this deity is seen as incompatible with the vision of the tradition (the "clan") represented by the Fifth Dalai Lama.

=== Views of Shugden practitioners ===
==== Kelsang Gyatso ====
In an interview with scholar Donald Lopez on the controversy, Kelsang Gyatso explains:

We believe that Dorje Shugden is a buddha who is also a dharmapala. Problems have arisen because of someone’s view. So although we say the "Dorje Shugden problem" in reality this is a human problem, not a Dorje Shugden problem. This is not a fault of Buddha-dharma, not a fault of Tibetan Buddhism, or even a fault of Tibetan people in general. This is a particular person’s wrong view. He can keep this view, of course, but forcing other people to follow this is not right. For this reason, nowadays we [Tibetan Buddhists] are showing many problems to the world. We are ashamed and sorry that this causes the reputation of Buddhists in general to be damaged. It is not a general Buddhist problem, but a specific problem within Tibetan Buddhism.

In the interview, Kelsang Gyatso states:

Of course we believe that every Nyingmapa and Kagyupa have their complete path. Not only Gelugpa. I believe that Nyingmapas have a complete path. Of course, Kagyupas are very special. We very much appreciate the example of Marpa and Milarepa [in the Kagyu lineage]. Milarepa showed the best example of guru devotion. Of course the Kagyupas as well as the Nyingmapas and the Sakyapas, have a complete path to enlightenment.

According to Kelsang Gyatso,

Dorje Shugden always helps, guides, and protects pure and faithful practitioners by granting blessings, increasing their wisdom, fulfilling their wishes, and bestowing success on all their virtuous activities. Dorje Shugden does not help only Gelugpas; because he is a Buddha he helps all living beings, including non-Buddhists.

According to David Kay, Kelsang Gyatso departs from Pabongkhapa and Trijang Rinpoche by stating that Dorje Shugden's appearance is enlightened, rather than worldly. According to Kay, "Geshe Kelsang takes the elevation of Dorje Shugden’s ontological status another step further, emphasising that the deity is enlightened in both essence and appearance." He quotes Kelsang Gyatso on Dorje Shugden's appearance: "Some people believe that Dorje Shugdan is an emanation of Manjushri who shows the aspect of a worldly being, but this is incorrect. Even Dorje Shugdan’s form reveals the complete stages of the path of Sutra and Tantra, and such qualities are not possessed by the forms of worldly beings." According to Kay, Kelsang Gyatso downplays the oracle of Shugden, since it conflicts with his notion of Shugden being a Buddha:

[T]he oracle may have been marginalised by Geshe Kelsang because his presence raised a doctrinal ambiguity for the NKT. According to traditional Tibetan teachings, none of the high-ranking supramundane protective deities ‘would condescend to interfere with more or less mundane affairs by speaking through the mouth of a medium’. The notion of oracular divination may thus have been problematised for Geshe Kelsang in light of his portrayal of Dorje Shugden as a fully enlightened being.

=== Third-party views ===
==== Dorje Shugden Practitioners ====
According to Dreyfus, "The irony is that Shuk-den is presented by his followers as the protector of the Ge-luk (dge lugs) school, of which the Dalai Lama is the (de facto) leader."

According to Buddhist professor and Nyingma teacher John Markansky:

[S]ome Tibetan monks who now introduce Westerners to practices centred on a native Tibetan deity, without informing them that one of its primary functions has been to assert hegemony over rival sects! [...] Western followers of a few dGe lugs pa monks who worship that deity, lacking any critical awareness of its sectarian functions in Tibet, have recently followed the Dalai Lama to his speaking engagements to protest his strong stance (for non-sectarianism) in the name of their "religious freedom" to promulgate, now in the West, an embodiment of Tibetan sectarianism. If it were not so harmful to persons and traditions, this would surely be one of the funniest examples of the cross-cultural confusion that lack of critical reflection continues to create.

==== New Kadampa Tradition / Western Shugden Society claims ====
Scholar Jane Ardley explains the development of the claims of the WSS:

Worship of this figure is especially popular in eastern Tibet, and the present Dalai Lama prayed to Dorje Shugden for many years. However in 1976 the Dalai Lama announced he was advising against the practice because it was promoting sectarianism, which could potentially damage the Tibetan independence movement. Twenty years later, in 1996, the Dalai Lama went further and announced that members of both government departments and monasteries under the control of the Tibetan exile administration were forbidden from worshipping the spirit because the ‘practice fosters religious intolerance and leads to the degeneration of Buddhism into a cult of spirit worship’. This led to a massive outcry from Shugden supporters, particularly in Britain. The Dalai Lama was accused of religious intolerance and provided an opportunity that was not missed by Beijing, who used the dispute as a further reason to denounce the Dalai Lama.

Chryssides goes on to explain the claims specifically:

The dispute between Kelsang Gyatso and the Dalai Lama admits of no obvious resolution. The Dalai Lama stands accused of restricting the religious freedom of followers of Tibetan Buddhism, and of causing widespread suffering to Shugden supporters, who are not denied access to their protector deity, but who are the victims of persecution, unable to get jobs that relate to the Tibetan government-in-exile (for example, in schools), and are denied humanitarian assistance.

Ardley explains the political nature of the controversy:

the Dalai Lama, as a political leader of the Tibetans, was at fault in forbidding his officials from partaking in a particular religious practice, however undesirable. However, given the two concepts (religious and political) remain interwoven in the present Tibetan perception, an issue of religious controversy was seen as threat to political unity. The Dalai Lama used his political authority to deal with what was and should have remained a purely religious issue. A secular Tibetan state would have guarded against this.Ardley, Jane (2002), The Tibetan Independence Movement: Political, Religious and Gandhian Perspectives, London: RoutledgeCurzon, p. 172

==== Rejection of New Kadampa Tradition / Western Shugden Society claims ====
Some scholars reject the claims of the New Kadampa Tradition (NKT) and the Western Shugden Society (WSS). Robert Thurman, for example, states, "The cult and agency attack campaign is futile since its main claims are so easy to refute." Some scholars reject NKT/WSS claims that the 14th Dalai Lama has suppressed religious freedom, indicating that the situation is actually the opposite. Thurman says, "They then went on the attack, claiming they had been 'banned' and 'excommunicated', etc., when in fact the Dalai Lama was exercising his religious freedom by not accepting students who reject his advice, and actually go so far as to condemn him!"

Thurman explains:

However, the members of the cult are not content with this situation of having to choose between adopting His Holiness the Dalai Lama as their spiritual mentor or ignoring his judgment and persisting in the Gyalpo Shugden worship. They want to force their supposed mentor to adopt their perspective that the demonic spirit is an enlightened being, almost more important than the Buddha himself, and perhaps also rejoin their worship of it, or at least give them all his initiatory teachings in spite of their defiance of his best advice. So, they feel compelled to attack His Holiness, in order to force him to join their fundamentalist version of a Gelukpa outlook.

Regarding NKT/WSS claims that there is prohibition of Shugden, and therefore a repression of religious freedom, Thierry Dodin states, "No, such a prohibition does not exist. Religious freedom is not at issue here. No one, and most definitely not the Dalai Lama, is repressing religious freedom."

Nathan W. Hill, Lecturer in Tibetan and Linguistics at SOAS, University of London, states that the Dalai Lama does not control the Indian government or any other government:

This accusation makes no sense … the Dalai Lama is not head of any state; he has no military or police at his command; he has no political jurisdiction over which he can exercise suppression. Some members of the Gelug sect left the authority of the Dalai Lama in order to follow what they see as a purer form of religion. These people may not be very popular in other parts of the Gelug sect, but their human rights have not been violated nor their freedoms suppressed; even if some people did want to suppress or silence the pro-Shugen side, they simply have no means of doing so." (Note: Distance from Dalai Lama protests among differing opinions, May 8th, 2014, http://theforeigner.no/pages/news/distance-from-dalai-lama-protests-among-differing-opinions/ Archived 2014-10-17 at the Wayback Machine)

Similarly, Tibet scholar Robert Barnett of Columbia University states that "ID cards are not given out by the Tibetan government in exile, but by the Indian authorities". (Note: Tibet scholar denies making Time magazine Shugden comment, 2008-07-23, retrieved 2009-10-31.)

Barnett comments:

I also made it clear that the Western Shugden group's allegations are problematic: they are akin to attacking the Pope because some lay Catholics somewhere abuse non-believers or heretics. The Western Shugden Group is severely lacking in credibility, since its form of spirit-worship is heterodox, provocative and highly sectarian in Buddhist terms and so more than likely to be banned from mainstream monasteries – while its claimed concerns about cases of discrimination in India should be addressed by working within the Tibetan community instead of opportunistically attacking the Dalai Lama in order to provoke misinformed publicity for their sect.

Barnett noted that after the Dalai Lama prohibited his followers from engaging in Shugden rituals, Shugden practitioners in the Tibetan exile community faced persecution that the Dalai Lama's administration did not deal with particularly well, and he expressed concern that the controversy could hurt Tibetan causes. But Barnett said that claiming the difficulties faced by the Shugden practitioners are not a major human rights concern: "We see this being done under the name of human rights, which is not really quite what is at issue here."

==== New Kadampa Tradition demonstrations ====
Tibetologist Thierry Dodin states that it is the New Kadampa Tradition "that since the 1990s has held spectacular demonstrations whenever the Dalai Lama went to the West." According to Dodin, "The demonstrators are almost exclusively western monks and nuns, ordained in the New Kadampa Tradition (NKT) according to the group’s own ritual." Dodin also states, "The NKT can be described typologically as a cult on the basis of its organisational form, its excessive group pressure and blind obedience to its founder. The organisation’s extreme fanaticism and aggressive missionary drive are typical cult features too."

According to Robert Thurman, the International Shugden Community is a front group of the New Kadampa Tradition.

There is a group of former members who speak out against the New Kadampa Tradition and their demonstrations.

== Chinese government involvement ==
A 2015 Reuters article alleged "that the religious sect behind the protests has the backing of the Communist Party" and that the "group has emerged as an instrument in Beijing’s long campaign to undermine support for the Dalai Lama". (Note: Lague, David. Mooney, Paul. and Lim, Benjamin Kang. (21 December 2015). "The Long Arm of China Part 4". Reuters. Retrieved 21 December 2015.) The allegations have been challenged as they were not substantiated by concrete evidence. (Note: "Three times as many Buddhists as Communists in China: Dalai Lama’s Tibet wish may require rapprochement with former adversaries" HuffPost.)

According to Robert Thurman, Shugden activities are financed by the United Front Work Department of the Chinese Communist Party (CCP) as part of its strategy against the Dalai Lama, but there is "no documentary proof of a direct link between the NKT front groups ISC or WSS and the Communist United Front".

Raimondo Bultrini documents the Chinese government coordination of Shugden activity in the book The Dalai Lama and the King Demon. (Note: Raimondo Bultrini: "He wrote back a few days later, attaching some confidential information on Ganchen Tulku and "Nga lama" Kundeling. In March 1998, shortly after we met, these two men were in Kathmandu, Nepal, with other Shugden followers and a member of the Communist Party of the Autonomous Region of Tibet, Gungthang Ngodup, who had come especially from Lhasa. A few days afterwards, wrote Director Ngodup, an adviser from the Chinese embassy in Nepal, one "Mr. Wang", visited Ganchen’s house. As far as he could determine, the discussion revolved around the type of collaboration to be established between the Shugden followers and the Chinese authorities, including possible financial support. In December of the same year, as reported by the Indian Express and the Tribune, the under-secretary of the Chinese embassy in Delhi, Zhao Hongang, went to the Ganden Monastery in India, accompanied by a devotee from Bylakuppe, Thupten Kunsang, and a monk who had arrived from Sera Mey. In July 1999, also in Kathmandu, other meetings were held between pro-Shugden activists and Chinese representatives. This time, "Mr. Wang" met with Chimi Tsering and other directors of the Delhi "Shugden Society", Lobsang Gyaltsen, Konchok Gyaltsen, Gelek Gyatso, and Soepa Tokhmey, the society’s treasurer. After the final meeting, a letter was drafted to be presented to the United Front Department of the Communist Party to ask for help in countering those discriminating against Shugden practitioners in India…. In January 2000, after the meeting in Kathmandu between representatives of the cult and the Chinese emissaries, the Nepal National Dorje Shugden Society was born, with an office and a full-time staff of three, paid—according to the Dharamsala Security Services—with Communist Party funds funneled through the Chinese embassy. Ganchen Tulku was on the Committee of Consultants. ….Despite the formal denials of the cult’s practitioners, the common strategy of the Chinese authorities by now was obvious. In 2001 the Chinese ambassador was guest of honor at "The Millennium Conference on Human Rights" organized by the Shugden Devotees Religious and Charitable Society of Delhi and held March 20–22 at the most prestigious venue in the Indian capital, the India International Centre. If the reports of the pro-Shugden convention financed by the embassy were only "rumor" spread by World Tibetan News, the ambassador’s presence at the Millennium Conference was hard to reconcile with his routine duties as a diplomat.")

Warren Smith asserts that within Chinese-controlled territory, the Chinese government demanded that monks worship Shugden, in conjunction with forcing them to denounce the Dalai Lama and fly the flag of China.

According to Ben Hillman,

According to one senior lama from Sichuan, the Chinese government naturally allies itself with the Shugden supporters, not just to undermine the Dalai Lama, but because most Shugden worshippers come from Eastern Tibet, from areas that were only ever loosely under Lhasa’s jurisdiction and are today integrated into the Chinese provinces of Sichuan and Yunnan. Monks who had traveled across these areas note that the central government has allocated a disproportionate amount of funds since 1996 to pro-Shugden monasteries to assist them with construction and renovations. Evidence of local government favoritism toward the pro-Shugden faction began to emerge at S Monastery in 2003 when monks applied for permission to undertake studies in India. Despite equal numbers of applications from all khangtsens, of the 12 monks who were issued travel documents, only one was from an anti-Shugden khangtsen. Similarly, in 2004, one of the monastery’s smallest and (previously) poorest khangtsens began to build an elaborate new prayer room and residence for its handful of members. Financial support had been obtained from Beijing through a network of pro-Shugden lamas with access to officials at the highest level.

According to the Tibetologist Thierry Dodin, "China had encouraged division among the Tibetans by promoting followers of the Dorje Shugden sect to key positions of authority.

He also provides a couple of examples of the Chinese government's role in Shugden activity:

For instance, the construction of Shugden temples and monasteries is being subsidised by the State. We also know that most of the teachers surrounding the young man who in 1995 was designated as the Panchen Lama by the Chinese leadership, against the will of the Dalai Lama, belong to the Shugden group. I think these examples clearly demonstrate the role China is playing in this conflict.

Also the Central Tibetan Administration in India has stated that "In order to undermine the peace and harmony within the Tibetan people, China provides political and financial support to Shugden worshippers in Tibet, India and Nepal in particular, and in general, across the globe." And, in an on-line article published by the Times of India, a source in the Religion and Culture Department of the Tibetan Government in exile is quoted as saying that Dorje Shugden followers "have their people in all Tibetan settlements. We are worried about their sources of funding. It might be China or some other anti-Tibetan elements."

In December 2012, Lama Jampa Ngodrup, a promoter of the practice of Dorje Shugden, apparently became "the first Tibetan lama to be appointed by the Chinese Government to travel on an official trip abroad to give Dharma teachings."

According to propaganda observers, “the de-facto ban issued by the 14th Dalai Lama has generated considerable social tension and division in the diaspora, as well as in Tibetan society within China, leading the Chinese government to consider the Dorje Shugden controversy an important front for undermining what it says are efforts promoted by the 14th Dalai Lama aimed at destabilizing China. The religious hostility has been fed by considerable propaganda and counterpropaganda efforts during the last two decades … Significantly sensitive are the methodical efforts of the exiled government and its supporting NGOs to silence opposing voices in the controversy, using systematic defamation and coercive methods, including the use of modern disinformation means like coordinated troll campaigns on social media.” (Note: If Marco Polo were alive today, what tales would he tell about China and Tibet? Modern Diplomacy)

== Dissolution of International Shugden Community ==
In 2015, Reuters printed allegations that the anti-Dalai Lama Shugden protest campaigns were funded and manipulated by the Chinese Communist Party in order to discredit the Dalai Lama and the so-called "Dalai clique".

On March 10, 2016, the International Shugden Community suddenly suspended all operations. Its website was closed down leaving only the following message: "A Special Announcement: The Directors of the International Shugden Community previously announced that from 1 Dec 2015 they had decided to completely stop organising demonstrations against the Dalai Lama. Now, from the 10th March 2016 the International Shugden Community itself will dissolve, including its websites. May everybody be happy. Len Foley, Representative of the International Shugden Community." They added, "We are campaigning for an end to the discrimination against the people of our faith that the Dalai Lama has created"

== Tsem Tulku Rinpoche on ending the ban ==
Tsem Tulku Rinpoche (1965–2019), ordained at 22 by the 14th Dalai Lama, stood against the position of the Central Tibetan Administration in the Dorje Shugden controversy, and built the world's largest Dorje Shugden statue.

In February 2018, Tsem Rinpoche wrote:

[The Dorje Shugden] ban was formalised and made official with the passing of three resolutions in the Tibetan Parliament which stated clearly the Tibetan leadership’s reasons for discouraging and banning the practice...Dorje Shugden practitioners continue to be abused, belittled, ostracised and violently discriminated against. They are denied the treatment at clinics and hospitals in the Tibetan settlements, barred from shops and restaurants, and forbidden from holding any position in the Tibetan civil service. Their children are blacklisted and bullied at school. Shugden practitioners are shunned by their family and relatives; in the community, they are treated as pariahs.

In April 2019, a few months before his death, Tsem Rinpoche penned an article titled Dalai Lama Says We Can Practise Dorje Shugden Finally! In it, he writes, "His Holiness the Dalai Lama has compassionately shown a change in approach to the Dorje Shugden situation, and we are grateful for this...The gravity and levity of His Holiness the Dalai Lama’s announcements is very, very deep and also transcends everything." Rinpoche points to a 2016 video showing comments made by the Dalai Lama, as well as an article in Phayul.com from the same year, and an article on the Dalai Lama's website, all of which he summarized thusly:

These are the things His Holiness the Dalai Lama has said recently:

- His Holiness has said that Dorje Shugden does not harm him
- Since it does not harm him, it does not harm the Tibetan cause because the Dalai Lama is the upholder of the Tibetan cause
- His Holiness the Dalai Lama said we can practise Dorje Shugden
- His Holiness the Dalai Lama even said where we can go if we want to rely on Dorje Shugden, when he tells the audience that there are monasteries adjacent to Gaden and Sera that practise Dorje Shugden (Shar Gaden Monastery and Serpom Monastery)

== See also ==
- Tibetan Buddhism
- Gelug
- New Kadampa Tradition

== Sources ==
=== Printed sources ===
- Ardley, Jane (2002), The Tibetan Independence Movement: Political, Religious and Gandhian Perspectives, London: RoutledgeCurzon
- Bultrini, Raimondo (2013). The Dalai Lama and the King Demon: Tracking a Triple Murder Mystery Through the Mists of Time. New York: Tibet House / Hay House Incorporated. ISBN 978-0-9670115-23.
- Dalai Lama (1997), Concerning Dolgyal with Reference to the Views of Past Masters and other Related Matters, archived from the original on 2015-06-22
- Dreyfus, Georges (1998). "The Shugden Affair: Origins of a Controversy". Journal of the International Association of Buddhist Studies. 21 (2 (1998)). IABS: 227–270.
- Dreyfus, Georges B. J. (2003), The Sound of Two Hands Clapping: The Education of a Tibetan Buddhist Monk, University of California Press
- Dreyfus, Georges (2005). "Are We Prisoners of Shangrila?". Journal of the International Association of Buddhist Studies (1): 6–10.
- Gyatso (2002), Heart Jewel, Motilal Banarsidass
- Hillman, Ben (2005). "Monastic Politics and the Local State in China: Authority and Autonomy in an Ethnically Tibetan Prefecture". The China Journal. 54 (54). The University of Chicago Press: 29–51. doi:10.2307/20066065. JSTOR 20066065. S2CID 143677601.
- Kapstein, Matthew (1989), "The purificatory gem and its cleansing: a late Tibetan polemical discussion of apocryphal texts", History of Religions, 28 (3): 217–244, doi:10.1086/463159, S2CID 162360135
- Kapstein, Matthew (2000), The Tibetan Assimilation of Buddhism, Oxford
- Kay, David N. (October 1997). The New Kadampa Tradition and the Continuity of Tibetan Buddhism in Transition. Vol. 12. Journal of Contemporary Religion. pp. 277–293.
- Kay, David N. (2004). Tibetan and Zen Buddhism in Britain: Transplantation, development and adaptation. London: Routledge Curzon. pp. 44–52. ISBN 0-415-29765-6.
- Lopez, Donald (1998). Prisoners of Shangri-La: Tibetan Buddhism and the West. Chicago & London: University of Chicago Press. pp. 188–196. ISBN 978-0-226-49310-7.
- Lopez, Donald (1998b), "An Interview With Geshe Kelsang Gyatso", Tricycle: The Buddhist Review
- Makransky, John (2000), Introduction to Contemporary Academic Buddhist Theology; Its emergence and rationale. In: John J. Makransky, Roger Reid Jackson, "Buddhist Theology: Critical Reflections by Contemporary Buddhist Scholars", Routledge
- Mills, Martin A. (2003), This turbulent priest: contesting religious rights and the state in the Tibetan Shugden controversy. In: Human Rights in Global Perspective, Routledge, ISBN 0-415-30410-5
- Mills, Martin A. (2003b), Identity, Ritual and State in Tibetan Buddhism, Routledge, ISBN 0-7007-1470-7
- Mills, Martin A. (2009), "Charting the Shugden Interdiction in the Western Himalaya", in Bray, J.; R. Filibeck (eds.), Mountains, Monasteries and Mosques: Recent Research on Ladakh and the Western Himalaya, Alla Rivista Degli Studi Orientali, Supplementa No. 2, (n.s.), vol. 80, Rome: Fabrizio Serra Editore, pp. 251–270, ISBN 978-8862271882
- Nebesky-Wojkowitz, René de (1956). Oracles and demons of Tibet: the cult and iconography of the Tibetan protective deities. The Hague: Mouton.
- Schaik, Sam van (2011), Tibet: A History, Yale University Press
- Smith, Warren W. (2010), Tibet's Last Stand?: The Tibetan Uprising of 2008 and China's Response, Rowman & Littlefield Publishers, Inc
- Sparham, Gareth (1998), Memoirs of a Tibetan Lama, Ithaca, N.Y.: Snow Lion Publications
- Thurman, Robert (2013a), "The Dalai Lama And The Cult Of Dolgyal", HuffPost
- Thurman, Robert (2013b), Foreword. In: Bultrini (2013), "The Dalai Lama and the King Demon: Tracking a Triple Murder Mystery Through the Mists of Time", New York: Tibet House / Hay House Incorporated, ISBN 978-0-9670115-23
- von Brück, Michael (2001), Canonicity and Divine Interference: The Tulkus and the Shugden-Controversy. In: Dalmia, Malinar and Christof (eds.), "Charisma and Canon: the formation of religious identity in South Asia, New Delhi: Oxford University Press, ISBN 0195654536
- Watt, Jeff (2013), "Himalayan Buddhist Art 101: Controversial Art, Part 1 – Dorje Shugden", Tricycle: The Buddhist Review, The Tricycle Foundation
- Wilson, Mike (Spring 1999), "Schisms, murder, and hungry ghosts in Shangra-La. (internal conflicts in Tibetan Buddhist sect)", Cross, 49 (1)
- Wilson, Richard (2003), Human Rights in Global Perspective: Anthropological Studies of Rights, Claims and Entitlements, Routeledge, ISBN 0-415-30410-5
