= Tsem Tulku Rinpoche =

Kalmyk-Malaysian Buddhist teacher (1965–2019)

- Title: Tulku

Personal life
- Born: 24 October 1965 Taipei, Taiwan
- Died: 4 September 2019 (aged 53) Petaling Jaya, Selangor, Malaysia
- Website: http://www.kechara.com/ https://www.tsemrinpoche.com/

Religious life
- Religion: Buddhism
- School: Vajrayana
- Lineage: Gelug

Senior posting
- Teacher: Zong Rinpoche
- Successor: Tsem Yangsi Rinpoche

Tsem Tulku Rinpoche (24 October 1965 – 4 September 2019) was a recognised tulku of Kalmyk descent, an incarnate lama of the Gelug school of Tibetan Buddhism, and the founder and spiritual guide of Kechara House Buddhist Association with its headquarters in Malaysia.

Rinpoche was born on 24 October 1965 in Taiwan to a Tibetan father and Mongolian mother, and was adopted by an American-Mongolian family. His adoptive name was Burcha Bugayeff. In 1987, at the age of 22, Rinpoche received full ordination from the 14th Dalai Lama and became a monk of Ganden Shartse Monastery in India. Starting in 1992 Rinpoche lived in Malaysia where he commenced work on the establishment of Dharma Institutes. One of the institutes he founded is known as Kechara House Buddhist Association. He also founded a charity organization known as Kechara Soup Kitchen and the dharma retreat centre Kechara Forest Retreat.

In the meantime, Rinpoche took a stand against the position of the Central Tibetan Administration in the Dorje Shugden controversy and built the world's largest Dorje Shugden statue. Rinpoche strongly supported the Dorje Shugden religious practice, prohibited in 1996 by the Central Tibetan Administration, and was a critical voice advocating for the separation of politics and religion which is a feature of Tibetan Buddhism. He was known for his advice against the self-immolation protests by Tibetans in China. For his dissenting opinions, he was marked as a controversial Buddhist teacher although Rinpoche simultaneously advocated devotion for both the 14th Dalai Lama and the Dorje Shugden religious practice.

Rinpoche died on September 4, 2019, after a long illness.

== Major works ==
- Gurus for Hire: Enlightenment for Sale, Kechara Publications, 2005 ISBN 978-9834188788
- Faces of Enlightenment, Kechara Publications, 2006 ISBN 978-9834188764
- Why I Make Myself Unhappy, Kechara Publications, 2005 ISBN 978-9834188726
- Compassion Conquers All: Teachings on the Eight Verses of Mind Transformation, Kechara Publications, 2007 ISBN 978-9834188795,
- Nothing Changes Everything Changes, Kechara Publications, 2007 ISBN 978-9834188771, (Online)
- If Not Now, When?, Kechara Publications, 2008 ISBN 978-9834339944
- Snakes, Roosters & Pigs, Kechara Publications, 2011 ISBN 978-9675365317
- The Living Buddha Within, Kechara Publications, 2012 ISBN 978-9675365416
- The Promise (4th Edition), Kechara Publications, 2017 ISBN 978-9675365850
