= Dorje Shugden =

Deity in Tibetan Buddhism

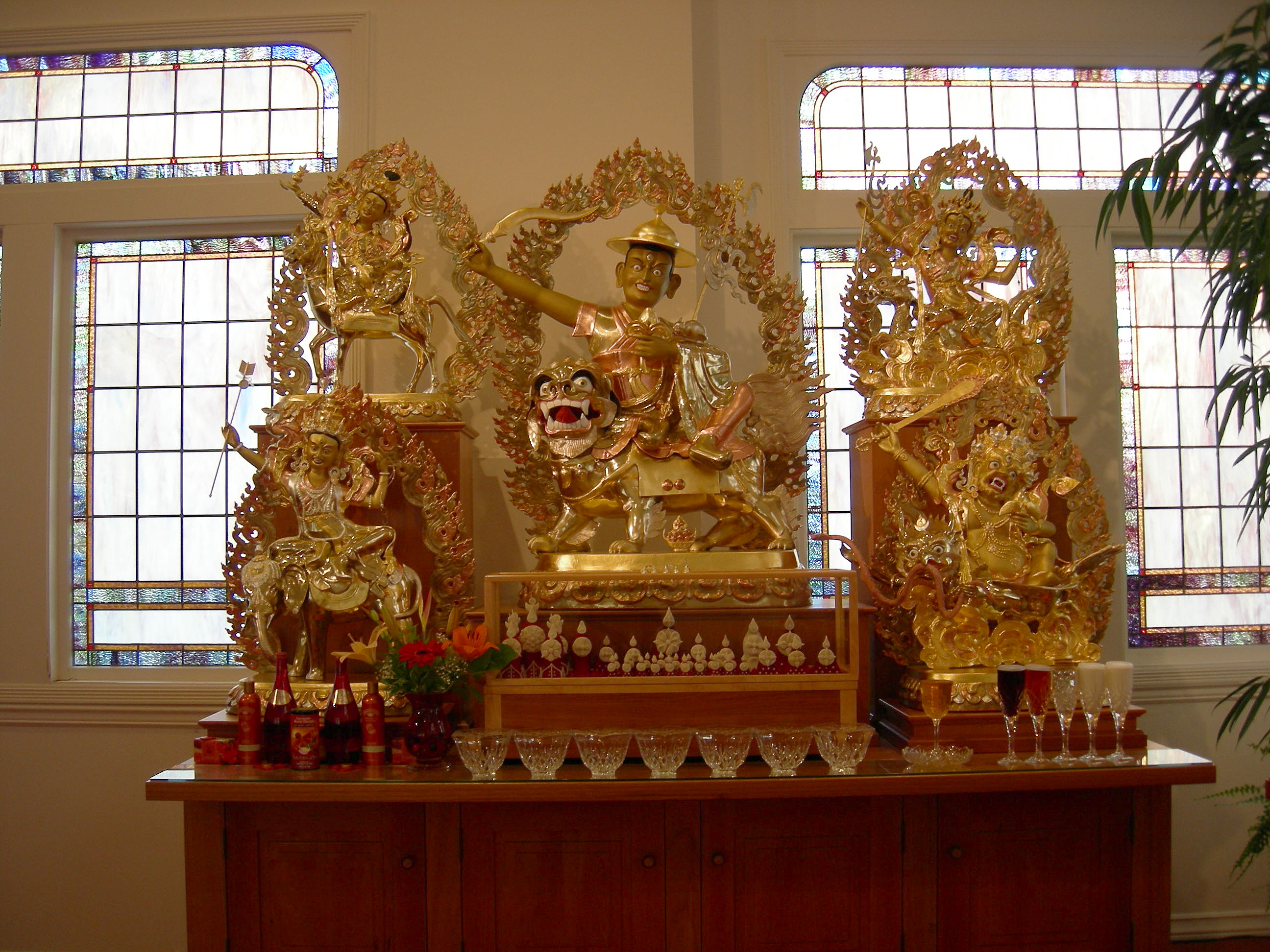
Statue of Dorje Shugden

Dorje Shugden (Standard Tibetan: རྡོ་རྗེ་ཤུགས་ལྡན་, Wylie: rdo rje shugs ldan, Tibetan pronunciation: [toːtɕe ɕuktɛ̃]), also known as Dolgyal and Gyalchen Shugden, is an entity associated with the Gelug school, the newest school of Tibetan Buddhism. Dorje Shugden is variously looked upon as: a destroyed gyalpo, a minor mundane protector, a major mundane protector, an enlightened major protector whose outward appearance is that of a gyalpo, or as an enlightened major protector whose outward appearance is enlightened.

Dorje Shugden was first worshipped as a minor spirit in Buddhism during the 17th century. In the 1930s, increased worship of Dorje Shugden under Pabongkhapa, who portrayed Shugden as a violent protector of the Gelug tradition, resulted in the Dorje Shugden controversy. Debates have centered on Dorje Shugden's nature and role—including his association with sectarianism, his place within traditional Gelug teachings, and whether he is enlightened or not—and the actions of his adherents in the International Shugden Community and the New Kadampa Tradition. Promoters of Dorje Shugden consider it the protector of the "pure dharma" of Tsongkhapa, traditionally regarded as the founder of the Gelug school.

== History ==
Dorje Shugden, also known as Dolgyal, was a gyalpo (or "angry and vengeful spirit") of South Tibet that was subsequently adopted as a "minor protector" of the Gelug school, the newest of the schools of Tibetan Buddhism, headed by the Dalai Lamas (although nominally the Ganden Tripas).

Dorje Shugden worship developed relatively recently within Buddhism, likely dating back to the 17th century at the earliest. According to early histories, the 5th Dalai Lama destroyed Shugden through fire ritual exorcism and tantric rituals. Later, adherents of Shugden said that the 5th Dalai Lama was unsuccessful.

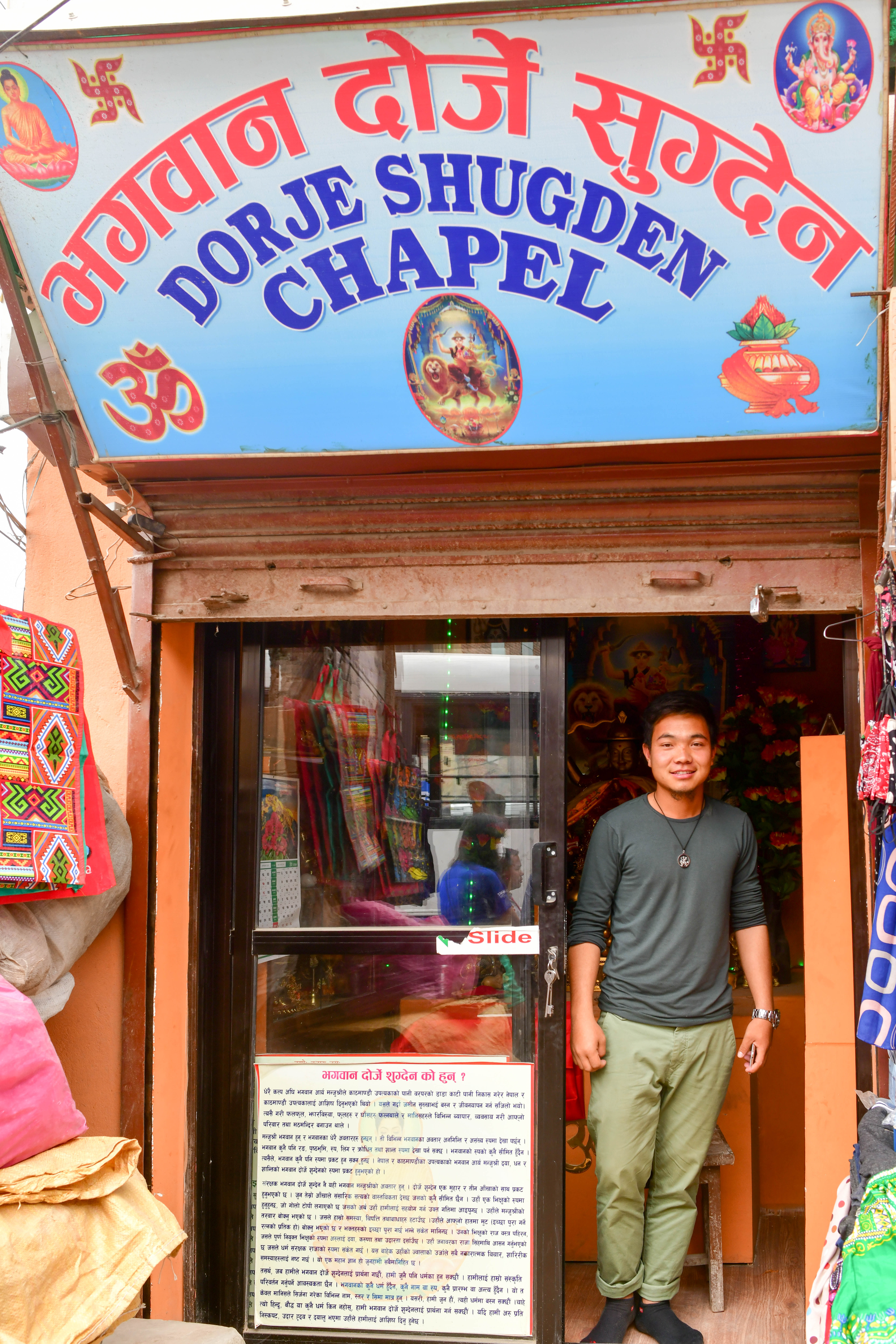
A local Dorje Shugden Chapel in Kathmandu

Dorje Shugden remained a minor Gelug protector until the 1930s when Pabongkhapa Déchen Nyingpo "started to promote him aggressively" as the main protector of the Gelug tradition. Pabongkhapa transformed Dorje Shugden's "marginal practice into a central element" of worship amongst his own disciples, replacing the original protectors appointed by Tsongkhapa and "replacing the traditional supra-mundane protectors" of the tradition. This change is reflected in artwork, since Dorje Shugden artwork is absent from the Gelug tradition before the end of the 19th century.

Pabongkhapa fashioned Shugden as a violent protector of the Gelug school, employing him against other traditions as a symbol of Gelug exclusivism. Shugden was a key symbol associated with Pabongkha's persecution of the Rimé movement, which promoted inclusivity and the sharing of practices across different strands of Buddhism. Nyingma Buddhists were also forcibly converted by Pabongkhapa and his disciples, and relics associated with Padmasambhava (a Buddha considered second only to Shakyamuni among the Nyingma) were destroyed. Pabongkhapa taught that Shugden was "the protector of the tradition of the victorious lord Manjushri", and thus replaced the traditional Gelug protectors Pehar, Nechung, Palden Lhamo, Mahakala, Vaisravana, and especially Kalarupa, who was traditionally believed to have been appointed by Tsongkhapa himself as the main Gelug protector.

The 13th Dalai Lama limited the practice of Shugden propitiation, after which Pabongkhapa apologized and promised not to practice Shugden worship any more.

== Characteristics ==
A characteristic of the iconography of Dorje Shugden is the central figure surrounded by four cardinal emanations. According to Nebresky-Wojkowitz, these are:

- East: The "body emanation" (sku'i sprul pa), which is white and has a mild expression (Vairochana Shugden)
- South: The "emanation of excellence" (Ratna Shugden)
- West: The "emanation of speech" (gsung gi sprul pa), which is white with "a slightly wild expression" (Pema Shugden)
- North: The "emanation of karma" ('phrin gyi sprul pa), which has with a green body and ferocious mood (Karma Shugden)

Dreyfus describes Dorje Shugden as "a fearsome deity, holding in his right hand a sword dripping with blood and in his left hand the heart torn out from the chest of its enemies". Frederick Bunce describes Dorje Shugden as baring fangs, with "three bloodshot eyes", and flames protruding from his eyebrows and facial hair. He has yellow-brown hair standing on end, and "his nostrils issue rain clouds with violent lightning". He holds a flaming sword in his right hand (khadga, ral-gri) and a skull-cup (kapala, thod-pa) filled with organs in his left. Under his arm, he carries "a mongoose (ichneumon or nakula, nehu-li) and golden goad/hook (ankusha, lcags-kyu)", and his body is bejeweled. He wears elephant skin on his top half, a tiger skin loincloth, a "five-skull crown", a "garland of fifty freshly severed heads", and an "apron of carved human bones". He stands on a "carpet of human skins on one hundred thousand thunderbolts (vajra, rdo-rje) on the back of a garuda-like bird (khyung)".

Michael von Brück describes Dorje Shugden as being "fierce and violent" and destroying all his enemies. He says animals are sacrificed to him symbolically, he lives among "skeletons and human skulls", near a blood of lake, with a dark-red body and facial expressions similar to rakshasas. He notes that none of these are unique to Dorje Shugden, being "more or less stereotypes for dharma-protectors in general".

=== Control under Vajrabhairava ===
In Phabongkhapa's text, Shugden is to be controlled by Vajrabhairava. Michael von Brück provides a translation of Phabongkhapa's text which states:

....the disciples visualize themselves as the yidam Vajrabhairava and as such invoke and control Shugden. The dharmapāla Shugden is presented to the disciples as the one who abides by their commands.

== New Kadampa Trust ==
According to the NKT, Dorje Shugden worship is "the very essence of the New Kadampa Tradition", and the protector is presented as the deity most able to help practitioners. The NTK's versions of The Heart Jewel and Wishfulfilling Jewel sādhanās, compiled by Kelsang Gyatso, incorporate the elements of the Dorje Shugden sādhanā. Dorje Shugden may also have influenced Geshe Kelsang's teaching that practitioners cannot mix with other traditions, a view which has been criticised by other Buddhists.

David Kay notes that Kelsang Gyatso, the founder of the New Kadampa Tradition, departed from Pabongkhapa and Trijang Rinpoche (his root guru) by stating that Dorje Shugden's appearance is enlightened, rather than worldly. Kelsang Gyatso explicitly rejected the idea that Dorje Shugden was worldly rather than a Buddha, and made Dorje Shugden worship central to the practices of the New Kadampa Tradition.

Both Dreyfus and Kay note that Shugden is generally considered a worldly being. Dreyfus says the view that Shugden is enlightened exists only amongst the "most extreme followers of Shukden". He says the viewpoint among the New Kadampa Tradition that it is "a proper object of refuge and worshiped as such" appears unique to that sect. Kay states that the view of Shugden as an enlightened being "is both a marginal viewpoint and one of recent provenance".

In 1996, Kelsang Gyatso was formally expelled from the Sera Je Monastery and his geshe degree voided as a result of his support for Dorje Shugden and criticism of the Dalai Lama.

== Oracle ==
As with other spirits in Tibet, there is an oracle of Dorje Shugden. According to René Nebesky-Wojkowitz, the best-known Dorje Shugden oracle "lives at a shrine in Lhasa called sPro bde khang gsar Trode Khangsar (rgyal khang) or sPro khang bde chen lcog".

According to Joseph Rock, there were two main Dorje Shugden oracles: Panglung Choje and Trode Khangsar Choje. Rock witnessed and documented a public invocation of the Panglung Oracle in Kham (Eastern Tibet) in 1928. At that time, the oracle took a sword of Mongolian steel and twisted it into many loops. Choyang Duldzin Kuten Lama was a Dorje Shugden oracle for many years.

Kay notes the presence of an oracle of Shugden conflicts with Kelsang Gyatso's portrayal of Shugden as a Buddha, since Buddhas do not have oracles. He suggests that "the oracle may have been marginalised by Geshe Kelsang because his presence raised a doctrinal ambiguity for the NKT".

== See also ==
- Dorje Shugden controversy
- Gyalpo

== Sources ==
- Blomfield, Vishvapani (2022-10-14). "Kelsang Gyatso obituary". The Guardian. ISSN 0261-3077.
- "Sera Je Monastery: Declaration of Expulsion". Shambhala Pubs. Translated by Gendun Gyatso and David Patt. 2017-03-06.
- Waterhouse, Helen (1997). Buddhism in Bath: Adaptation and Authority (PDF). Community Religions Project Monograph. Oxford University Press. ISBN 1871363055.
