= Western Shugden Society =

- Abbreviation: WSS
- Predecessor: Shugden Supporters Community
- Type: Non-governmental organization
- Headquarters: Unknown. Official address given, "Studio 177, 56 Tavistock Place, London, WC1H 9RG UK", is a rented mailbox
- Parent organization: International Shugden Community
- Affiliations: New Kadampa Tradition (NKT)
- Website: www.westernshugdensociety.org Archived July 3, 2015, at the Wayback Machine, internationalshugdencommunity.com

The Western Shugden Society (or WSS) was a campaign group that advocated for worship of Dorje Shugden within Tibetan Buddhism, and which dissolved itself, along with its parent organisation, the International Shugden Community, after a 2015 Reuters investigation determined that the religious sect had the backing of the Chinese Communist Party and had emerged as an instrument in Beijing's long campaign to undermine support for the Dalai Lama. Many members were also members of the New Kadampa Tradition. The WSS considered Kelsang Gyatso, who founded the NKT, the final teacher in the Dorje Shugden "spiritual lineage". Inform, a charity which advises people about new religious movements, describes the WSS as a "front organisation" for the NKT.

== Aims ==
According to their website, the aims of the WSS are

- To free practitioners who rely upon the enlightened deity Dorje Shugden and their families from suffering;
- To restore peace and harmony between Shugden and non-Shugden practitioners;
- To re-establish the common spiritual activities of Shugden and non-Shugden practitioners in Tibetan monasteries;
- To free Buddhism from pollution by politics

== Academic views ==
Robert Barnett of Columbia University is critical of the WSS:

I also made it clear that the Western Shugden group's allegations are problematic: they are akin to attacking the Pope because some lay Catholics somewhere abuse non-believers or heretics. The Western Shugden Group is severely lacking in credibility, since its form of spirit-worship is heterodox, provocative and highly sectarian in Buddhist terms and so more than likely to be banned from mainstream monasteries – while its claimed concerns about cases of discrimination in India should be addressed by working within the Tibetan community instead of opportunistically attacking the Dalai Lama in order to provoke misinformed publicity for their sect.

== International Shugden Community ==
The International Shugden Community was registered as a company in Norway and California. Its Norwegian directors were teachers at the Nordic Kadampa Meditation Centre in Oslo, which is part of the New Kadampa Tradition. Its American directors included teachers at Tushita Meditation Center, Westlake, California and Manjushri Kadampa Meditation Center, Ulverston (the NKT's first and main centre).

== Dissolution ==
A 2015 Reuters investigation determined "that the religious sect behind the protests has the backing of the Communist Party" and that the "group has emerged as an instrument in Beijing’s long campaign to undermine support for the Dalai Lama". Lama Tsetsa, a monk who had formerly been a part of the Shugden movement, said the Chinese United Front Work Department had paid him and a small number of other Tibetans within the organisation to stage protests against the Dalai Lama. After the Reuters investigation revealed that China backs it, the International Shugden Community halted operations and disbanded.

== See also ==
- Dorje Shugden controversy

== Sources ==
- Kay, David N. (2004). Tibetan and Zen Buddhism in Britain: Transplantation, development and adaptation (PDF). London: Routledge Curzon. ISBN 0-415-29765-6. Archived from the original (PDF) on 1 July 2017.
