= Aldershot Buddhist Centre =

Coordinates: 51.2486°N 0.7564°W

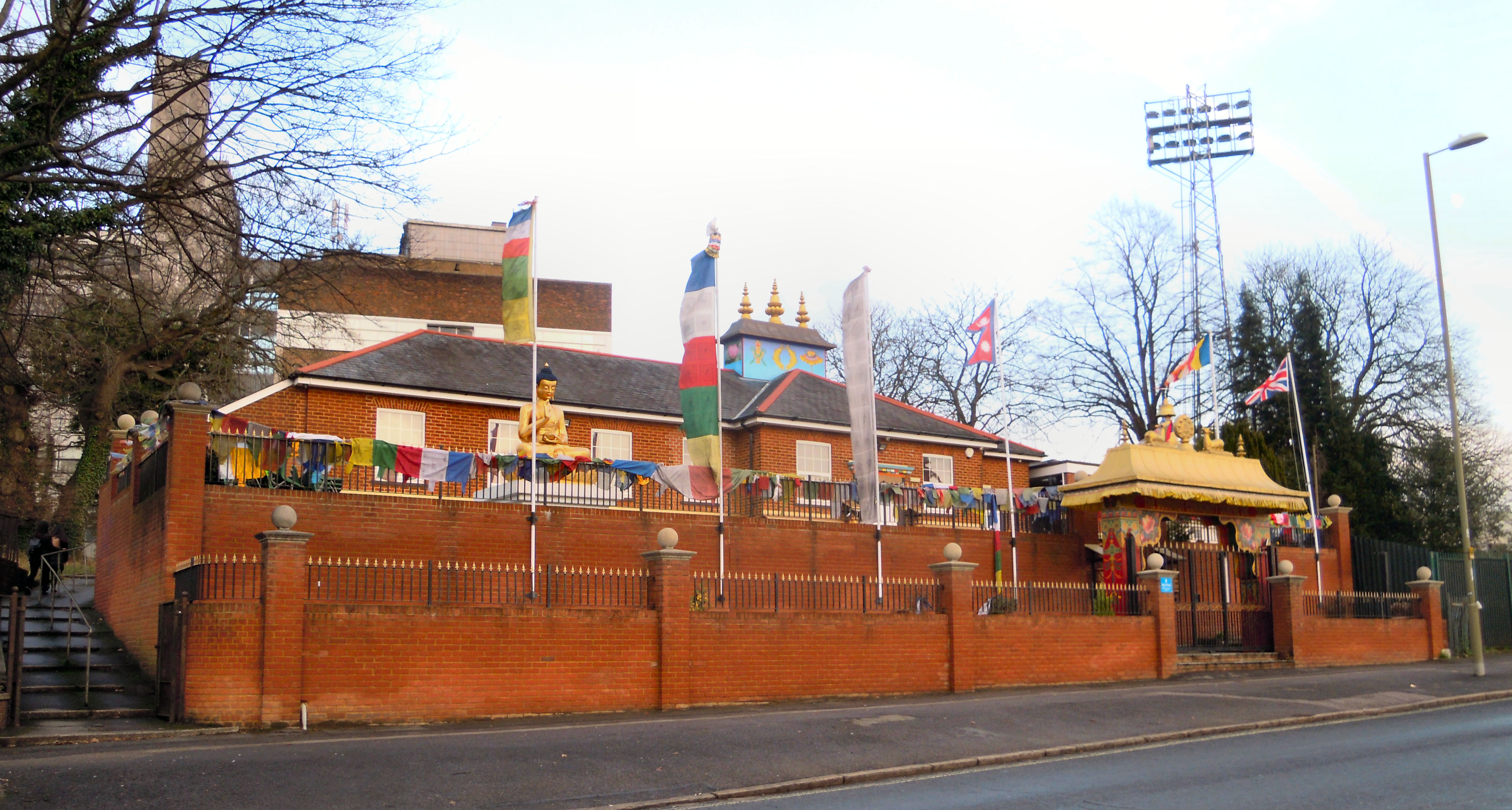
Aldershot Buddhist Centre in 2018

Aldershot Buddhist Centre (also the Buddhist Community Centre UK or BCCUK) is a Buddhist temple and community centre catering for the Buddhists of Aldershot in Hampshire and surrounding area. Opened in 2015, it describes itself as the United Kingdom's first Buddhist community centre.

With the influx of large numbers of Nepalis into the area in recent years giving Rushmoor the largest Buddhist community in the United Kingdom, a need for a temple and community centre to cater for their spiritual and secular needs was required. The Buddhist Community Centre UK was founded in 2007 by the founder and chairman Kaji Sherpa. The former Labour Exchange building (later the sports and social club for British Telecom staff) beside the Recreation Ground on the High Street being empty, this was purchased and converted.

The centre and associated monastery were formally opened on 29 June 2015 by the 14th Dalai Lama who is also the centre's patron. The visit to Aldershot of the Dalai Lama was greeted with protests by members of the Shugden Buddhist denomination who accused him of pursuing a policy of apartheid within the Buddhist community. After blessing the centre the Dalai Lama gave a speech which included a call for an end to religious divisions, and after the ceremony he moved to the Aldershot Town football stadium where a large crowd heard him speak on Buddhism in the 21st-century. Other noted Rinpoche to visit the centre include Dilgo Khyentse Yangsi, Phakchok Rinpoche, Sogyal Rinpoche, Chime Rinpoche, Lopön Tenzin Namdak, and Chökyi Nyima Rinpoche.

In November 2018 thieves stole £10,000 in donations from the centre in a distraction burglary.

== Gallery ==
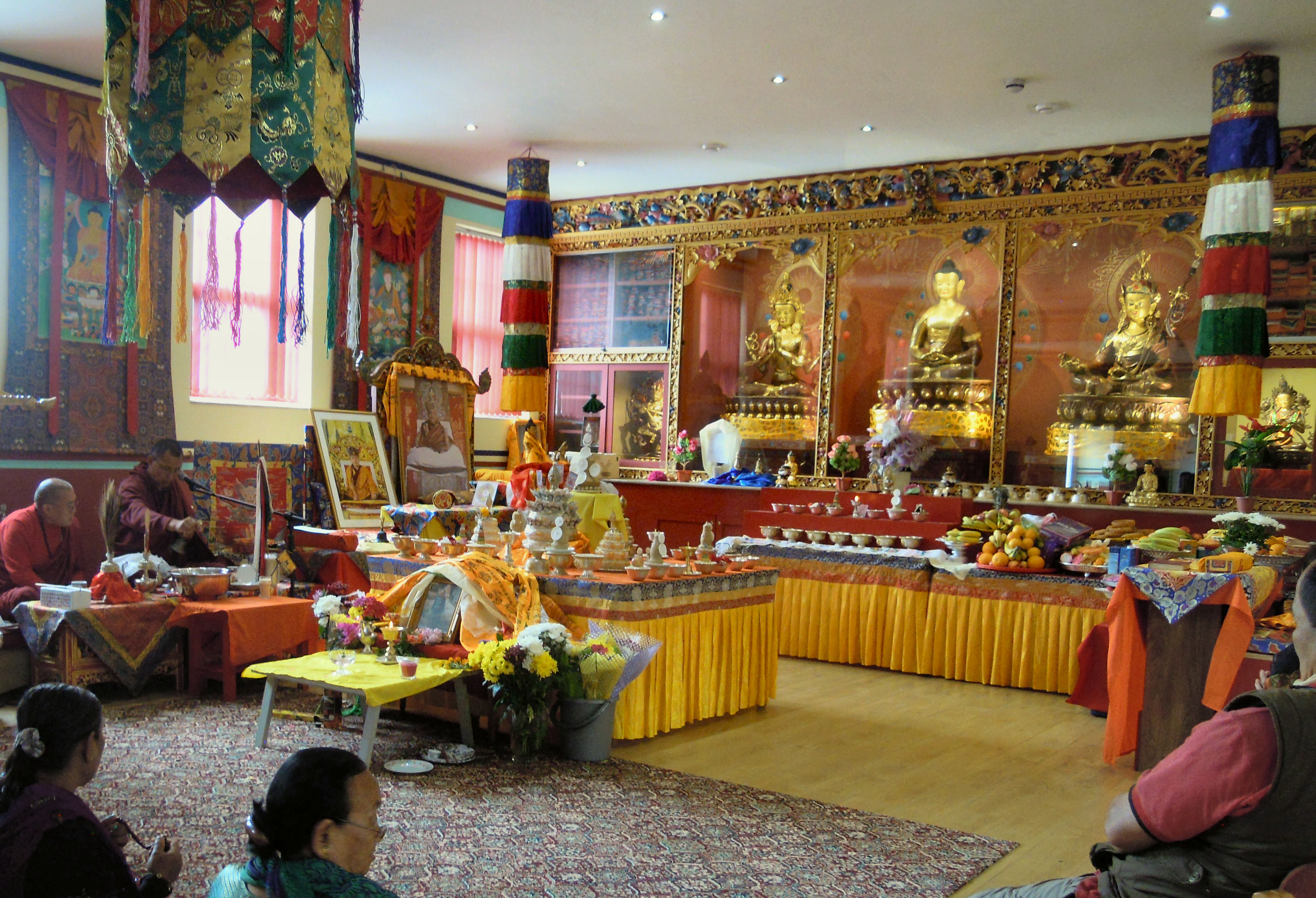
The temple area

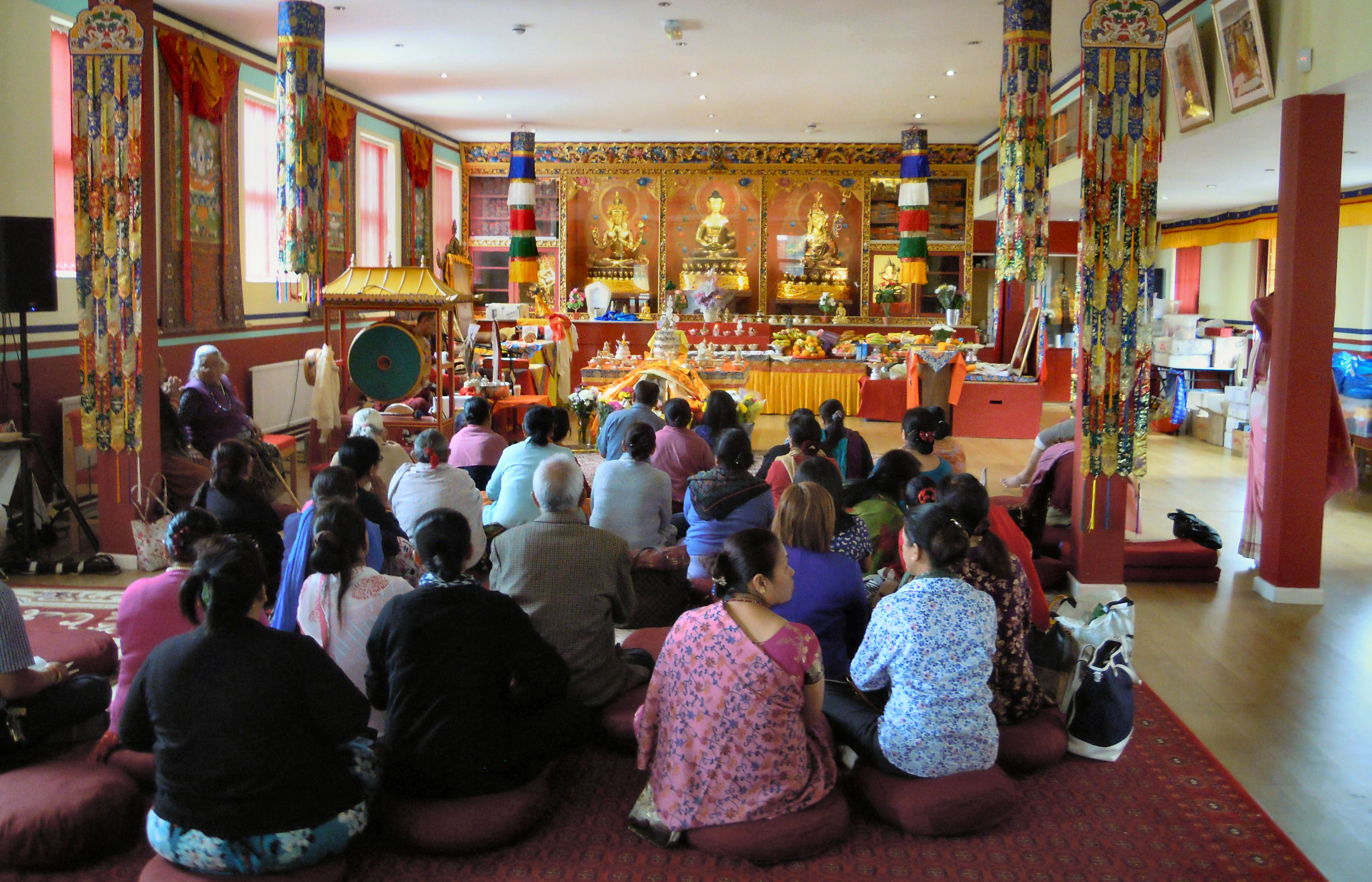
Inside the temple

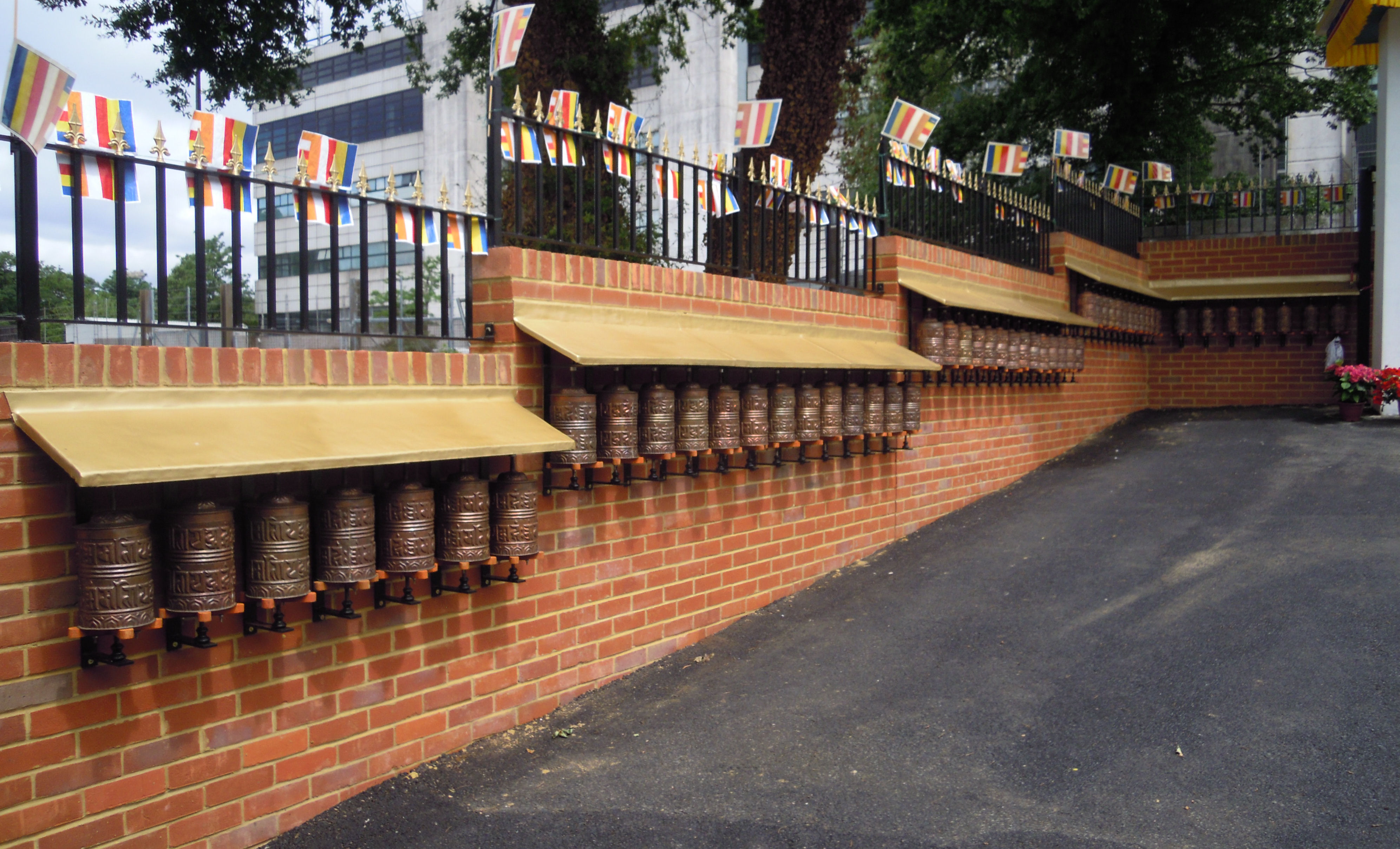
Prayer wheels in the courtyard

== See also ==
- Ñāṇavīra Thera, (1920-1965), Aldershot-born Theravāda Buddhist monk
