= Kechara Soup Kitchen =

Malaysian nonprofit organization

Kechara Soup Kitchen (KSK) is a non religious, non-profit organization operating in Malaysia. It provides food, healthcare, education and other facilities to the homeless and urban poor. It was founded in 2006 by Tsem Tulku Rinpoche.

Apart from the Soup Kitchen, KSK also has other programs like the Food Bank program and Empowerment program. The Food Bank program began in the year 2012. It is targeted at collecting surplus food from stores and restaurants and supplying them to low-income families nationwide. Through the Empowerment program, KSK provides single mothers and underprivileged individuals with skills - like sewing and baking- making rugs or bags and cookies which can help them sustain themselves

== See also ==
- Hunger relief
- List of food banks
- Soup kitchen
- Food Bank
- Empowerment
