= Lobsang Gyatso (monk) =

Tibetan monk (1928–1997)

Lobsang Gyatso (1928–1997) was a Tibetan monk who founded the Institute of Buddhist Dialectics in Delhi, India.

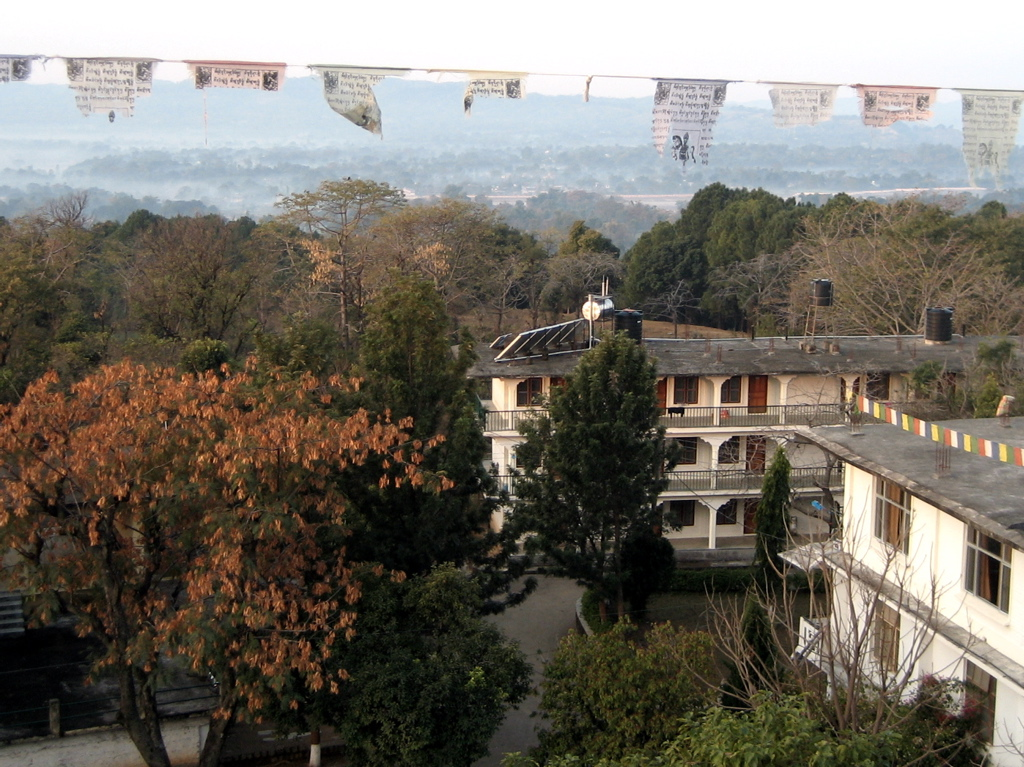
The Institute of Buddhist Dialectics in Dharamsala.

== Biography ==
Lobsang Gyatso was born in Tibet in the area of Kham in 1928. He became monk at the age of 11 and studied at Drepung monastery. During the 1959 Tibetan uprising he fled Tibet as part of the Tibetan Exile Community in India.

He founded in 1973 the Institute of Buddhist Dialectics in Dharamsala and in 1991 the College for Higher Tibetan Studies in Sarah, two non-profit educational institutions.

He is the author of several books in Tibetan that were translated in several languages.

== Death ==
On February 4, 1997, the principal of the Buddhist School of Dialectics, Geshe Lobsang Gyatso was murdered in Dharmasala, along with two of his students. David Kay notes "The subsequent investigation by the Indian police linked the murders to the Dorje Shugden faction of the exiled Tibetan community."

In June 2007, The Times reported that Interpol had issued a Red notice to China for extraditing two of the alleged killers, Lobsang Chodak and Tenzin Chozin.

Robert Thurman notes that the alleged killers had their origin within China as well.

=== Relation to Shugden practitioners ===
Prithvi Raj (PR), Chief Police of Kangra District said: "We have identified two of the murderers, and we have clear indications that the murderers are directly linked to the Dorje Shugden association and directly connecting these murderers with the case. But so far we have not been able to arrest them. One is called Tenzin Chozin, the other is called Lobsang Chodrak. Before the murder, the principal received threatening letters from the Shugden association."

== Reincarnation ==
In 2006, a nine-year-old boy named Tulku Tsenyi Khentrul Tenzin Tseten Rinpoche was said to be the reincarnation of Lobsang Gyatso by the 14th Dalai Lama.

== Bibliography of Lobsang Gyatso ==
- The Four Noble Truths, Snow Lion Publications, 1994, ISBN 1-55939-027-1
- Bodhicitta: Cultivating the Compassionate Mind of Enlightenment, Snow Lion Publications, 1997, ISBN 1-55939-070-0
- Memoirs of a Tibetan Lama, Snow Lion Publications, 1998, ISBN 1-55939-097-2
- Harmony of Emptiness and Dependent-Arising, Paljor Publications, (LTWA) India, 1992, ISBN 81-85102-83-X
