= Trode Khangsar =

Tibetan Buddhist monastery located in Lhasa, Tibet, China

Tibetan name
- Tibetan: སྤྲོ་བདེ་ཁང་གསར
Transcriptions
- Wylie: spro bde khang gsar

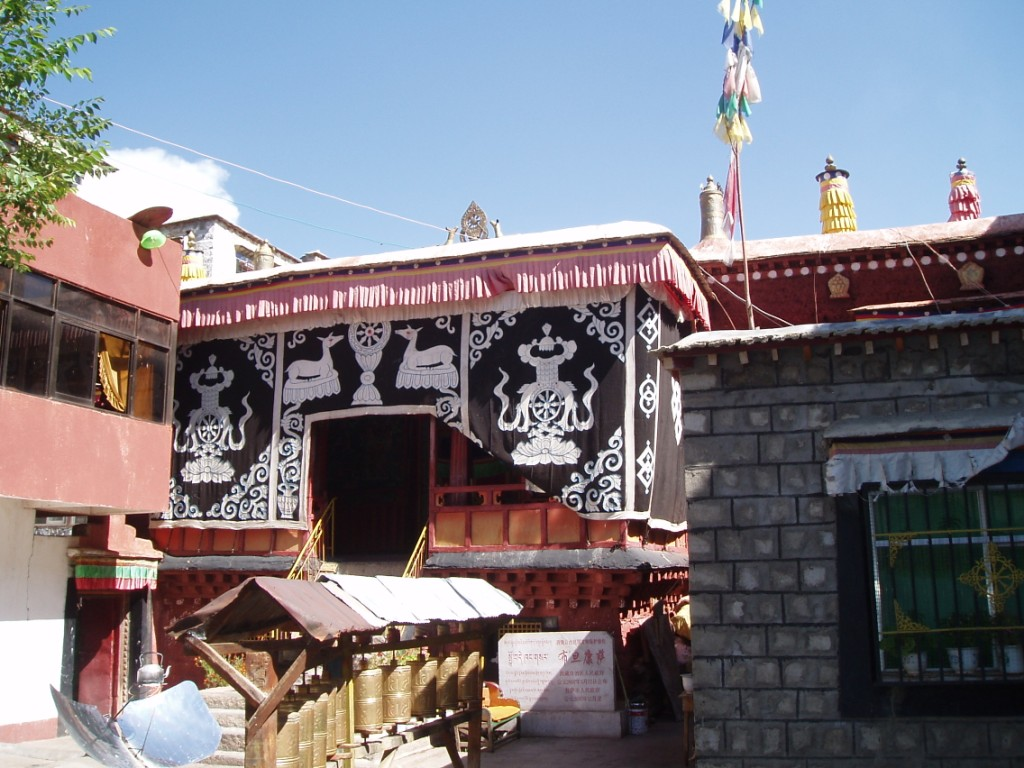
Trode Khangsar, the Temple dedicated to Dorje Shugden by the Fifth Dalai Lama

Trode Khangsar (Tibetan: སྤྲོ་བདེ་ཁང་གསར, Wylie: spro bde khang gsar) is a temple (Tibetan: བཙན་ཁང, Wylie: btsan khang) located in Lhasa, Tibet Autonomous Region, China, that is over 300 years old. The temple is dedicated to the protector Dorje Shugden and has been traditionally managed by the Gelug monastery Riwo Chöling, which is located in the Yarlung valley.

== Origin ==
=== Protector ===
Dorje Shugden is regarded by many practitioners as a dharmapala reincarnated from the lama Tulku Dragpa Gyaltsen (1619-1656), a contemporary of the 5th Dalai Lama. After Tulku Dragpa Gyaltsen was killed, the Fifth Dalai Lama tried to subjugate his angry spirit through various rituals which, according to one account, were unsuccessful.

== Function ==
In addition to being a shrine, Trode Khangsar housed monks from Riwo Choling and an oracle for invoking Dorje Shugden. It has been restored and reclaimed by Riwo Choling since the Cultural Revolution.

== Inventory ==
A survey of Tibetan wood printing blocks in monasteries, conducted while Tagdrag (stag brag) Rinpoche was regent of Tibet (1941-1950), lists Trode Khangsar having wood blocks for printing an extensive Dorje Shugden fulfilling ritual (chos skyong shugs ldan gyi bskang chog rgyas pa) which was authored by Ganden Jangtse Serkong Dorje Change (1856-1918), an earlier lineage holder of Kalachakra. Serkong Dorje Chang "served as dbu bla of the Bhutanese ruler o rgyan dbang phyug."

A print of these woodblocks was published later in which Serkong Dorje Chang states he included parts of rituals written by Morchen Dorje Chang of the Sakya order and Dre'u Lhas, the recognized fourth reincarnation of Drukpa Kunleg, of the Drukpa Kagyu order.

== See also ==
Dorje Shugden
