= Velké Hoštice =

- Municipality
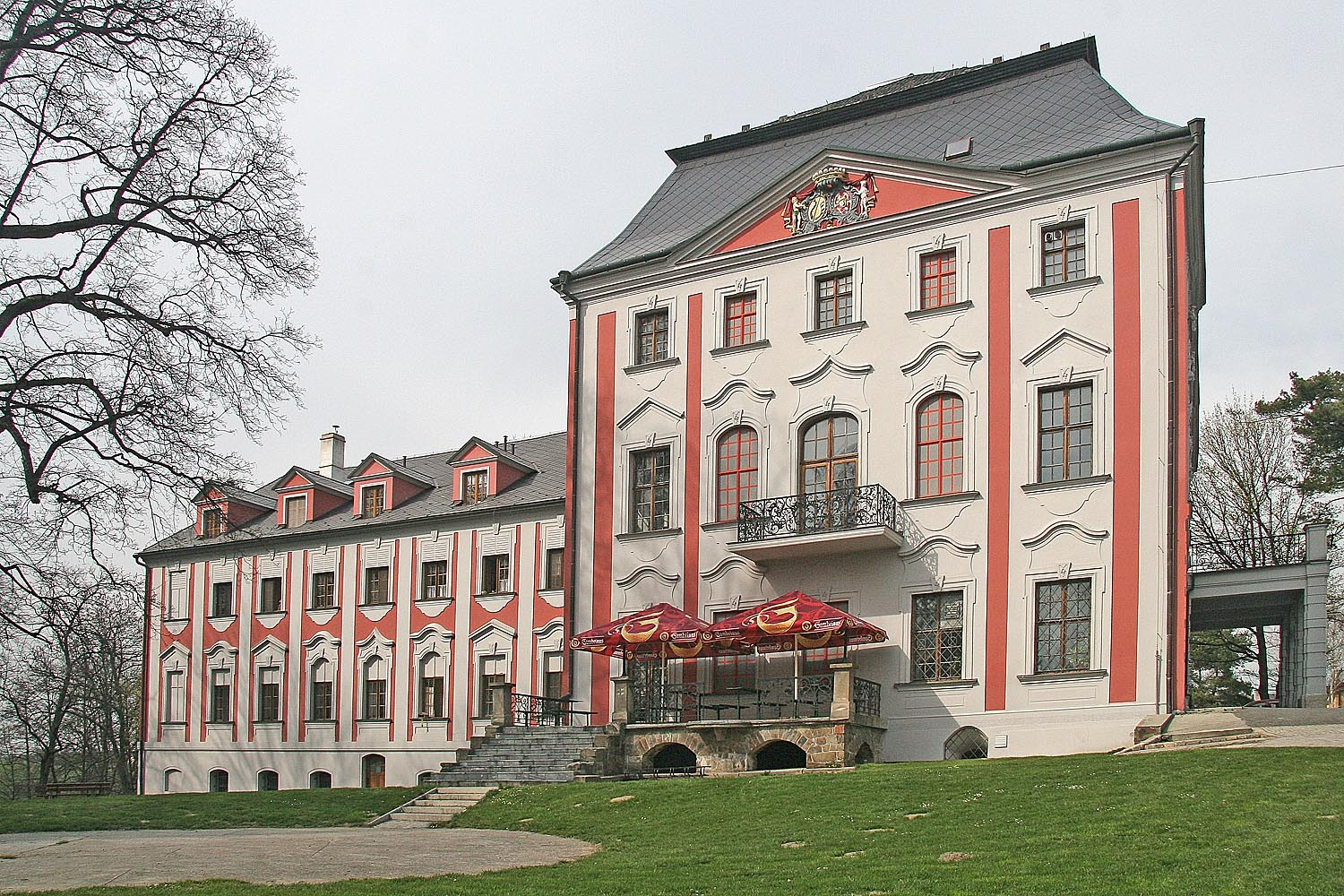
- Velké Hoštice Castle

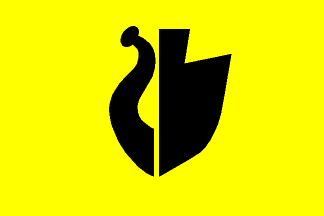
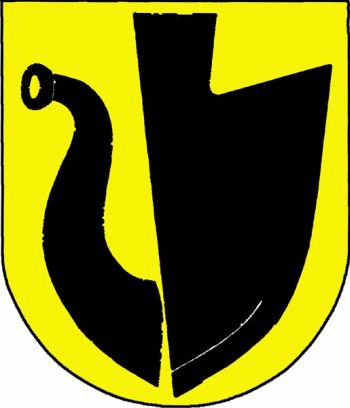
- Flag Coat of arms

- Location in the Czech Republic
- Coordinates: 49°56′10″N 17°58′26″E
- Country: Czech Republic
- Region: Moravian-Silesian
- District: Opava
- First mentioned: 1222

Area
  - Total: 10.04 km^{2} (3.88 sq mi)
- Elevation: 252 m (827 ft)

Population (2026-01-01)
  - Total: 1,846
  - Density: 183.9/km^{2} (476.2/sq mi)
- Time zone: UTC+1 (CET)
  - Summer (DST): UTC+2 (CEST)
- Postal code: 747 31
- Website: www.hostice.cz

Velké Hoštice (German: Groß Hoschütz) is a municipality and village in Opava District in the Moravian-Silesian Region of the Czech Republic. It has about 1,800 inhabitants. It is part of the historic Hlučín Region.

== Geography ==
Velké Hoštice is located about 4 kilometres (2 mi) east of Opava and 20 km (12 mi) northwest of Ostrava. It lies in an agricultural landscape in the Opava Hilly Land. It is situated near the Opava River, which forms the southern municipal border.

== History ==
The first written mention of Velké Hoštice is from 1222, when the village was bequeathed to the monastery in Velehrad. From the beginning of the 14th century until 1420 it was property of the lords of Kravaře. In the following centuries the village changed owners frequently, including burghers and lower nobles. In 1639, half of the village was destroyed by fire.

From 1742 to 1918, after Empress Maria Theresa had been defeated, the village belonged to Prussia. In 1754, the Velké Hoštice estate was inherited by Count Ignác Dominik Chorynský of Ledská, who was its most important owner. He made Velké Hoštice a cultural centre and had built the Baroque castle. After the castle under construction and most of the village were destroyed by fire in 1765, the count was responsible for the restoration of the village and the castle, and also had a church built.

== Demographics ==
Historical population

Year	Pop.	±%
1869	1,125	—
1880	1,094	−2.8%
1890	1,122	+2.6%
1900	1,168	+4.1%
1910	1,146	−1.9%

Year	Pop.	±%
1921	1,269	+10.7%
1930	1,558	+22.8%
1950	1,399	−10.2%
1961	1,564	+11.8%
1970	1,466	−6.3%

Year	Pop.	±%
1980	1,588	+8.3%
1991	1,613	+1.6%
2001	1,657	+2.7%
2011	1,756	+6.0%
2021	1,772	+0.9%

Source: Censuses

== Transport ==
The I/56 road from Ostrava to Opava passes through the town.

Velké Hoštice is located on the railway line Opava–Hlučín.

== Sights ==
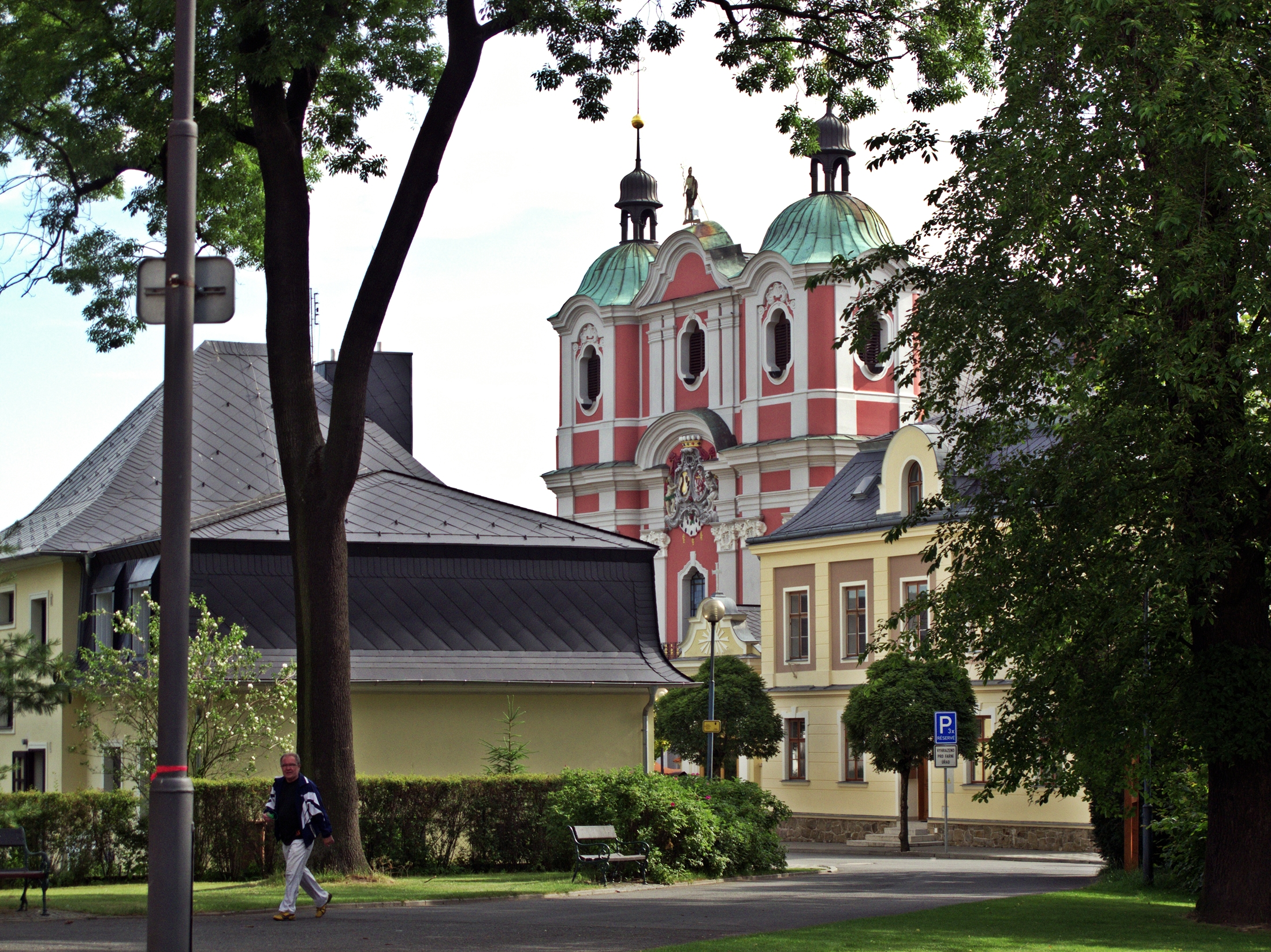
Church of Saint John the Baptist

Velké Hoštice Castle is a late Baroque castle with rich Rococo decor. Today the castle is owned by the municipality. The castle is used for social and commercial purposes, and houses an archaeological exhibition and an exhibition of recent history of the municipality.

The second landmark of Velké Hoštice is the Church of Saint John the Baptist. It was built in the late Baroque style in 1773.

== Notable people ==
- René de Nebesky-Wojkowitz (1923–1959), ethnologist and Tibetologist
