= Gyalpo spirits =

Spirits in Tibetan mythology

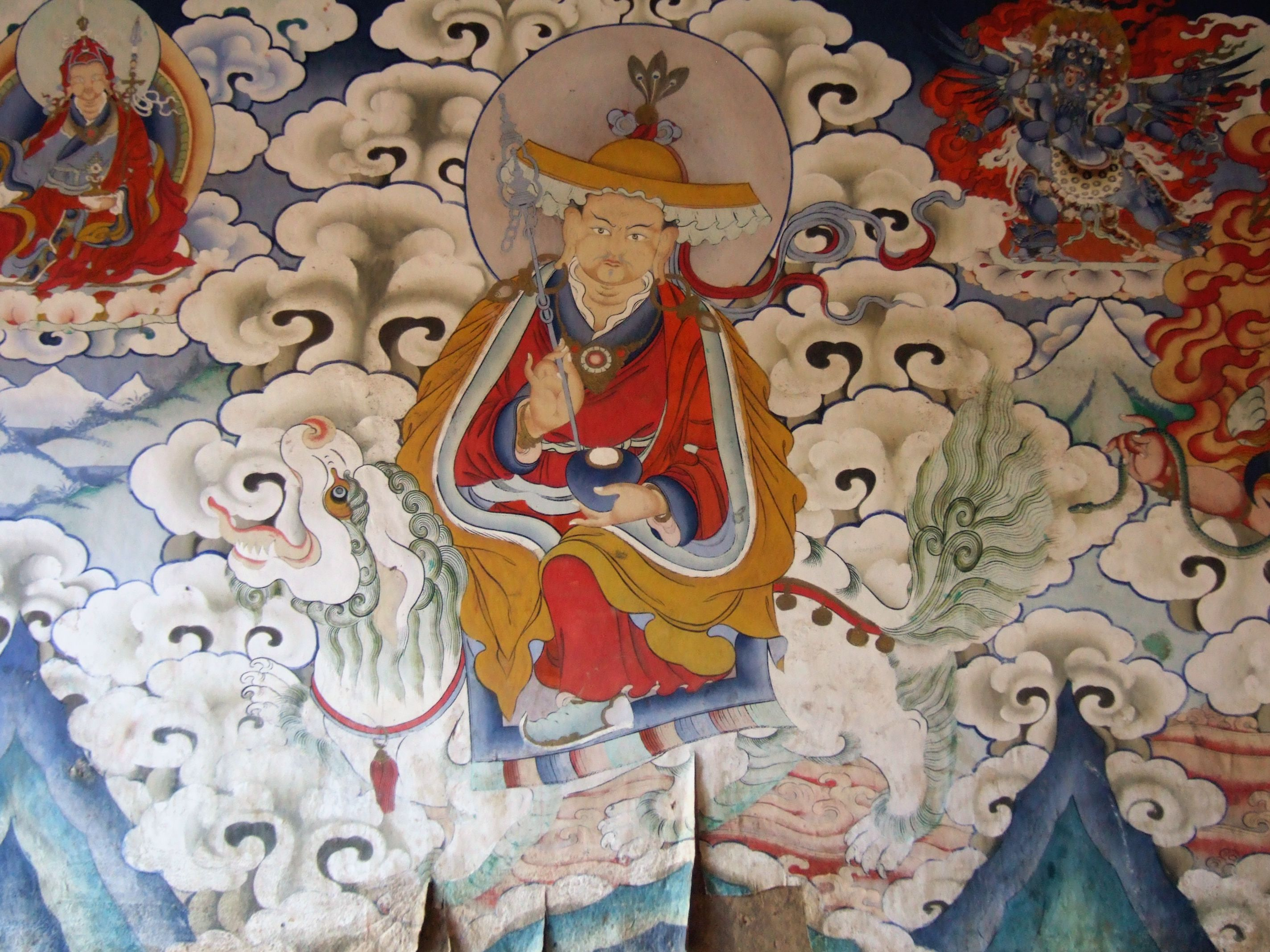
A gyalpo dharmapāla in peaceful aspect, Gangteng Monastery

Gyalpo spirits are one of the eight classes of gods and demons (Wylie: lha srin sde brgyad) in Tibetan mythology and religion. Gyalpo (Tibetan: རྒྱལ་པོ་, Wylie: rgyal po), a word which simply means "king" in the Tibetic languages, in Tibetan mythology is used to refer to the Four Heavenly Kings (Tibetan: རྒྱལ་ཆེན་བཞི་) and especially to a class of spirits, both Buddhist and Bon, who may be either malevolent spirits or oath-bound as dharmapalas (Wylie: chos skyong, bon skyong).

== Nature ==
Geoffrey Samuel describes these gyalpo spirits as "king-spirits" who are "the spirits of evil kings or of high lamas who have failed their vows." He also states that they are white in color. De Nebesky-Wojkowitz characterizes this type of spirit as generally red in colour and of violent character, harassing mainly lamas and religious people, but also laity and even animals. In fact, gyalpo spirits often have both white (peaceful) and red (wrathful) forms. Kelzang Tashi describes two types of gyalpo spirits: big "king- spirits" and small gyalpo spirits that relate to one's household or family.

It is believed one can be protected against gyalpo spirits by means of appropriate rituals. In religious meditation instructions texts attributed to Padmasambhava, he warns his disciples against magical displays of this class of spirits.

Some gyalpos are believed to be bound by oath by Padmasambhava. For example, Gyalpo Pehar is believed to be the main guardian of Samye, built at the time of Padmasambhava and King Trisong Detsen.

Machig Labdrön enumerated outer, inner and secret ways gyalpo spirits manifest. The outer way are very elegant temples with beautiful ornaments, crystal stupas and many offerings, rich with silver and gold, with well dressed monks giving teachings, full of charisma; their characteristic provocation is nervousness and confusion. Tulku Urgyen Rinpoche (1920–1996) wrote that as gyalpos often manifest as great masters, spiritual teachers, or enlightened beings, several highly realised practitioners of the past fell for their tricks.

== Gyalpo Pehar ==
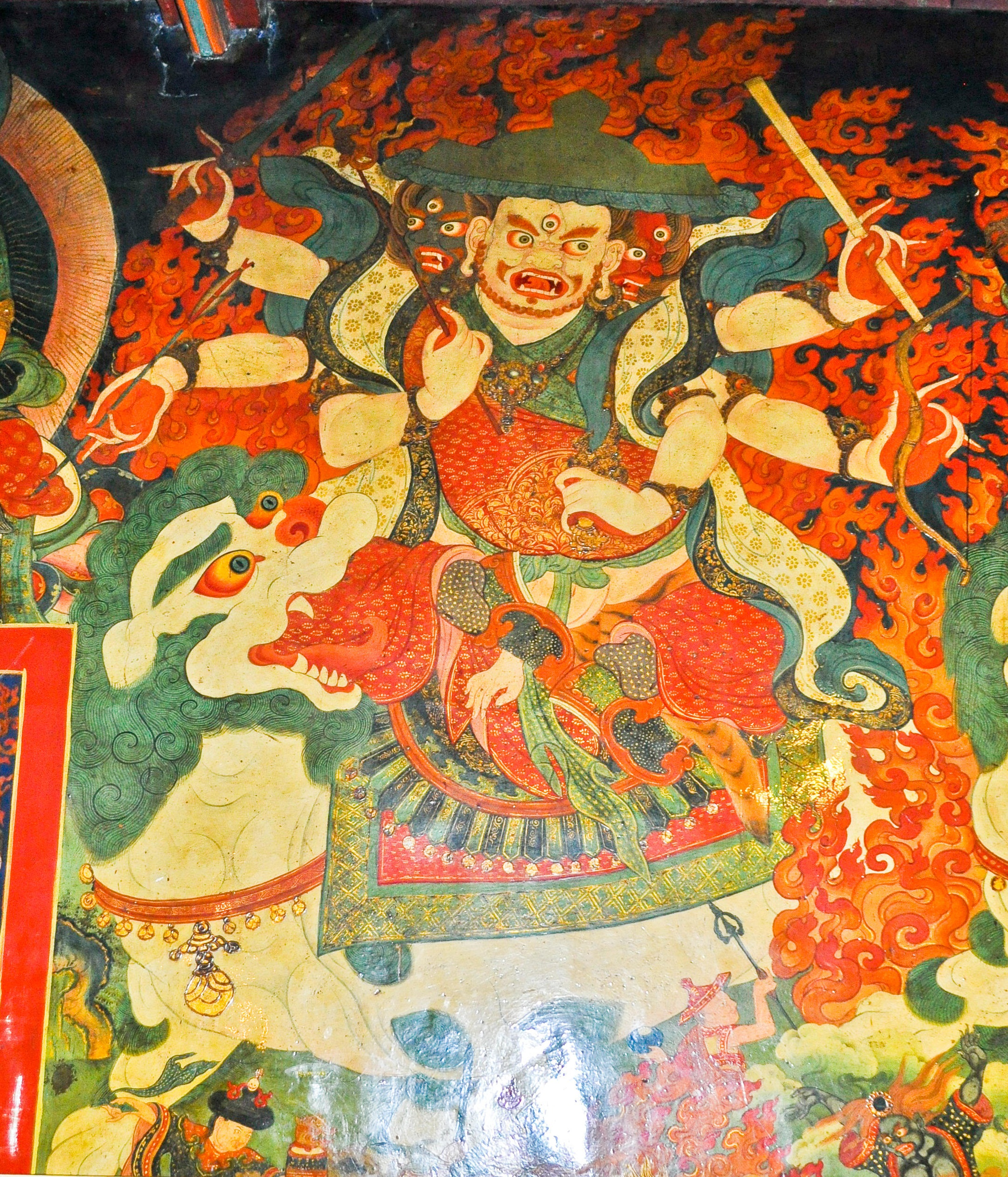
Mural of Pehar in the assembly hall of Nechung Monastery.

According to Tibetan Buddhist myth, Gyalpo Pehar (Tibetan: རྒྱལ་པོ་དཔེ་ཧར་, Wylie: rgyal po dpe har] [also spelt: pe kar & dpe dkar) is the chief spirit belonging to the gyalpo class. When Padmasambhava arrived in Tibet in the eighth century, he subdued all gyalpo spirits and put them under control of Gyalpo Pehar, who promised not to harm any sentient beings and was made the chief guardian spirit of the Samye Temple built at that time. Some Tibetans believe that the protector of Samye sometimes enters the body of a medium (called the "Dharma Lord of Samye") and acts as an oracle.

== Nechung Gyalpo ==
The Great Dharma King (rgyal chen) Nechung Dorje Drakden (rdo rje grags ldan) or Nechung Chokyong (chos skyong) is considered to be the chief minister of Gyalpo Pehar or the same as the activity aspect of Gyalpo Pehar. It is the spirit of this deity which possesses the Nechung Oracle or State Oracle of Tibet.

== Sources ==
- Samuel, Geoffrey (1995). Civilized Shamans: Buddhism in Tibetan Societies. Smithsonian Institution Press. p. 725. ISBN 1-56098-620-4.
- Tashi, Kelzang (2023). World of Worldly Gods: The Persistence and Transformation of Shamanic Bon in Buddhist Bhutan. Oxford University Press. ISBN 9780197669860.
- Beyer, Stephan (1978). The cult of Tārā: Magic and ritual in Tibet. University of California Press. p. 542. ISBN 0-520-03635-2. ISBN 9780520036352.
- Dorje, Gyurme; Sangye Gyatso; Lochen Dharmasri (2001), White Beryl: Tibetan Elemental Divination Paintings, London: John Eskenazi, ISBN 0-9539941-0-4
- Gyatso, Geshe Kelsang (1997). Heart Jewel: The Essential Practices of Kadampa Buddhism (2 ed.). Tharpa Publications. ISBN 978-0-948006-56-2.

Kalsang, Ladrang (1996). The Guardian Deities of Tibet. Pema Thinley (trans.) (2 ed.). Dharamsala: Little Lhasa Publications.

- Lopez, Donald S. (Jr.) (1998). Elaborations on Emptiness: Uses of the Heart Sutra. Princeton University Press. ISBN 0-691-00188-X. ISBN 9780691001883.
- Nebesky-Wojkowitz, René de (1956). Oracles and demons of Tibet: the cult and iconography of the Tibetan protective deities. The Hauge: Mouton. ISBN 81-7303-039-1. ISBN 9788173030390 (reprints).
- Nebesky-Wojkowitz, René de (1976). Christoph von Fürer-Haimendorf (ed.). Tibetan religious dances: Tibetan text and annotated translation of the ʼChams yig. The Hauge: Mouton. ISBN 90-279-7621-X. ISBN 9789027976215.
