= Georges Dreyfus =

Swiss-born academic

Personal life
- Born: 1950 (age 75–76) Switzerland
- Occupation: Professor of Religion

Religious life
- Religion: Buddhism

Senior posting
- Based in: Williams College

Georges B.J. Dreyfus (born 1950) is an academic in the fields of Tibetology and Buddhology, with a particular interest in Indian Buddhist philosophy. In 1985 he was the first Westerner to receive the Geshe Lharampa degree, the highest available within the Tibetan scholastic tradition.

He currently is Jackson professor of religion at Williams College, Massachusetts.

== Selected bibliography ==
=== Books ===
- Dreyfus, Georges B.J. (2003) The Sound of Two Hands Clapping: The Education of a Tibetan Buddhist Monk. University of California Press, Berkeley. ISBN 978-0-520-23260-0
- Dreyfus, Georges B.J (1997) Recognizing Reality: Dharmakīrti's Philosophy and its Tibetan Interpretations. State University of New York Press, Albany. ISBN 0-7914-3098-7

=== Articles ===
- “Self and Subjectivity: a Middle Way Approach” in Self vs. No-Self (Oxford University Press, 2010)
- “Can a Madhyamika be a Skeptic?” in Moonshadows: Conventional Truth in Buddhist Philosophy (Oxford, 2010)
- “Should We Be Afraid? The Return of the Sacred and the Rise of Religious Nationalism.” (2010)
- “Philosophical Issues, Asian Perspectives: Indian Theories of the Mind” in Cambridge Handbook of Consciousness, 2007
- “Emotional Pathologies and their Remedies: An Abhidharmic View,” in The Dalai Lama at MIT, 2007
