= Robert Bleichsteiner =

Austrian ethnologist

Robert Bleichsteiner (6 January 1891 – 10 April 1954) was an Austrian ethnologist.

== Life ==
Bleichsteiner was born in Mariahilf and attended the local grammar school from 1901 to 1909. He went on to study history, geography, ethnography and Oriental languages at the University of Vienna. He was awarded his doctorate in 1914 and became librarian of the Research Institute for East and Orient, becoming a full member in 1917. In 1922 Bleichsteiner habilitated at the University of Caucasian languages. From 1921 he started worked as a volunteer in the ethnographic department of the Natural History Museum, now the Museum of Ethnology, Vienna, being appointed scientific officer in 1926 supervising the Asia Unit. In 1929 he joined Otto Neurath of the Gesellschafts- und Wirtschaftsmuseum in the production of Gesellschaft und Wirtschaft (1930).

After the Second World War he became director of the museum in 1945 and an associate professor in 1947. After his death Bleichsteiner was buried in the Stadlauer cemetery. In 1957 the Bleichsteinerstraße in Vienna-Favoriten (the 10th district) was named after him.

He married Alice in 1939.

As an ethnologist Bleichsteiner developed a scientific approach to Central Asia, Siberia and the Caucasus including the languages of these regions. Much of his work was around Georgia and the Georgian language translating Georgian literature into German.

== Works ==
- Iranische Entsprechungen zu Frau Holle und Baba Jaga; in: Mitra - Monatsschrift für vergleichende Mythenforschung. Erster Jahrgang. 65–71. Vienna 1914
- Bericht über meinen Aufenthalt im k.u.k. Kriegsgefangenenlager Eger (15. Mai bis 25. Juni 1917); in: Berichte des Forschungsinstituts für Osten und Orient. Bd. 1. 81–86. Vienna 1917
- Kaukasische Forschungen im k.u.k. Kriegsgefangenenlager Eger, in: Berichte des Forschungsinstituts für Osten und Orient. Bd. 1. 86–103. Vienna 1917
- Die Alanen; in: Berichte des Forschungsinstituts für Osten und Orient. Bd. 2. 4–16. Vienna 1918
- Eine georgische Ballade von Amiran; in: Berichte des Forschungsinstituts für Osten und Orient. Bd. 2. 148–172. Vienna 1918
- Überblick über kaukasische Völker und Sprachen; in: Berichte des Forschungsinstituts für Osten und Orient. Bd. 2. 66–85. Vienna 1918
- Kaukasische Forschungen 1. Teil. Georgische und Mingrelische Texte. Vienna 1919
- Zum Protochattischen; in: Berichte des Forschungsinstitutes für Osten und Orient. Bd. 3. 102–106. Vienna 1923
- Alabi, ein georgisches Längenmaß; in: Mitteilungen der Anthropologischen Gesellschaft in Wien. Bd. 54. Sitzungsberichte 9–10. Vienna 1924
- Die Subaräer des Alten Orients im Lichte der Japhetitenforschung - Festschrift P.M. Schmidt. Vienna 1928
- Die gelbe Kirche. Mysterien der buddhistischen Klöster in Indien, Tibet, Mongolei und China. Belf, Vienna 1936
- Die kaukasische Sprachgruppe; in: Anthropos 32. St. Gabriel, Mödling 1937
- Daniel Conkhadze: Die Burg von Surami. Siebenberg-Verlag, Vienna 1940 (Übersetzung: Robert Bleichsteiner)
- Der Mann im Pantherfell; in Asien-Berichte. Heft 5. 16–24. Vienna 1940
- Wörterbuch der heutigen mongolische Sprache. Mit kurzem Abriß der Grammatik und ausgewählten Sprachproben. Siebenberg-Verlag, Vienna 1941 (with Walther Heissig)
- Heldenlieder der Daghestanvölker; in: Asien-Berichte. Heft 13/14. 9-22. Vienna 1942
- Der Entdecker der Beringstrasse; in: Die Brücke. Bd. 1. Heft 12. 14–19. Vienna 1946
- Der grosse georgische Dichter Nikolos Barataschwili; in: Die Brücke. Bd. 1. Heft 6/7. 56–59. Vienna 1946
- Neue georgische Dichter. Amandus-Edition, Vienna 1947
- Die Literatur Georgiens; in: Die Brücke. Bd. 3. Heft 10/11. 69–71. Vienna 1948
- Die Völker der Sowjetunion - Eine Übersicht; in: Die Brücke. Bd. 3. Heft 1. 5–10. Vienna 1948
- Das Volk der Georgier. Mit anschließender Übersetzung von "Herbstmorgen in Kachetien" von Simon Tschikowani; in: Die Brücke. Bd. 4. Heft 9. 13–16. Vienna 1949
- Filme des Sowjet-Ostens; in: Die Brücke. Bd. 4. Heft 4. 47–52. Vienna 1949
- Georgien gestern und heute. Eine Fahrt hinter den Kaukasus. Globus-Verlag, Vienna 1950
- Vier Tage Sowjetasien; in: Die Brücke. Bd. 5. Heft 5. 9–11. Vienna 1950
- Perchtengestalten in Mittelasien; in: Archiv für Völkerkunde. Bd. 8. 58–75. Vienna 1953
- Hugo Adolf Bernatzik (Hg.): Die neue große Völkerkunde. Völker und Kulturen der Erde in Wort und Bild Bd. 2 Asien. Australien. Herkul, Frankfurt am Main 1954
- Hufschläge am Himmel. Regensburg 1990
