= Pehar Gyalpo =

Spirit in Tibetan Buddhist mythology

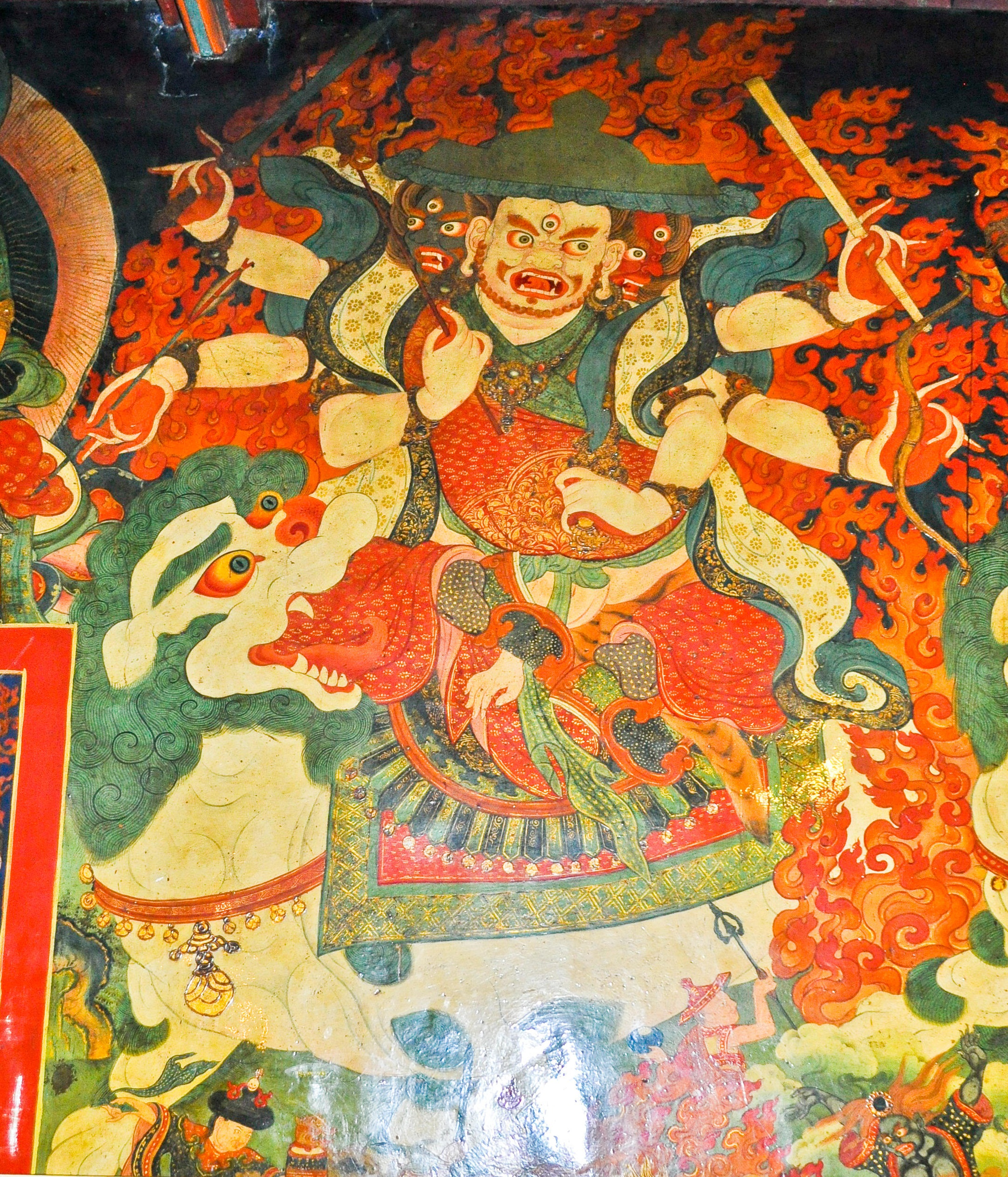
Mural of Pehar in the assembly hall of Nechung Monastery.

According to Tibetan Buddhist myth, Gyalpo Pehar (Tibetan: རྒྱལ་པོ་དཔེ་ཧར, Wylie: rgyal po dpe har [also spelt: pe kar & dpe dkar]) is a spirit belonging to the gyalpo class. When Padmasambhava arrived in Tibet in the eighth century, he subdued all gyalpo spirits and put them under control of Gyalpo Pehar, who promised not to harm any sentient beings and was made the chief guardian spirit of Samye during the reign of Trisong Deutsen. Pehar is the leader of a band of five gyalpo spirits and would later become the protector deity of Nechung Monastery in the 17th century under the auspices of the Fifth Dalai Lama.

After the fall of the Western Xia, the influx of Tangut refugees into Tibet led to the adoption of Pehar into Tibetan Buddhism, eventually in the important role as the state oracle, the Nechung Oracle.

== Protectors of Samye Monastery ==
According to tradition, Padmasambhava enthroned Pekar as the chief protector of Samye, the first monastery in Tibet. A temple within the Samye complex is therefore known as Pekar lha khang (Pekar Temple) or Pekar gling. Pekar served as protector of Samye for 700 years until, according to legend, he moved to Nechung (Tibetan: gnas chung), near Drepung Monastery in central Tibet, during the time of the Fifth Dalai Lama. The deity Tsiu Marpo succeeded him as protector of Samye.
