= René de Nebesky-Wojkowitz =

Czech ethnologist and Tibetologist

- Born: 29 June 1923; Velké Hoštice, Czechoslovakia
- Died: 9 July 1959 (aged 36); Vienna, Austria
- Other name: René Mario von Nebesky-Wojkowitz

Academic background
- Influences: Robert Bleichsteiner, Giuseppe Tucci, Joseph Rock, Prince Peter of Greece and Denmark

Academic work
- Main interests: Tibetan popular religion, Tibetan protector deities, Lepcha culture
- Notable works: Oracles and Demons of Tibet, Tibetan Religious Dances
- Notable ideas: Compiled an exhaustive catalog of Tibetan protective divinities and spirits
- Influenced: Samten Karmay, Amy Heller, Anne-Marie Blondeau, Françoise Pommaret, Todd Allen Gibson, Richard J. Kohn, Hildegard Diemberger, P. Christiaan Klieger.

René de Nebesky-Wojkowitz (29 June 1923 – 9 July 1959) was a Czech ethnologist and Tibetologist. He is mostly known for his 1956 publication Oracles and Demons of Tibet, which was the first detailed study of Tibetan deity cults.

== Biography ==
René Mario de Nebesky-Wojkowitz was born in Velké Hoštice in Czechoslovakia on 29 June 1923. After completing his secondary education in Litoměřice and Prague, he devoted himself to the study of Central Asian ethnology, Tibetan, and Mongolian at the universities of Berlin and Vienna. It was especially the teachings of the late Robert Bleichsteiner at the University of Vienna that encouraged him to specialize in Tibetan studies. Before the defense of his doctoral thesis (see Bibliography, no. 3) on 3 November 1949, he published two articles on the Bön religion and the state oracle. From November 1949 to July 1950, he continued his studies in Italy under the direction of Giuseppe Tucci and Joseph Rock, as well as in London at the School of Oriental and African Studies and the London School of Economics.

In August 1950, Nebesky-Wojkowitz set off for Kalimpong and did not return to Europe until February 1953 (nos. 16, 18). His long stay there gave him access to many texts on protector deities and allowed him to benefit from the council of Tibetan scholars who sought refuge during the Chinese incursion. One can find a vivid description of events at that time in a book he intended for non-specialists (no. 20). Nebesky-Wojkowitz published the results of his research in several articles, and especially in his most important work, Oracles and Demons of Tibet: The Cult and Iconography of the Tibetan Protective Deities (no. 22). This voluminous 666-page book is widely considered a foundational study of Tibetan popular religion and deity cults, making it an indispensable compendium for all those who deal with protector deities. Nebesky-Wojkowitz also made several excursions among the Lepcha of Sikkim (nos. 7, 10, 14, 15). In 1954 he spent five months in Leiden identifying the collection of Lepcha manuscripts at the National Museum of Ethnology, where he had already made a list of the titles of Tibetan xylographs and manuscripts during a seven-month stay in 1953.

René de Nebesky-Wojkowitz visited Kalimpong and Sikkim a second time in the last months of 1956 before going to Nepal to look for a new site of exploration (no. 23). In 1958–1959 he visited Nepal again and stayed there for three months. He collected a considerable amount of material as well as 400 objects for the Museum of Ethnology in Vienna, where they remain today. In 1958 he became a "wissenschaftlicher Beamter" at the Museum of Ethnology. At the start of 1958 he was diagnosed with pneumonia, the effects of which were felt during his third expedition to the Himalayas in 1958–1959. The travels that he undertook in Nepal became too demanding on his health and, upon his return to Vienna, he died at the age of 36 on 9 July 1959 after a brief illness.

== Cause(s) of death ==
According to de Jong, René de Nebesky-Wojkowitz died of pneumonia. However, his cause of death has been almost completely eclipsed by how young he was when he succumbed. Because of this, an urban legend of sorts has come to surround Nebesky-Wojkowitz's death, with many members of the Tibetan Buddhist community believing that his death was actually brought on by the wrath of the very protector deities he studied so assiduously. In his critique of Tibetan shamanism, scholar Zeff Bjerken describes his own personal experience with this widespread belief:

[Nebesky-Wojkowitz’s] sudden untimely death, shortly after the...completion [of Oracles and Demons of Tibet], was thought to have been brought about by Tibet’s protective deities, who were avenging his efforts to reveal their secrets and magic power. At the Library of Tibetan Works and Archives in Dharamsala, when I tried to check out Nebesky-Wojkowitz’s text for my research, I discovered that it was not on the shelf with most other books but kept separate under lock and key. Only after offering the Tibetan librarian my American passport as collateral was I permitted access to the work, although not before being warned of its dangerous content.

Among scholars of Tibetan religions, as well as outside observers, opinions vary, with some taking this belief seriously and others not. Two decades prior to Bjerken’s account, John Blofeld, a popular British writer on Eastern religions, made the following morbidly droll statement: "Tibetans were not surprised when the distinguished author of Oracles and Demons of Tibet came to an untimely end soon after completing that monumental but dullish book. The subject of Guardians is one on which nothing detailed should be said; to write at length about demons is always held to be unwise; but his ultimate crime was to make them seem boring!" This latter contention is, at times, still spoken of in jest among Tibetan specialists today.

== Bibliography ==
1. "Die tibetische Bön-Religion," Archiv für Völkerkunde 2 (1947), pp. 26–68.
2. "Das tibetische Staatsorakel," Archiv für Völkerkunde 3 (1948), pp. 136–155.
3. "Schriftwesen, Papierherstellung und Buchdruck bei den Tibetern" (Vienna, 1949; unpublished dissertation).
4. "Einige tibetische Werke über Grammatik und Poetik," Archiv für Völkerkunde 4 (1949), pp. 154–159.
5. "Ein Beitrag zur tibetischen Ikonographie: mGon po phyag drug und seine Begleiter," Archiv für Völkerkunde 5 (1950), pp. 138–158.
6. "The Tibetan Kagyupa Sect," Stepping-Stones 1[8], pp. 185–187.
7. (with Geoffrey Gorer) "The Use of the Thread-Crosses in Lepcha Lamaist Ceremonies," The Eastern Anthropologist 4[2] (1950–1951), pp. 65–87.
8. "A Contribution to Mahāyāna Iconography," Stepping-Stones 2[3] (1951), pp. 77–82.
9. "Some Recent Publications on Tibet," Stepping-Stones 2[8], pp. 1–10.
10. "Ancient Funeral Ceremonies of the Lepchas," The Eastern Anthropologist 5[1] (1951–1952), pp. 27–40.
11. "A Tibetan Protective Deity," The Eastern Anthropologist 5[2-3] (1952), pp. 87–95.
12. "Prehistoric Beads from Tibet," Man 52 (1952), art. 183, pp. 131–132.
13. "Tibetan Drum Divination, ‘Ngamo’," Ethnos 17 (1952), pp. 149–157.
14. "Hochzeitslieder der Lepchas," Asiatische Studien 6[1-4] (1952), pp. 30–40.
15. "Die Legende vom Turmbau der Lepcha," Anthropos 48 (1953), pp. 889–897.
16. "Neuerwerbungen aus Sikkim und Tibet," Archiv für Völkerkunde 8 (1953), pp. 269–272.
17. "Hunting and Fishing among the Lepchas," Ethnos 18 (1953), pp. 21–30.
18. "A Report on Ethnographical Research in the Sikkim Himalayas 1950–1953," Wiener Völkerkundliche Mitteilungen 2[1] (1954), pp. 33–38.
19. Review of S. Hummel, Geschichte der tibetischen Kunst, Leipzig, 1953 – Asiatische Studien 9 (1955), pp. 139–141.
20. Wo die Berge Götter sind. Drei Jahre bei unerforschten Völkern des Himalaya (Stuttgart, 1955); Dutch translation: Bergen, Goden, Magiërs, Baarn, 1956; English translation: Where the Gods are Mountains: Three Years among the People of the Himalayas, London, 1956, New York, 1957; French translation: Les montagnes où naissent les dieux, Paris, 1957.
21. "Robert Bleichsteiner †," WZKM 52 (1953–1955), pp. 269–271.
22. Der Kult und die Ikonographie der tibetischen Schutzgottheiten / The Cult and Iconography of the Tibetan Protective Deities (Habilitation; Vienna, 1955); Oracles and Demons of Tibet: The Cult and Iconography of the Tibetan Protective Deities (The Hague: Mouton, 1956); Chinese translation Xīzàng de shénlíng hé guǐguài 西藏的神灵和鬼怪 (Lhasa, Xīzàng rénmín chūbǎnshè 西藏人民出版社, 1993), ISBN 7-223-00456-8.
23. "Ergebnisse der 2. Forschungsreise nach Nepal und Sikkim 1956–1957," Wiener Völkerkundliche Mitteilungen 4[2] (1956), pp. 213–216.
24. Review of P. Cyrill von Korvin-Krasinski, Die Tibetische Medizinphilosophie: Der Mensch Als Mikrokosmos, Zurich, 1953 – American Anthropologist 58[5] (October 1956), pp. 936–938.
25. "Tibetan Blockprints and Manuscripts in Possession of the Museum of Ethnology in Vienna," Archiv für Völkerkunde 13 (1958), pp. 174–209.
26. Review of D. L. Snellgrove, Buddhist Himālaya, Oxford, 1957 – OLZ 54 (1959), pp. 530–532.
27. Tibetan Religious Dances: Tibetan Text and Annotated Translation of the ’chams yig (The Hague/Paris: Mouton, 1976); published posthumously by Christoph von Fürer-Haimendorf, with an appendix by Walter Graf, ISBN 90-279-7621-X.
