= Amitabha Buddhist Centre =

Buddhist institution in Singapore

- Amitabha Buddhist Centre

Religion
- Affiliation: Tibetan Buddhism
- Deity: Dalai Lama
- Leadership: Khen Rinpoche Geshe Chonyi

Location
- Location: Geylang, Singapore
- Country: Singapore

Architecture
- Founder: Lama Yeshe, Lama Zopa Rinpoche
- Established: 1985

Amitabha Buddhist Centre is a Buddhist institution in Geylang, Singapore. It is affiliated with the Foundation for the Preservation of the Mahayana Tradition (FPMT), an international non-profit organisation, founded by Lama Thubten Yeshe.

== Origins ==
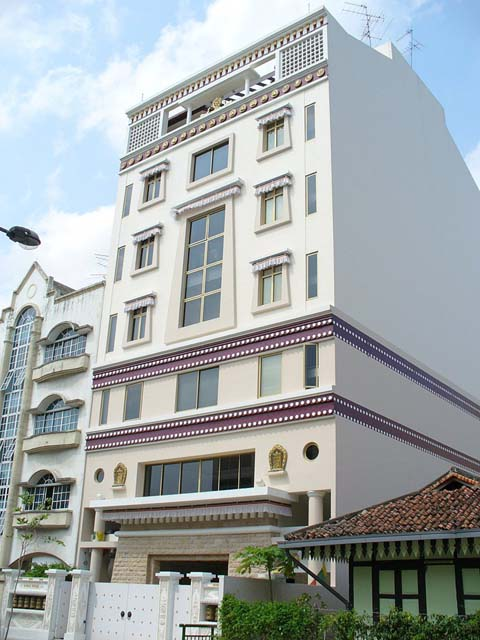
Current home of The Amitabha Buddhist Centre at Lorong 25A

Amitabha Buddhist Centre was founded by Lama Thubten Yeshe when he first visited Singapore with his disciple Thubten Zopa Rinpoche in 1984. After Lama Yeshe died in 1984, Lama Thubten Zopa Rinpoche became its Spiritual Director. The Singapore centre was finally realised in 1985, but had no permanent base. Its followers met in various venues such as Dharma Cakra Society and Cheng Beng Buddhist Society.

In 1987, Lama Zopa sent Venerable Thubten Chodron, an American Buddhist nun to Singapore as its Resident Teacher. Before coming to Singapore, she taught Buddhism and meditation in countries like United States, Europe and Hong Kong. She taught in Singapore for over a year, teaching in schools as well as at different Buddhist societies. She also published several books such as Working with Anger, Open Heart, Clear Mind, Buddhism for Beginners et cetera.

In 1988, the group decided to organise as a Buddhist society under the name "Amitabha Buddhist Centre", and leased a small house at Butterfly Avenue for its activities. Amitabha Buddhist Centre was officially registered in January 1989. In 2000, ABC began to raise funds for the purchase a permanent home at Lorong 15 Geylang. In 2004, they began to build a new seven-storey Tibetan-style structure at nearby Lorong 25A. It was completed in mid-2006.

=== Visits from Tulkus ===
On 26 May 1991, Tulku Tenzin Ösel Rinpoche, a 6-year old Spanish boy, visited Singapore to join members of Amitabha Buddhist Centre for Vesak celebrations. When he was seven months old, this boy had appeared in a dream of a close disciple of Lama Yeshe. The disciple sought him out, and the boy was later officially confirmed as the reincarnation of Lama Yeshe by the Dalai Lama. The boy's story is the subject of Reincarnation: The Boy Lama by Vicki Mackenzie.

On 16 April 2007, 4-year old Tulku Tenzin Phuntsok Rinpoche, dubbed the "Little Lama" by devotees, visited Singapore and Amitabha Buddhist Centre. More than 10,000 people from all walks of life, including some Christians and Hindus, sought blessings from Phuntsok Rinpoche. In December 2005, he was confirmed by the Dalai Lama to be the reincarnation of Geshe Lama Konchog.

=== Present day ===
The current resident teacher at Amitabha Buddhist Centre is Khen Rinpoche Geshe Chonyi, and the centre bears an affiliation with the Foundation for the Preservation of the Mahayana Tradition (FPMT).

== See also ==
- Buddhism in Singapore

== Bibliography ==
- Ong, Y.D. (2005). Buddhism in Singapore—A Short Narrative History. Singapore: Skylark Publications. ISBN 978-981-05-2740-2.
- Farrer-Halls, Gill (1998). The World of the Dalai Lama. Illinois: Godsfield Press. ISBN 978-0-8356-0768-1.
- Epstein, Ronald B. (2003). Buddhism A to Z. California: Buddhist Text Translation Society. ISBN 978-0-88139-353-8.
- Zopa, Lama (2005). Helping You Live Life Meaningfully. Singapore: Amitabha Buddhist Centre (Free distribution book).
- MacKenzie, Vicki (1996). Reincarnation: The Boy Lama. Wisdom Publications. ISBN 978-0-86171-108-6.
- MacKenzie, Vicki (1997). Born in the West: The Reincarnation Masters. HarperCollins. ISBN 978-0-7225-3443-4.
