= Robina Courtin =

Australian Buddhist nun

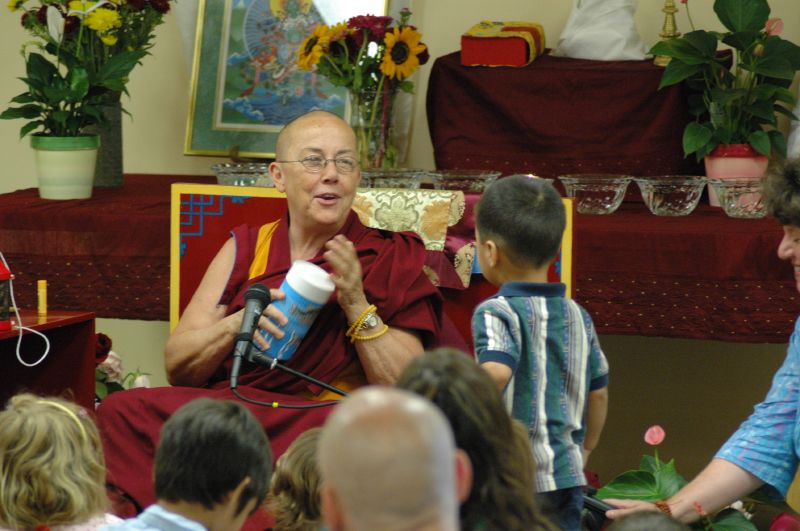
- Robina Courtin in 2007

Personal life
- Born: 20 December 1944 (age 81) Melbourne, Australia
- Occupation: Tibetan Buddhist nun
- Website: www.robinacourtin.com

Religious life
- Religion: Tibetan Buddhism
- School: Gelugpa

Robina Courtin (born 20 December 1944, in Melbourne, Australia) is a Buddhist nun in the Tibetan Buddhist Gelugpa tradition and lineage of Lama Thubten Yeshe and Lama Zopa Rinpoche. In 1996 she founded the Liberation Prison Project, which she ran until 2009.

== Biography ==
Courtin was raised Catholic, and in her youth was interested in becoming a Carmelite nun. In her young adulthood, she trained as a classical singer while living in London during the late 1960s. She became a feminist activist and worked on behalf of prisoners' rights in the early 1970s. In 1972 she moved back to Melbourne. Courtin began studying martial arts in 1974, living in New York City and, again, back in Melbourne. In 1976, she took a Buddhist course taught by Lama Yeshe and Lama Zopa in Queensland.

In 1978 Courtin ordained at Tushita Meditation Centre in Dharamsala. She was editorial director of Wisdom Publications until 1987 and editor of Mandala until 2000. She left Mandala to teach and to develop Liberation Prison Project.

Robina Courtin's work has been featured in two documentary films, Christine Lundberg's On the Road Home (1998) and Amiel Courtin–Wilson's Chasing Buddha (2000), and in Vicki Mackenzie's book Why Buddhism? (2003). Her nephew's film, Chasing Buddha, documents Courtin's life and her work with death row inmates in the Kentucky State Penitentiary. In 2000, the film was nominated for best direction in a documentary by the Australian Film Institute.

In 2001, Courtin created Chasing Buddha Pilgrimage, which lead pilgrimages to Buddhist holy sites in India, Nepal, and Tibet to raise money for the Liberation Prison Project an association engaged for the Tibetan cause.

== Books edited ==
- Zopa, Thubten (2007). Courtin, Robina; Finnegan, Diana; Bernard, Michelle (eds.). Dear Lama Zopa: Radical Solutions for Transforming Problems into Happiness. Wisdom Publications. ISBN 978-0-86171-289-2.
- McDonald, Kathleen (2006). Courtin, Robina (ed.). How to Meditate: A Practical Guide. Wisdom Publications. ISBN 0-86171-341-9.
- Yeshe, Lama Thubten (2003). Courtin, Robina (ed.). Becoming the Compassion Buddha: Tantric Mahamudra for Everyday Life. Wisdom Publications. ISBN 0-86171-343-5.
- Yeshe, Lama Thubten (1998). Courtin, Robina; Cameron, Alisa (eds.). The Bliss of Inner Fire: Heart Practice of the Six Yogas of Naropa. Wisdom Publications. ISBN 0-86171-136-X.
- Rinpoche, Lama Zopa (1993). Courtin, Robina; Cameron, Alisa (eds.). Transforming Problems into Happiness. Wisdom Publications. ISBN 0-86171-038-X.
