= Thubten =

Thubten may refer to:

- Thubten Chökyi Dorje, 5th Dzogchen Rinpoche (1872–1935), the 5th Dzogchen Rinpoche of Tibet in the Nyingma sect of Tibetan Buddhism
- Thubten Chodron, an American Tibetan Buddhist nun and a central figure in reinstating the Bhikshuni
- Thubten Choekyi Nyima, 9th Panchen Lama (1883–1937), the 9th Panchen Lama of Tibet
- Thubten Gyatso (Australian monk), one of the first Westerners to become a monk in the Gelug school of Tibetan Buddhism
- Thubten Gyatso (NKT), a 'Gen-la' and Resident Teacher of Madhyamaka Centre (Pocklington, York)
- Thubten Jigme Norbu (1922–2008), a Tibetan lama, writer, civil rights activist and professor of Tibetan studies
- Thubten Yeshe (1935–1984), a Tibetan lama who, while exiled in Nepal, co-founded Kopan Monastery
- Thubten Zopa Rinpoche (born 1946), a lama from Thami, a village in the Khumbu region of Nepal

== See also ==
- Thubten Dhargye Ling, an American Tibetan Buddhist center founded by Geshe Gyeltsen in 1978
- Thubten Shedrup Ling, the first Tibetan Buddhist monastery in Australia
