= Nalanda Monastery (France) =

Coordinates: 43.6901°N 1.8491°E

Nalanda Monastery (Fr: le monastère Nalanda, f. 1981) is the first Western monastery of the Foundation for the Preservation of the Mahayana Tradition (FPMT), an international network of Gelugpa dharma centers. Named for Nalanda Monastery in ancient India, the French institution is located near Lavaur, about forty kilometers from Toulouse, and not far from another FPMT center, the Institut Vajra Yogini.

== History ==
The site was purchased by Elizabeth Drukier, then director of the Institut Vajra Yogini, with the intention of using it as the European headquarters of the International Mahayana Institute (IMI), a group of Western monks following FPMT co-founders Lama Yeshe and Lama Zopa. The monastery opened in a converted farmhouse, with Geshe Jampa Tegchog as its first abbot (served 1981-1994, afterwards abbot of Sera Je) and Ven. Adrian Feldman as its first director. Since 2000, its abbot has been Geshe Losang Jamphel.

== Activities ==
Nalanda offers the FPMT Basic Program and (from 2013) FPMT Masters Program as well as various pujas (worship ceremonies) and one-off events. The current Abbott is Geshe Losang Jamphel, and the second teacher is Geshe Jamphel Gyaltsen.

In 2019, former Nalanda teacher Geshe Tashi Tsering was awarded the British Empire Medal (Civil Division) for services to Buddhism in the UK. He taught at Nalanda Monastery for several years before going on to become the guiding Tibetan teacher at Jamyang Buddhist Centre in London.
