= Nick Ribush =

Nicholas Ribush was among the first Westerners to be ordained as a monk in the Tibetan Buddhist tradition. A founder of Wisdom Publications, Ribush is today the director of the Lama Yeshe Wisdom Archive, a collection of thousands of teachings by Lama Yeshe and Lama Zopa Rinpoche, who pioneered the teaching of Tibetan Buddhism in the West.

After graduating from Melbourne University Medical School in 1964, Ribush first encountered Buddhism at Kopan Monastery in 1972. He was a Gelug monk from 1974 to 1986. In 1975, with Lama Yeshe, he established the international publishing house, Wisdom Publications; in 1977, he established the Tushita Mahayana Meditation Centre, New Delhi; and in 1989, Kurukulla Center, Boston. In 1996 he established the Lama Yeshe Wisdom Archive, Boston, which he now directs.

Ribush was a member of the FPMT board of directors from its inception in 1983 until 2002.

== See also ==
- Gelug
- Thubten Gyatso (Australian monk)
- Tibetan Buddhism
