= Istituto Lama Tzong Khapa =

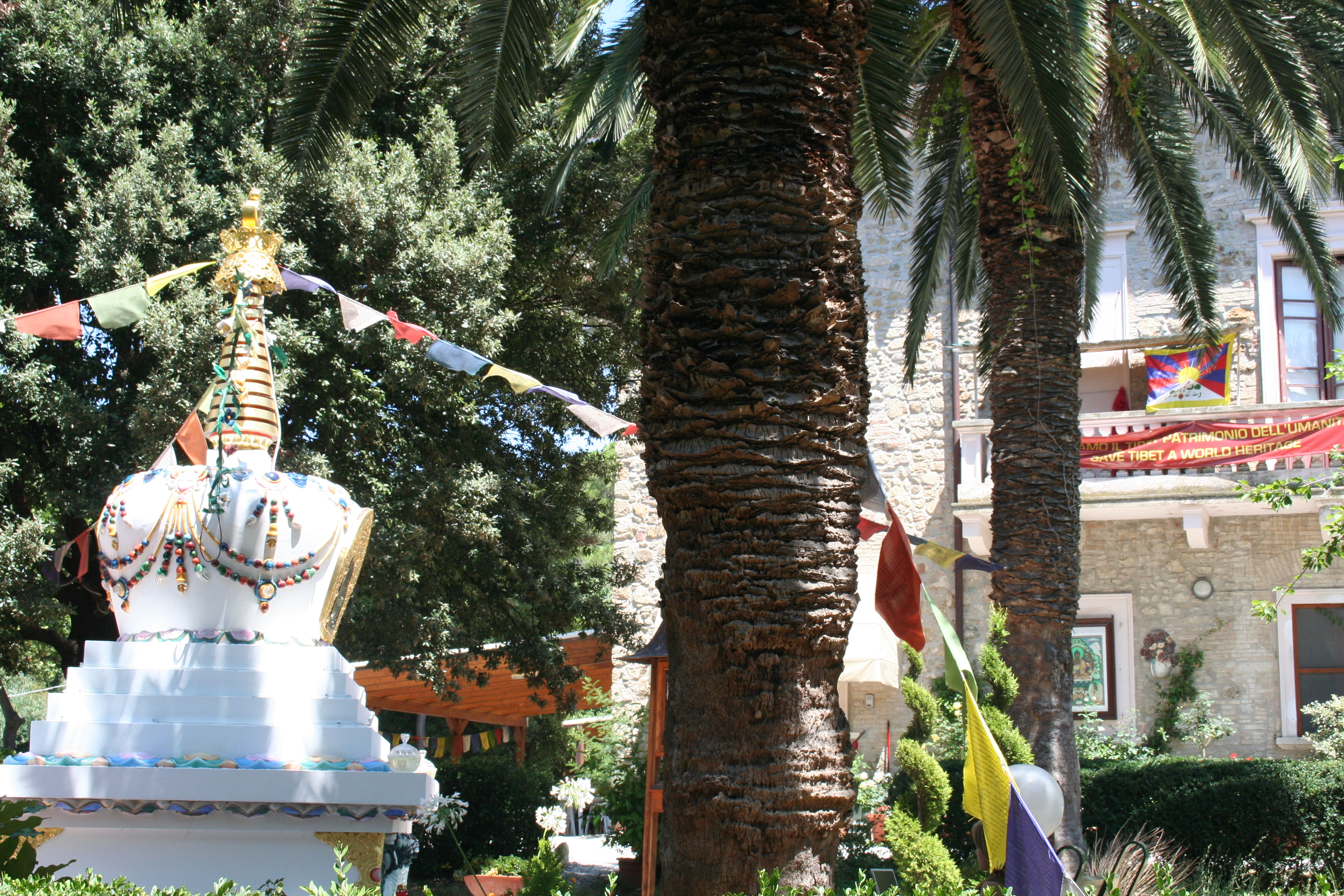
Stupa and entrance of the Istituto Lama Tzong Khapa

The Istituto Lama Tzong Khapa (ILTK) in Pomaia, a village in Tuscany, in Italy (40 km south of Pisa) is a branch of the Foundation for the Preservation of the Mahayana Tradition (FPMT), an international network of Gelugpa dharma centers. It is named for Tsongkhapa, founder of the Gelugpa monastic order of Tibetan Buddhism. The Dalai Lama has taught there on several occasions.

Established in 1977 by the FPMT founders, Lamas Thubten Yeshe and Thubten Zopa Rinpoche, the ILTK offers various courses on Tibetan Buddhism in Italian, English, and (to a lesser extent) several other European languages. Of these, the most noteworthy is a six-year (formerly seven) Masters Program designed for the training of FPMT teachers.

== The Masters Program ==
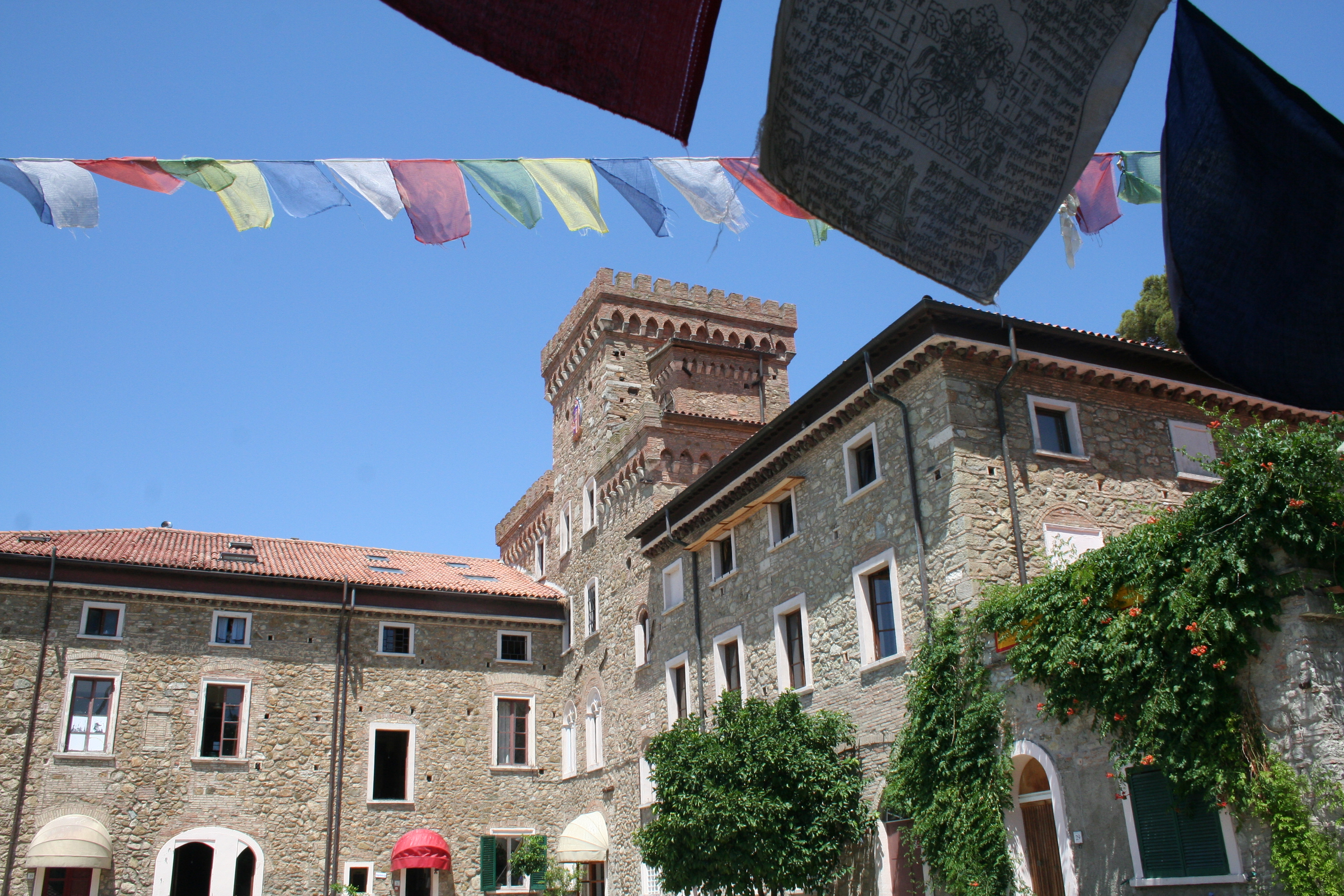
Another view of the ILTK, with Tibetan prayer flags

The first ILTK Masters Program was held between 1998 and 2004. About thirty students finished the course, with others participating in portions of it. A second course began in 2008, with some modifications, and concluded in 2013. Geshe Jampa Gyatso died before it commenced, resulting in the appointment of his junior colleague, Geshe Tenzin Tenphel, as the course teacher. In 2009 Geshe Tenphel resigned from this role, to be succeeded by Khensur Rinpoche Jampa Tegchok. The next ILTK Masters Program is scheduled to begin in 2015, though ILTK will no longer be the sole FPMT centre to offer the Masters Program.

== Other Courses ==
Similar to other FPMT centres, the ILTK also offers short-duration courses such as lamrim. Some of these are modules in sequences such as "Discovering Buddhism" (two years of weekend study) or the FPMT's "Basic Program" (a standardized sequence of seven courses which requires several years to complete).

In addition to Tibetan Buddhist subjects, ILTK also offers "alternative" courses on such subjects as hatha yoga, qigong, Sufism, astrology, aromatherapy, and massage. Psychological counseling services are also available.

== Other activities ==
ILTK has been a member of the Unione Buddhista Italiana (Italian Buddhist Union) since that organization's founding in 1984, and served as its headquarters until 1992 (when the UBI opened offices in Rome). UBI is a lobby group seeking various forms of government recognition for Italian Buddhist institutions.

ILTK hosts regular conferences of the "Mindfulness Project," which is devoted to dialogue between Buddhism and counselling psychology.

Since 1983 ILTK has published an Italian-language newsletter—now a thrice-yearly magazine—entitled Siddhi. It also manages a press, JTK Publications (JTK for "Je Tsong Khapa"), devoted to Italian-language Buddhist books and other material.

== Affiliated Sangha ==
In 1978, Khyabje Song Rinpoche ordained five monks in Pomaia. Their monastery, Tagden Shedrub Dhargye Ling ("Place Where Study and Practice Proliferate Uninterruptedly"), was built during the 1980s under the patronage of Lama Zopa. It was the first Gelugpa monastery in Italy. Two of its monks, Pierro Cerri and Claudio Cipullo, were also among the founders of ILTK.

In 1984, six monks and one nun formed the Italian International Mahayana Institute, a cultural organization. The group (possibly defunct?) had two categories of membership: monastic and lay.

A nunnery, Shenpen Samten Ling ("Place of Concentration Benefiting Others"), opened in 1989 under the patronage of Lama Zopa.

== Books ==
- Cozort, Daniel. "The Making of the Western Lama." In Buddhism in the Modern World (Steven Heine & Charles S. Prebish, eds), Oxford UP: 2003, ch. 9. Cozort discusses the ILTK's Masters Program in the context of the overall educational curricula of the FPMT, which he compares with the traditional system of Sera Je Monastery as well as that another Western organisation, the New Kadampa Tradition.
