= Tara Institute =

Tibetan Buddhist center

- Predecessor: Tara House
- Formation: 1970s
- Founded at: Melbourne
- Purpose: Tibetan Buddhist teaching
- Headquarters: 3 Mavis Ave, Brighton East VIC 3187
- Website: tarainstitute.org.au

Tara Institute is a center in East Brighton, Melbourne which teaches Tibetan Buddhism beliefs. As of March 2020 the lama, Venerable Geshe Doga has been the resident teacher since 1984. The center is a member of the FPMT.

== History ==
Tara House, the forerunner of Tara Institute had its beginnings in Melbourne in 1974 when a small group of people who had attended one of the first Kopan Monastery meditation courses in Nepal began to meet at a house in North Fitzroy. Then in 1976 the group rented an old hotel in Carlton which was named Tara House by Lama Thubten Yeshe. In 1977 the center moved to a rented house in Kew and began to develop a retreat centre at Noojee in 1978. The first resident teacher, Geshe Dawö arrived in 1980 with his translator, Kelsang Tsering.

Following the advice and persuasion of Lama Thubten Yeshe in 1981 to "think big" Tara House bought an old mansion in East St Kilda in 1983. By 1987 this location had become too small and so the current building at Marillac House, which incorporates an historic mansion, was purchased. The centre was then renamed Tara Institute.

== Activities and facilities ==
There is a weekly program of meditation and Buddhist courses plus weekend courses, pujas, special healing courses, social events and activities for children.

The Center has full-time residents as well as providing dormitory accommodation for visitors. It is supported through residency, membership fees, donations and volunteer work. Amongst the facilities are a library and a bookshop.

== See also ==
- Foundation for the Preservation of the Mahayana Tradition
