= Kyabje Choden Rinpoche =

Tibetan Buddhist spiritual leader (1930–2015)

(His Eminence) Chöden Rinpoche
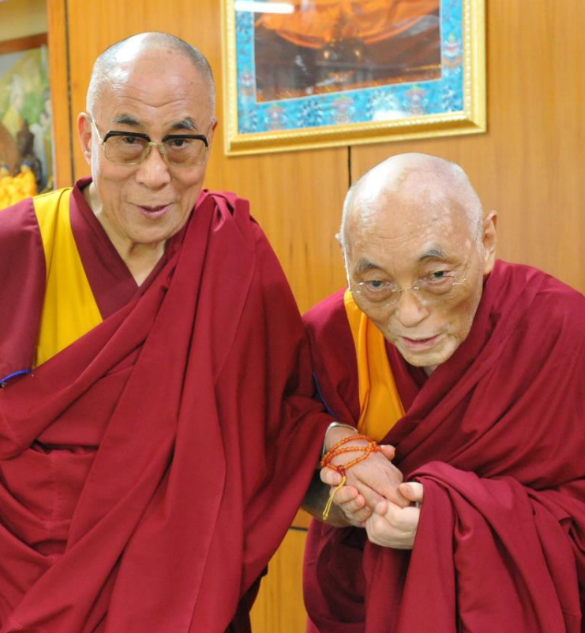
- Chöden Rinpoche with the 14th Dalai Lama
- Title: Rinpoche

Personal life
- Born: Saka Dawa, a.k.a. Losar (Tibetan New Year), i.e. May 31, 1930 C.E. (according to Geshe Gyalten Kunga of Chöden Ladrang, Sera Jé monastery); Rong-bo, Kham, Tibet
- Died: September 11, 2015 C.E. (=26th of the 7th lunar month of the Tibetan year 2142, corresponding to the Female Wood Sheep Year of the 17th Rabjung Calendrical Cycle) Sera Jey monastery, Bylakuppe, south India
- Education: Sera monastery (Sera Jé), Lhopa Khangtsen
- Other name: Chöden Rinpoche

Religious life
- Religion: Tibetan Buddhism
- School: Gelug
- Lineage: Gelug
- Dharma name: Losang Gyalten Jigdrel Wangchuk

Senior posting
- Teacher: The XIVth Dalai Lama; (Pabongkha Rinpoche); (Trijang Rinpoche)
- Based in: Rabten Monastery, Rong-bo, Kham, Tibet
- Predecessor: Chöden Rinpoche Lobsang Tulku (Tibetan: ཆོས་ལྡན་རིན་པོ་ཆེ་བློ་བཟང་སྤྲུལ་སྐུ་, Wylie: chos-ldan rin-po-che blo-bzang sprul-sku) (II)
- Successor: Chöden Rinpoche Tenzin Gyalten (Tibetan: ཆོས་ལྡན་རིན་པོ་ཆེ་བསྟན་འཛིན་རྒྱལ་བསྟན, Wylie: chos-ldan rin-po-che bstan-'dzin rgyal-bstan) (IV)
- Students: Khen Rinpoche Geshe Gyalten Kunga, abbott of Lama Gaun Tashi Rabten Monastery, Pharping, Nepal

Military service
- Website: https://www.awakeningvajrainternational.org; see also https://www.chodenrinpoche.com for Tibetan version; Vietnamese: https://www.chodenrinpochedharma.com

(Kyabje) Choden Rinpoche (Tibetan: སྐྱབས་རྗེ་ཆོས་ལྡན་རིན་པོ་ཆེ, Wylie: (skyabs-rje) chos-ldan rin-po-che; in full, Tibetan: བློ་བཟང་རྒྱལ་བསྟན་འཇིགས་བྲལ་དབང་ཕྱུག, Wylie: blo-bzang rgyal-bstan 'jigs-bral dbang-phyug) (May 31, (Tibetan New Year) 1930 Rong-bo district, Kham, eastern Tibet – September 11, 2015) was a contemporary yogi-scholar of the Gelugpa school of Tibetan Buddhism and a reincarnation (tulku) of the Choden lineage, the historical abbots of Rabten Monastery (Tibetan: རབ་བརྟེན་དགོན་པ, Wylie: (rab-brten dgon-pa) in Rong-bo district, Kham.

The late Choden Rinpoche, Losang Gyalten Jigdrel Wangchuk (lit. "Teaching of the victorious Losang [blo-bzang rgyal-bstan], fearless [jig-bral] sovereign [dbang-phyug]" (Note: Note that while the four individual elements of Choden Rinpoche's Dharma name can be translated with authoritative accuracy when rendered in isolation, the relationship between the individual components is not decidedly settled in the absence of clear case markers. 1) "Losang" (blo-bzang) can both refer to the "clear mind" in the literal sense and to Losang [Drakpa]'s (i.e. Tsongkhapa) as the personal name. 2) "Gyalten" (rgyal-bstan) is an abbreviated form of "rgyal-ba'i bstan-pa", which translates as "teaching of the Victorious One". 3) Jigdrel ('jigs-bral) means "separated from fear" (not to be conflated with the slightly more common name "Jigmé" - "free from fear". 4) "Wangchuk" (dbang-phyuk) means both "sovereign" (as a noun) and "powerful" as an adjective. This accounts for some variation of renditions, especially when translated into foreign languages. For this reason, it is possible to interpret the terms both literally as "Clear mind, teaching of the victorious one, separated from fear, powerful"; at the same time, a more poetic reading might authoritatively opt for something along the lines of "fearless Sovereign [of] the teaching of the victorious Losang [Drakpa]". According to the Tibetan grammatical makeup, either interpretation is permissible.)) has been known amongst his peers and students as "master of the five sciences" (viz. medicine, craftsmanship, logic, grammar and the inner science of Buddhism), as extraordinary scholar of Tibetan Buddhism, yogic practitioner, and for being gentle, kind and compassionate. Kyabje Choden Rinpoche was a lineage-holder of rare and sought-after transmissions of the Tantrayana.

== Family background and early life ==
Choden Rinpoche was born near Rabten Monastery, Rong-bo (Kham) into a "family of (minor) nobility", (euphemistically rendered post-1959 as "family of an official") that consisted of nine sons and five daughters. He was recognized at age three as the third Chöden Tulku, i.e. as reincarnation of the previous Chöden Rinpoche, Losang Chöden (Tibetan: བློ་བཟང་ཆོས་ལྡན་, Wylie: blo-bzang chos-ldan), a locally renowned yogi and abbot of Rong-po monastery who in turn had been one of the candidates for recognition as the 12th Dalai Lama, Trinley Gyatso. According to Geshe Tseten Gelek of Sera Jé—long-time assistant to Kyabje Chöden Rinpoche—Rinpoche's third eldest brother, Geshe Thubten Yarphel (Tibetan: ཐུབ་བསྟན་ཡར་འཕེལ་, Wylie: thub-bstan yar-'phel) was a prolific scholar-practitioner and composed over fifty volumes of commentary on sutra and tantra and rose to local prominence especially as a teacher of the Kālacakra tradition before dying in 1997. The second eldest brother was reportedly "able to recite the Buddhist scriptures without even seeing them". Kyabje Choden Rinpoche himself displayed similar feats of accelerated memorization, supposedly retaining prayers and scriptures with minimal effort and in only a fraction of the time generally required. As a young child, the young reincarnate Lama displayed remarkable inclinations, such giving Dharma teachings in play, and imitating the administration of traditional Tibetan Medicine to other children.

== Education ==
Shortly after his recognition as the reincarnation of Chöden Rinpoche Lobsang Tulku, the previous abbot of Rong-po monastery, his uncle began tutoring the young lama. Kyabje Choden Rinpoche relates about this period:

From the age of 3 to 8, I was tutored by an uncle who lived in a hermitage, and at the age of 8 I entered the local [Rongpo] Rabten Monastery, where I learned all the prayers and rituals. I was 6 years old when I first met the previous Pabongka Rinpoche, and I took many teachings from him at Rabten Monastery. I also took novice ordination from him then. At that time I did not know much about the practice. When I was 10 one ex-abbot of Drepung Loseling taught on the lam-rim and I attended the teachings, and it was around that time that my interest in the practice began.

— Mandala Magazine July–August 2000

The meeting with Pabongkha Rinpoche reportedly left a lasting impression:

Rinpoche was very happy with me and I really admired everything that Rinpoche did: the way he walked, the way he dressed, everything. I felt, "If only I could be like him", because I had such admiration from him.

— Mandala Magazine July–August 2000

When he was 15 years old, the young lama followed Pabongkha's counsel to enrol in Sera monastery and left his native Kham for the regional "college" allotted by geographical provenance, Lhopa Khangtsen, together with his brother, (Geshe) Thubten Yarphel. At Sera monastery, Rinpoche did extremely well, despite well-documented hardships, and relative poverty. Amongst the remarkable feats accomplished by the young aspirant was the memorization of "thousands of pages of philosophical texts, including the entire text Golden Garland of Eloquence by Tsongkhapa, a sprawling twelve-hundred-page commentary on the perfection of wisdom sutras. He consistently topped his class in debate and periodically attended teachings on lamrim and tantra by contemporary luminaries like Pari Rinpoche, Trijang Rinpoche, and Ling Rinpoche." Rinpoche "was in the same class as Geshe Sopa Rinpoche, Geshe Ugyen Tseten and Geshe Legden for two or three years." Although the chief pursuit at Sera monastery was the exoteric curriculum of Buddhist philosophy as transmitted via the (Five) Great Treatises (Tibetan: གཞུང་ཆེ་བ་, Wylie: gzhung che-ba), from 1961 until 1965, Rinpoche "also studied auxiliary subjects like Sanskrit, poetry, and astrology with a private tutor in Lhasa", an abbot from a Sakya monastery.

While enrolled in the Geshe Lharam class,

== Debating partner to the 14th Dalai Lama ==
Choden Rinpoche was chosen to serve as one of two debating-partners hailing from Sera monastery for the occasion of the XIVth Dalai Lama's public Geshe-examinations in 1959 ("Debating with the Dalai Lama".) for the topics of the "Two Truths" (Tibetan: བདེན་པ་གཉིས, Wylie: bden-pa gnyis). Despite an interlude of many years, when reunited in exile, both the Dalai Lama and Kyabje Chöden Rinpoche remembered the episode with fondness and in detail—according to Rinpoche, the Dalai Lama displayed a nimble mind and remarkable acuity during the examinations.

The fourteenth Dalai Lama, in turn recounted:

The first time I noticed Rinpoche was during an audience, in the sunli[…]t room of the Jen-Sel Podrang of Norbulingka, with Sera monks who had travelled a short distance to break the boundary after completing the rains retreat. One detail I remember clearly is how the sunlight dipped from the ceiling, alighting on the top of Rinpoche's head. At that time, I did not know Rinpoche. But I clearly recall how, when the sun touched Rinpoche's head, a bee descended and stayed on his head as well [as] (an auspicious sign)[…] Then I thought, `this is a magnificent lama'

— the fourteenth Dalai Lama, Transcript of the meeting of the Dalai Lama and Kyabje Choden Rinpoche in Delhi, Aug. 29, 2015, as archived by the FPMT

== 1959 and its aftermath: in solitary retreat for 19 years (1965-1985) ==
Observing the restrictive political developments manifesting at the outset of the Cultural Revolution, Choden Rinpoche decided to withdraw from his public activities and the duties of a senior reincarnate Lama and instead to devote his time to extended solitary retreat. His motivation, he explained in early summer of 2000, was to practice the Buddhist meditation sincerely, and to realize, in practice, what he has learned in theory during his studies at Sera monastery:

The main thing I wanted to do was to practice Dharma sincerely, no matter what external factors were arising.

— Choden Rinpoche, The Life of a Hidden Meditator, Mandala Magazine July–August 2000, p. 63

Choden Rinpoche incepted his solitary retreat phase with the practice of "Taking the Essence" (Chulen). This came to be in response to the local administrator's instruction to Rinpoche "if you can practice Dharma without having to rely on other people for food or clothing, then you can practice". Rinpoche described this initial phase in the following manner:

...many people decided that the practice called Taking the Essence — Chulen — (which didn't require any food) was the best option and aimed to live in retreat in mountain hermitages.

To do chulen you need to get instructions, proper instructions. At the beginning I didn't get the instruction, but at last, after requesting so many times, some of us received the instruction and I did the retreat for three months.

I wanted to continue this practice for my whole life. The practice went well and I felt a lot of energy and mindfulness.

— Choden Rinpoche, The Life of a Hidden Meditator, Mandala Magazine July–August 2000, p. 70

Thereafter, Rinpoche, being forced to abort his Chulen practice by dint of governmental changes in policy, began to live in Lhasa until about 1964, "doing the main practices of Guhyasamaja, Yamantaka and Heruka, and giving some teachings where I could."

According to Geshe Gyalten Choden Rinpoche was able to accomplish the feat of completing a retreat of 19 years despite the onset of the Cultural Revolution, lasting from 1965 until 1985 by living in a small room in Rinpoche's cousin's house "without coming out". Choden Rinpoche was able to do so by feigning to be an invalid:

His room had no window, only a small space for ventilation above the door. Rinpoche stayed in one room for eight years, then he went to another room for the remaining eleven years … He didn't take even one step out of those rooms for nineteen years … There was no altar, no text, nothing. He had already finished all the memorization of all the texts and prayers during his years of study at Sera, so he didn't need these things. … So Rinpoche did all the retreats using just his mind; everything was in his mind. But he would never say this himself; he just says he was sleeping, thinking a little about the Dharma. … Until 1980 he didn't talk to anybody, only the person who brought food into his room. No one else even came to his room — if people brought food they'd give it to his family and they'd bring it in.

— Geshe Gyalten (as Ven. Tseten Gelek), Mandala Magazine July–August 2000, p. 66.

Displaying characteristic humility, Rinpoche recounted the period in the following manner

Because I stayed inside like this without ever going out, people said I was doing retreat. But it wasn't proper retreat, with the offerings, ritual things, and so forth. During this time I would think about the various stages of the path to enlightenment, as well as Guhyasamaja, Heruka, Yamantaka, all the generation stage yogas. And when I had time, I would complete the mantra quotas of each deity. In any case, you don't need external things to do Dharma practice. It's all in your heart, your mind. As for realizations: you do not experience the realizations of the three principal aspects of the path, but you do have a little renunciation, and because of that, you are able to stay like that.

— Choden Rinpoche, Mandala Magazine July–August 2000, p. 68.

== 1985: Teaching activity in India begins ==
Rinpoche travelled to India in 1985, where, upon consultation with the fourteenth Dalai Lama, he briefly taught in Nepal before settling down at the Lhopa Khangtsen "regional college" of Sera Jé Monastery in Bylakuppe, South India. Functioning primarily as instructor for philosophical debate, Rinpoche unabatedly persevered in his personal practice and study. During that time,

[m]any people have asked me to compose books, but I don't like to do that. The main purpose of learning poetry, grammar, and astrology is to understand Dharma properly and to put it into practice. I didn't learn it to compose books. When people ask me I say we have so many books---we have enough books. What's lacking is practicing the instructions in the books.

— Choden Rinpoche, The Life of a Hidden Meditator, Mandala Magazine July–August 2000, pp. 68-9

== 1998: Teaching in the West ==
Rinpoche continued to emphasize practice and teaching after taking up teaching activities in the West at the behest of the Dalai Lama and Lama Zopa Rinpoche during the year of 1998. Though Rinpoche was much sought after as a traditional teacher, when the opportunity arose, Rinpoche fulfilled specific requests forwarded by his students to the best of His ability, such as granting ordination or visiting correctional facilities. From 1998 to 2013, Rinpoche dedicated most of the year to touring worldwide in order to impart the Dharma, and consistently returned to Sera monastery at the end of the year to give extensive public teachings to thousands of monks.

== Preservation of the Legacy ==
In 2010, Geshe Gyalten founded Awakening Vajra International (Visit Official website) at the request of his teacher as a network of internationally associated Dharma Centers in order to provide a platform for Kyabje Choden Rinpoche's teaching activities in the West. As of 2015, Awakening Vajra International, under the spiritual direction of Geshe Gyalten is entrusted with the preservation and cultivation of Kyabje Choden Rinpoche's legacy and life achievement. Note that there is also a dedicated Tibetan Language website, as well as a Vietnamese Language web presence associated with AVI.

== Final years and transition ==
Although Kyabje Choden Rinpoche's health was gradually waning from July 2014 C.E. onwards, Rinpoche steadfastly persisted in giving major teachings in Sera Jé monastery, and even attended the great Lam Rim teachings given by the Dalai Lama. A final meeting between the Dalai Lama and Rinpoche was arranged in Delhi on 29 August 2015, on November 3, 2015, the Dalai Lama composed a "Prayer for swift return" (PDF). Despite Rinpoche's severe illness, there was not a single day in Rinpoche's life that he would miss a meditation or recitation commitment, and right until the day of Rinpoche's death, he was engaged with extensive prayers and rituals. Geshe Tenzin Namdak relates in an open letter:

From September 4th to 8th, together with senior geshes and tulkus, Rinpoche engaged in the self-initiations of his main tantric deities: Guhyasamaja, Heruka Chakrasamvara, Yamantaka, Cittamani Tara, and Vajrayogini. Disciples observed that Rinpoche performed the recitations precisely [and] without break. During that time, in accordance with the words of the texts, from the state of single-pointed meditation taking the three bodies into the path, Rinpoche also performed the hand mudras without omission or redundancy. On the 8th, having completed well the rituals of self-initiation, Rinpoche showed the aspect of great contentment and gave his final instructions for the future to his disciple Geshe Gyalten. [These instructions included directions for the pujas and prayers to be done after his passing and in the future, advice for the running of Awakening Vajra Centers, and indications regarding his next incarnation.]

— Geshe Tenzin Namdak, Letter regarding H.E. Choden Rinpoche's Kongdzong

Jangtse Chöje Losang Tenzin Rinpoche presided over Rinpoche's cremation that was supported by a congregation of monks from Gyütö tantric college on September 15 at Lhopa Khangtsen of Sera Jé. On September 19, Gen Thubten Rinchen guided the process of opening the cremation stupa. Rinpoche's close students have captured these final days by way of a succinct audio-visual documentation.

Rinpoche's final words, as transmitted by Geshe Gyalten Kunga and Geshe Tenzin Namdak, were "mainly it is important to remember the kindness of the Buddha and abide in that remembrance", and added a verse from Ārya Nāgārjuna's Five Stages of Guhyasamāja:

Whatever a yogi observes,

He should view it as like an illusion.
Similar to a reflection in a mirror,
A dream, a mirage, a water-bubble,
Or a trick of the eye, so should he see it.

[The Buddha] said that is the main [insight].

— Nāgārjuna, Five Stages of Guhyasamāja

In the final meeting between the fourteenth Dalai Lama and Choden Rinpoche, the Dalai Lama shared his impression that

This life has reached a successful completion. Death is the inevitable end of birth; in that, we are all the same […] Rinpoche should have no regret[s] for his activities he has done while alive. He has made his life deeply meaningful. So, relax with a happy mind. I pray and make similar inner aspirations at all times.

— the fourteenth Dalai Lama, Transcript of the meeting of the Dalai Lama and Kyabje Choden Rinpoche in Delhi, Aug. 29, 2015, as archived by the FPMT

The transition and cremation ceremony, held in Sept. 2015 at Sera Jé Monastery in India has been in a short audio-visual contribution.

== Finding, assessing, and reinstating Rinpoche's reincarnation ==
Immediately after Rinpoche's death, Gyalten Khen Rinpoche inaugurated a search party consisting of ten members, including

- Chökhor Rinpoche Tenzin Chögyal, resident teacher based in New York, NY, USA.
- The 12th Shabdrung Chowang Dragpa Rinpoche, based in Australia.
- Śāntideva Rinpoche, based in Switzerland.
- Geshe Norzang, the seniormost teacher of Gyüto monastery at the time
- Geshe Gelek, resident teacher at the Istituto Lama Tsongkhapa at Pomaia, Italy.
- Geshe Kunzang, director of Ananda Dharma Center, Awakening Vajra International, San José, USA.
- 2 representatives from Tibet
- Representatives from the Lhopa Khangtsen regional college in Sera Jé monastery, Bylakuppe, India

The search party successfully identified Rinpoche's successor, born on Saka Dawa (April 15) 2016 in the state of Orissa, from amongst 24 possible candidates. The candidate was confirmed by His Holiness the 14th Dalai Lama during two meetings with the search party. His Holiness graciously bestowed a name on the young reincarnation, as well as giving the transmission of the Mañjuśrī-mantra for the young reincarnation to practice. The young Rinpoche has been officially into Sera Jé monastery in 2022 as a member of the monastery. On Sept. 27-29, 2023, Rinpoche has been given official recognition as the rightful heir to the previous Chöden Rinpoche by way of the enthronement ceremony held at Sera Lachi, Sera Jé monastery, Lhopa Khangtsen, and Chöden Ladrang, Bylakuppe, India. Note that AVI Nusantara (Indonesia) has documented the young Yangsi's enthronement ceremony in a short contribution.

== Selection of Major Works translated into English ==
- Kyabje Choden Rinpoche (2020), Mastering Meditation: Instructions on Calm Abiding and Mahāmudrā, with a foreword by H.H. the 14th Dalai Lama, translated by Ven. Gelong Tenzin Gache, Wisdom Publications.
- Kyabje Choden Rinpoche (2012), An Offering Cloud of Nectar: A Compilation of Mind Training and Other Subjects, translated by Ian Coghlan and Voula Zarpani, Awakening Vajra International.
- Kyabje Choden Rinpoche (2011), Stairway to the State of Union: A Collection of Teachings on Secret Mantra, translated by Ian Coghlan and Voula Zarpani, Awakening Vajra International.

== Resources for his students ==
Before showing the aspect of dying, Rinpoche advised his students to recite the prayer "Chanting the Names of Manjushri" and other prayers in preparation of his rebirth in a new reincarnation.

Vietnamese students have produced a short Vietnamese language documentary of "H.E. Choden Rinpoche's holy relic tour in Vietnam", and an oral account of H.E. Choden Rinpoche's life, entitled "the life of a great Yogi - H.E. Choden Rinpoche", as given by his long-year attendant, Geshe Gyalten Kunga, has been recorded.
