= Geshe Lhundrup Rigsel =

Tibetan Buddhist abbot (1941–2011)

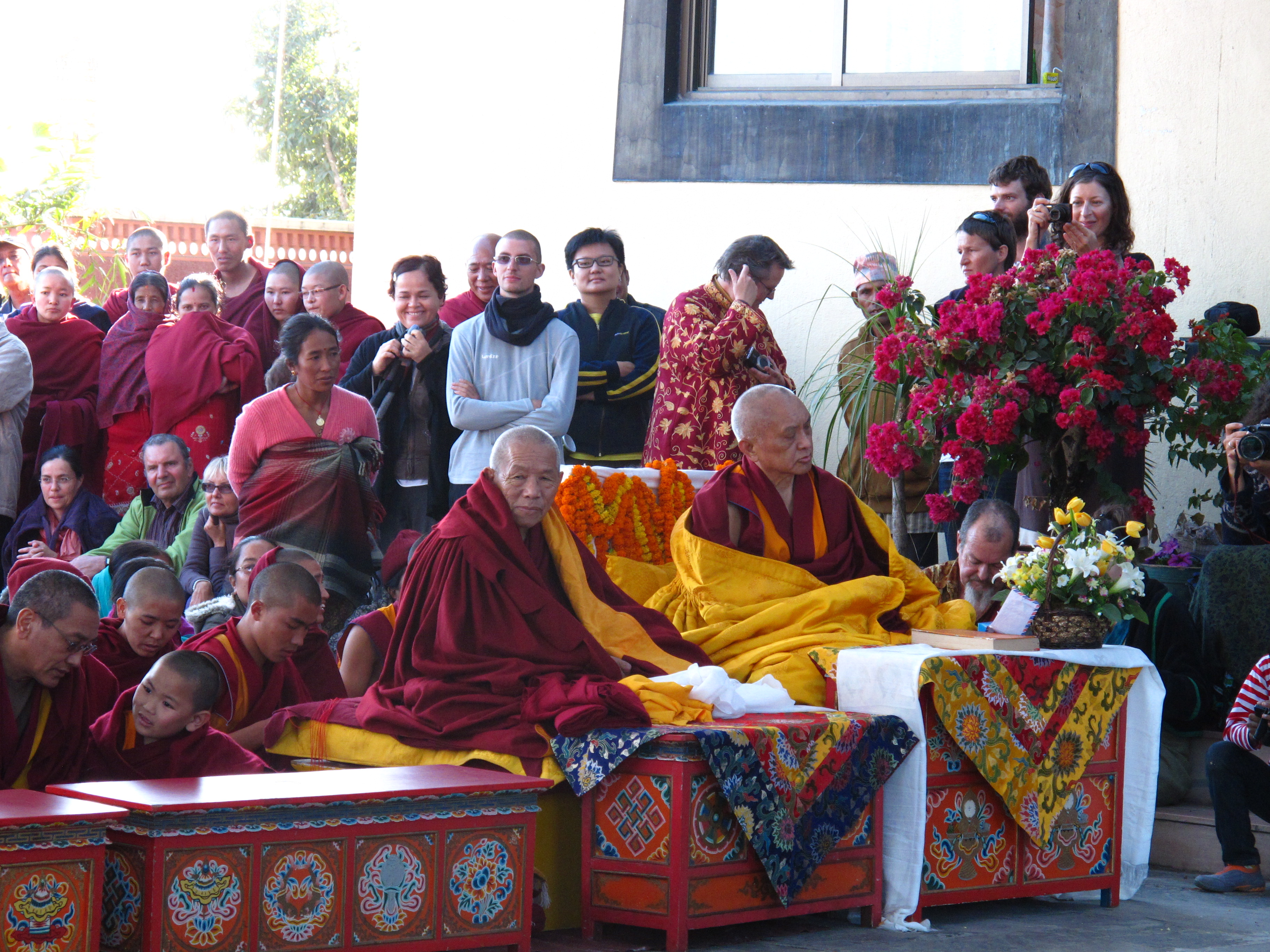
Tulku, Lama Lhundrup and Lama Zopa Rinpoche

Geshe Lhundrup Rigsel (sometimes called Lama Lhundrup) was abbot of Kopan Monastery in Nepal. He was born in 1941 to a poor peasant family in Tibet, and joined Sera Monastery as a boy. In 1959 he fled from the Chinese invasion of Tibet and went to India. - In Buxa, a refugee camp in Northern India, he met Lama Thubten Yeshe and Lama Zopa. In the late sixties he journeyed to South India to start the clearing of land for the new Sera Monastic University. He received his Doctor of Divinity in Buddhist studies from Sera.

In 1972 Geshe Lhundrup Rigsel was called to Kopan Monastery by Lama Yeshe, to teach Buddhist philosophy to the monks. The Dalai Lama appointed him abbot of Kopan Monastery in February 2000. As of 2011, Geshe Rigsel was on the board of directors of the Foundation for the Preservation of the Mahayana Tradition.

On September 7, 2011, Lama Lhundrup died due to cancer.

== See also ==
- Gelug
- Lam Rim
