= Lillian Too =

Malaysian businessman

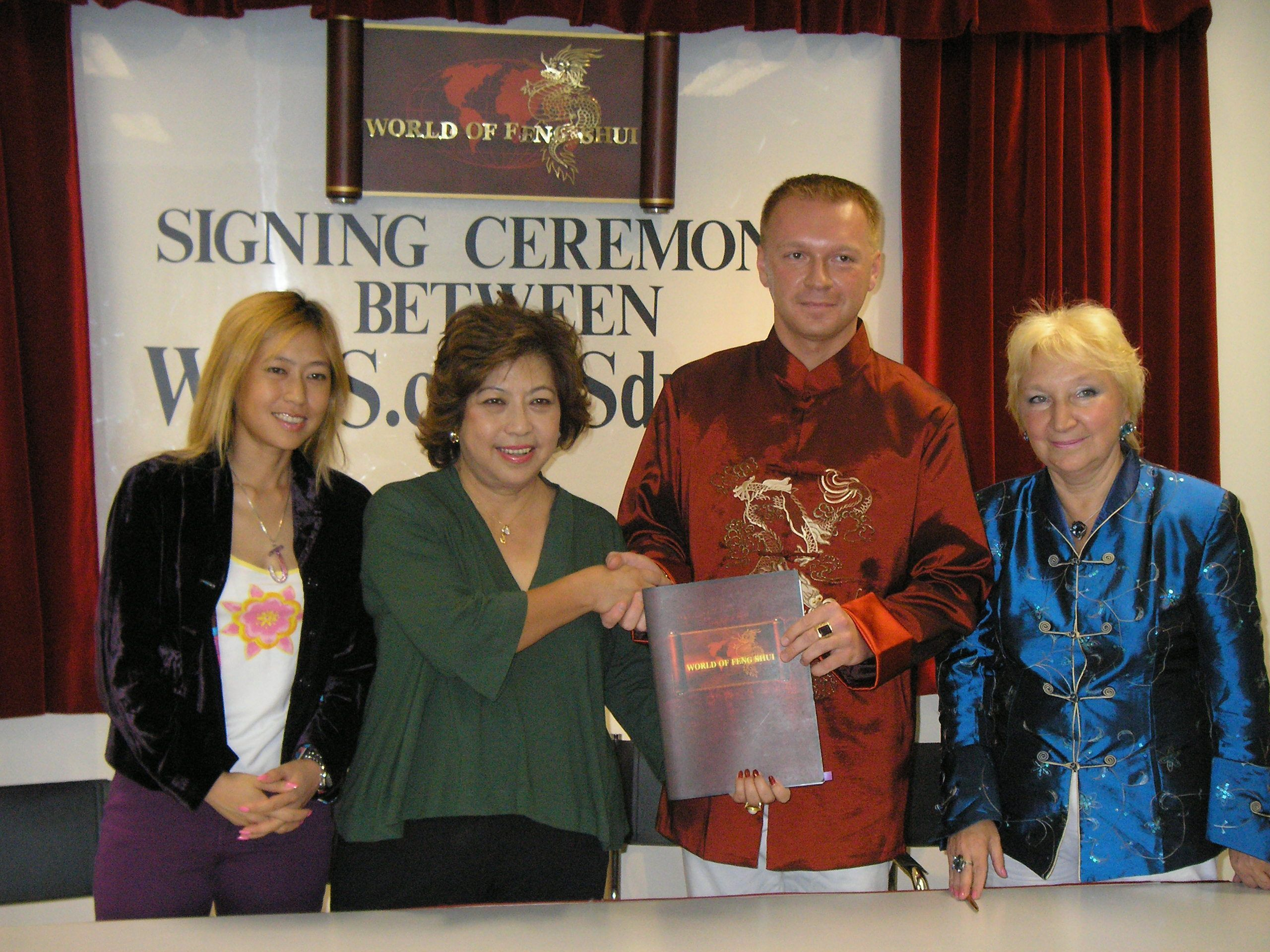
Lillian Too (second from left, in green blouse)

Lillian Too is an author, television personality and feng shui practitioner from Malaysia. She has written over 200 books on the subject of feng shui, which have been translated into more than 30 languages. Her books have sold more than 6 million copies around the world.

A graduate with an MBA from the Harvard Business School in 1976, Too embarked on a career in the corporate world and became the first woman in Malaysia to head a publicly listed company. In 1982, she became the first woman in Asia to be appointed CEO of a bank (Hong Kong's Dao Heng bank). After her stint in banking, she worked with prominent Hong Kong tycoon, Dickson Poon (former husband of Michelle Yeoh), as executive deputy chairman of his group of companies.

She is married, with one daughter Jennifer.

== World of Feng Shui ==
After retiring from her career in the banking and corporate world, Too founded World of Feng Shui (WOFS.com), a feng shui merchandising and franchising company, where she is the chairman. The franchise has stores in Brunei, Vietnam, Bangkok, Calcutta, Manila, Cebu, Tokyo, Las Vegas, Hawaii, Toronto, London, the Netherlands, Brussels, Madrid, Barcelona, Sydney, Melbourne, five stores in Indonesia and 23 stores in Malaysia. The company has a large feng shui resource website, wofs.com. Too is also the publisher of Feng Shui World magazine, a bi-monthly publication.

Too founded the Lillian Too Certified Consultants Institute, which runs correspondence courses and certification programs in feng shui. She also has a roadshow called Lillian Too's Feng Shui Extravaganza which was broadcast on the satellite television channel, Astro.

In 2006, she appeared in advertisements for the Malaysian mobile telephone company Celcom, together with her daughter, Jennifer Too.

== Tibetan Buddhist practice ==
In 1997, Too met Tibetan lama Thubten Zopa Rinpoche in Bodhgaya and took refuge with him. The Buddha Book describes her experience with Tibetan Buddhism in more detail, and recommends various practices promoted by the FPMT, a network of dharma centers co-founded by Zopa. (An appendix of the same book lists worldwide addresses of these centres.) Too is former president and centre director of the FPMT's Losang Drakpa Centre in Selangor, Malaysia.

== Books by Lillian Too ==
According to thingsasian.com, The Complete Illustrated Guide to Feng Shui holds the record for the highest sales for a color hardcover book, with more than 600,000 copies sold to date. "Her other books have made it to best seller lists in the United States, Singapore and Germany."

Publication year	Title	ISBN
1994	Chinese Numerology in Feng Shui	ISBN 983-9778-72-2
1998	Lillian Too's Little Book of Feng Shui	ISBN 1-86204-514-3
1999	Creating Abundance with Feng Shui	ISBN 0-7126-7036-X
1999	Lillian Too's Easy-to-use Feng Shui: 168 ways to success	ISBN 1-85585-690-5
2000	Lillian Too's Feng Shui Success Secrets	ISBN 1-85585-844-4
2001	Lillian Too's Smart Feng Shui for the Home	ISBN 0-00-711750-7
2001	Lillian Too's Irresistible Feng Shui Magic	ISBN 0-00-711701-9
2002	Lillian Too's 168 Feng Shui Ways to Declutter Your Home	ISBN 1-903116-61-9
2002	Lillian Too's Love in a Box	ISBN 0-00-712956-4
2002	Lillian Too's Flying Star Feng Shui for the Master Practitioner	ISBN 0-00-712957-2
2003	Lillian Too's Flying Star Feng Shui for Period 8	ISBN 983-9778-76-5
2003	Feng Shui Life Planner	ISBN 0-600-60902-2
2005	Lillian Too's 168 Feng Shui Ways to a Calm & Happy Life	ISBN 1-904991-26-2
2005	Total Feng Shui	ISBN 0-8118-4530-3
2007	Lillian Too's 168 Feng Shui Ways to Energize Your Life	ISBN 978-1-904991-94-6
2007	Unlocking the Secrets of Chinese Fortune Telling	ISBN 978-1-905695-30-0
2009	Lillian Too's Feng Shui Workbook: Transform Your Home for Health and Happiness	ISBN 1-906525-51-X
2009	Living with Good Feng Shui by Lillian Too	ISBN 978-967-3-29015-4
2010	Lillian Too's 168 Ways to Harness Your Lucky Numbers for Happiness, Wealth and Success	ISBN 1-907030-09-3

- The Complete Illustrated Guide to Feng Shui: How to Apply the Secrets of Chinese Wisdom for Health, Wealth and Happiness. Element Books (1996). ISBN 1-85230-902-4.
- Water Feng Shui for Wealth. Konsep Books (1996). ISBN 983-9778-03-X.
- Flying Star Feng Shui. Konsep Books (1996). ISBN 983-9778-72-2.
- Applied Pa-kua and Lo Shu Feng Shui. Konsep Books (1996). ISBN 983-99825-8-3.
- Eight Easy Lessons: Lillian Too's Feng Shui Kit: All You Need to Get Started with Feng Shui (Feng Shui Fundamentals). HarperCollins (1997). ISBN 1-86204-150-4.
- Chinese Astrology for Romance. Konsep Books (1997). ISBN 983-9778-00-5.
- Practical Applications of Feng Shui (Feng Shui Series). Quiller (1998)ISBN 0-9587113-1-3.
- Applied Pa-Kua and Lo Shu Feng Shui: In Collaboration with Feng Shui Master Yap Cheng Hai. Lillian Too & Yap Cheng Hai. Oriental Publications (1998). ISBN 0-9587113-0-5.
- Lillian Too's Easy-To-Use Feng Shui For Love: 168 Ways To Happiness -Enhance Your Relationships Energize Your Friendships, Maximize Your Love Potential. Sterling (2000). ISBN 1-85585-758-8.
- Lillian Too's Practical Feng Shui – Symbols of Good Fortune. (Element Books, 2000). ISBN 1-86204-795-2.
- Lillian Too's Fortune & Feng Shui (insert year and zodiac animal) with Jennifer Too. (Konsep Lagenda SDN BHD (223 855) ISBN 978-983-3263-66-0
- Lillian Too's Practical Feng Shui – Formulas for Success. (Element Books, 2000). ISBN 1-86204-563-1.
- Lillian Too's Little Book of Creating Abundance. Rider & Co (2000). ISBN 0-7126-0065-5.
- Die Grundlagen des Feng Shui. Droemer Knaur (2000). ISBN 3-426-87064-9.
- 128 Easy Tips for Work and Career (Lillian Too's Feng Shui in Small Doses). Oriental Publications (2000). ISBN 983-9778-13-7.
- Creating Abundance with Feng Shui. Wellspring/Ballantine (2000). ISBN 0-345-43743-8.
- Illustrated Encyclopedia of Feng Shui: The Complete Guide to the Art and Practice of Feng Shui (Illustrated Encyclopedia) . Element Books (2001). ISBN 1-86204-589-5.
- Ultimate Healing : The Power of Compassion. Wisdom Publications (2001). ISBN 0-86171-195-5.
- The Complete Illustrated Guide to Feng Shui for Gardeners (Complete Illustrated Guide). Element Books (2002). ISBN 0-00-713324-3.
- Discover Yourself: Understand Your Mind, Know Your Body, Nurture Your Spirit, Realize Your Potential. Hay House (2003). ISBN 1-4019-0152-2.
- The Buddha Book: Buddhas Blessings, Prayers and Rituals to Grant You Love, Wisdom, and Healing. Element Books (2003). ISBN 0-00-711702-7.
- The New I Ching: Discover the Secrets of the Plum Blossom Oracle. Lillian Too & Jane Evans. Hamlyn (2004). ISBN 0-600-60917-0.

== The Lillian Too Show ==
Following the success of Lillian Too's Feng Shui Extravaganza, Too began recording a 13-episode series called The Lillian Too Show in 2004. The 30-minute show was broadcast in English with Chinese subtitles. Running for 13 weeks, the series covered everyday concerns from personal wealth accumulation to general improvement in the quality of life, to more specific topics. The series premièred on the satellite channel, Astro AEC, on 15 September 2004, with repeats on Astro@15. The first series was also released for distribution on DVD format. In 2006, the new series were aired on Astro Prima and the new season also features Too's daughter, Jennifer Too.
