= Thubten Gyatso (Australian monk) =

Thubten Gyatso (born Adrian Feldmann) is an Australian monk.

Feldmann went to the University of Melbourne following his 1946 birth. He began his monk experience after leaving medicine.

== Books ==
Gyatso most recent book is, A Leaf in the Wind. He also wrote The Perfect Mirror: Reflections on Truth and Illusion .

== See also ==
- FPMT
- Gelug
- Lama Yeshe
- Lama Zopa
- Nick Ribush
- Thubten Shedrup Ling
