= Tashi Tsering (Jamyang Buddhist Centre) =

Tibetan Buddhist philosopher (born 1958)

Tashi Tsering BEM
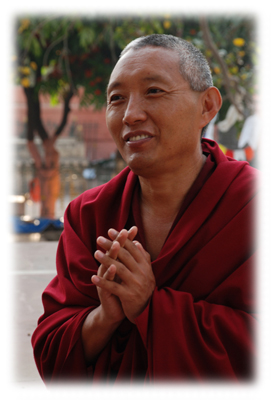
- Geshe Tashi Tsering
- Title: Geshe

Personal life
- Born: 1958 (age 67–68) Purang, Tibet
- Education: School of Oriental and African Studies
- Occupation: Dalai Lama Centre for Tibetan and Ancient Indian Wisdom
- Website: geshetashi.org

Religious life
- Religion: Buddhism
- Temple: Sera Mey Monastic University (2019-2024)
- Philosophy: Nalanda
- Monastic name: Serme Khen Rinpoche
- Initiation: 1988; Sera Mey Monastic University

Senior posting
- Present post: Dalai Lama Centre for Tibetan and Ancient Indian Wisdom (2024)
- Previous post: Nalanda Monastery (1991-1994); Jamyang Buddhist Centre (1994-2018)

Serme Khen Rinpoche Geshe Tashi Tsering BEM (Tibetan: བཀྲ་ཤིས་ཚེ་རིང་, Wylie: Bkra-shis Tse-ring) (born 1958) was abbot of Sera Mey Monastic University in India until 2024. From 1994 to 2018, he was the resident Tibetan Buddhist teacher at Jamyang Buddhist Centre, London.

Tsering was born in Purang, Tibet in 1958, and his parents escaped to India in 1959. He entered Sera Mey Monastic University in South India when he was 13 years old, and graduated with a Lharampa Geshe degree 16 years later. Geshe Tashi then entered the Higher Tantric College (Gyuto) for a year of study.

Tsering's teaching career began at Sera, after which he taught the monks at Kopan Monastery, Nepal for a year. He went on to the Gandhi Foundation College in Nagpur, India and then moved to Europe, initially to Nalanda Monastery in the South of France.

From 1994 to 2018, Tsering was resident teacher at Jamyang Buddhist Centre in London. In 2017 he received a master's degree in social anthropology from the School of Oriental and African Studies in London.

In the west, Tsering teaches in English and is renowned for his warmth, clarity and humour. Besides Jamyang, he has been a regular guest teacher at other Buddhist centres in the UK and around the world. He is also the creator and original teacher of the Foundation of Buddhist Thought Course, a two-year course which gives an overview of Tibetan Buddhist study and practice.

In March 2018 it was announced that Geshe Tashi Tsering had been asked by the Dalai Lama to become abbot of Sera Mey Monastic University in India. He was enthroned as abbot on 17 June 2018.

In June 2019 he was awarded the British Empire Medal in the Queen's birthday honours list for services to Buddhism in the UK.

In March 2024 it was announced that Geshi Tashi Tsering would step down as abbot of Sera Mey to become the Director of the Dalai Lama Centre for Tibetan and Ancient Indian Wisdom in Bodhgaya.

== Bibliography ==
- Geshe Tashi Tsering, (2005). Four Noble Truths: The Foundation of Buddhist Thought, Volume 1 Wisdom Books, ISBN 0-86171-270-6
- Geshe Tashi Tsering, (2008). Relative Truth, Ultimate Truth: The Foundation of Buddhist Thought, Volume 2 Wisdom Books, ISBN 0-86171-270-6
- Geshe Tashi Tsering, (2006). Buddhist Psychology: The Foundation of Buddhist Thought, Volume 3, Wisdom Books, ISBN 0-86171-272-2
- Geshe Tashi Tsering, (2008). The Awakening Mind: The Foundation of Buddhist Thought, Volume 4, Wisdom Books, ISBN 0-86171-510-1
- Geshe Tashi Tsering, (2009). Emptiness: The Foundation of Buddhist Thought, Volume 5, Wisdom Books, ISBN 0-86171-511-X
- Geshe Tashi Tsering, (2012). Tantra: The Foundation of Buddhist Thought, Volume 6, Wisdom Books, ISBN 1-61429-011-3
