= Daja Wangchuk Meston =

American activist and author (1970–2010)

Daja Wangchuk Meston (September 1970 – July 11, 2010) was an American activist and author who was raised as a Tibetan Buddhist monk. In 2007 he published his memoir, Comes the Peace: My Journey to Forgiveness.

He was the grandson of John Meston, the screenwriter. Daja's mother Feather is the daughter of John Meston from his first marriage.

Meston was taken to Nepal at the age of 3 after his mother was drawn there for religious reasons. After being ordained as a Tibetan Buddhist nun by Lama Thubten Yeshe his mother placed Meston as a foster child with a Tibetan family, and at the age of 6, he was given to the care of Kopan Monastery as a novice monk. Gradually his nun-mother became a source of confusion and embarrassment because her infrequent visits to the monastery drew unwanted attention to the lone, white boy monk. Meston remembered his time in the monastery as a terrible experience--partly because he was a white outsider and also because young monks were treated and fed so poorly. He was expelled as a teenager for violating the vow of celibacy, and--despite being culturally Tibetan and unable to speak much English--he was sent "home," first to Italy and then to California, where he lived with his unknown step-grandmother (a former bullfighter). He eventually made his way to Boston where he enrolled at Brandeis University and graduated in 1996.

Meston attracted international attention in 1999, while investigating the World Bank's highly controversial Western Poverty Reduction Project in Qinghai. Arrested and detained by the police on suspicion of espionage, he escaped by jumping from a third-story window but was seriously injured. The Chinese authorities released him on humanitarian grounds after pressure from family, friends, NGOs, US and European governments and international supporters. The People's Republic of China banned him from entering Tibet.

After a long struggle with depression, Meston committed suicide on July 11, 2010.
