= Maitripa College =

Tibetan Buddhist College

- Established: 2005
- Affiliations: Tibetan Buddhist
- President: Namdrol Miranda Adams
- Location: Portland, Oregon, United States
- Website: maitripa.org

Maitripa College, founded in 2005 as Maitripa Institute, is a Tibetan Buddhist college located in Portland, Oregon, United States. It is an affiliated member of the Foundation for the Preservation of the Mahayana Tradition (FPMT), an international network of dharma centers of the Gelugpa school. It is the first and only Tibetan Buddhist college in the Pacific Northwest.

The institute's name was chosen by FPMT spiritual director Thubten Zopa Rinpoche. It honors the eleventh century yogin Maitripa (the guru of Marpa and disciple of Naropa) who taught at the great monastic universities of Nalanda and Vikramashila.

Maitripa's founding president was Yangsi Rinpoche, a tulku and Lharampa Geshe who graduated from Sera Je (Se Rva Byas) and Gyume Tantric College.

== Academic programs ==
Maitripa College identifies three pillars of its curriculum: Buddhist philosophy, meditation, and community service.

The college offers two master's degrees—an M.A. in Buddhist Studies, and a Master of Divinity. The M.A. consists of 2–3 years of full-time study, culminating in a thesis or final exam. The Master of Divinity program is a 3-5 year program, depending on the rate of study, oriented towards in-depth spiritual development and professional chaplaincy. The core coursework is shared between the two programs, except for Tibetan language which is required for the M.A. but not the M.Div.

In 2025, based on its experiences during the Covid-19 pandemic, the college transitioned to low-residency programs using digital learning platforms.

Maitripa College is a nonprofit corporation authorized by the State of Oregon (Office of Degree Authorization) to offer and confer the degrees described herein. However, it lacks regional accreditation.

== Public programs ==
Maitripa College also offers a full schedule of public programs, including weekly dharma teachings, morning meditation, workshops and retreats that are open to the public. These feature traditional Tibetan religious teachers, scholars in the field of Buddhist Studies, and practitioners from a variety of faiths. The Public Program calendar also offers psychology workshops that are approved by the APA for continuing education credit.

== 2026 Yangsi Rinpoche abuse allegations ==
On 3 June 2026, the Portland alternative weekly Williamette Week reported on allegations of sexual / spiritual abuse by Yangsi Rinpoche, the college's president and spiritual director since its founding. His former student, Sunitha Bhaskaran, accused Yangi of abusing his authority as guru to coerce her into a five-year sexual relationship. Yangsi (aka Kesang Tuladhar) denied the allegations, but was placed on leave by Maitripa's board pending a third-party investigation by Carol Merchasin (whose report has not been released). Bhaskaran reports receiving pressure from several board members to forgive Yangsi. Maitripa's chief academic officer (and Yangsi's personal assistant), Miranda Adams (“Namdrol"), reportedly refused Bhaskaran a copy of the Merchasin report. Adams has served as Rinpoche’s attendant for decades, and she and Rinpoche and her husband own a house together. Adams is now the college president.
