= Maitreya Project =

International Buddhist organization

Computer-generated rendering of the Maitreya Project Statue as originally proposed.

The Maitreya Project is an international organisation, operating since 1990, which intends to construct statues of Maitreya Buddha in India and perhaps elsewhere. Initial plans were for a 152-metre (500 ft) colossal statue, to be built in either Kushinagar or Bodhgaya. These plans have since changed, and the Maitreya Project now intends to construct relatively modest statues in both towns. The project was initiated by the Foundation for the Preservation of the Mahayana Tradition, an organisation within the Gelug school of Tibetan Buddhism.

Jessica Marie Falcone's Battling the Buddha of Love: A Cultural Biography of the Greatest Statue Never Built (Cornell University Press, 2018; based on her Ph.D. dissertation in cultural anthropology for Cornell) is about controversy over the planned statue between FPMT participants and Kushinagari farmers, and the meaning of the statue to both sides.

== Laying of the foundation stone in Kushinagar ==
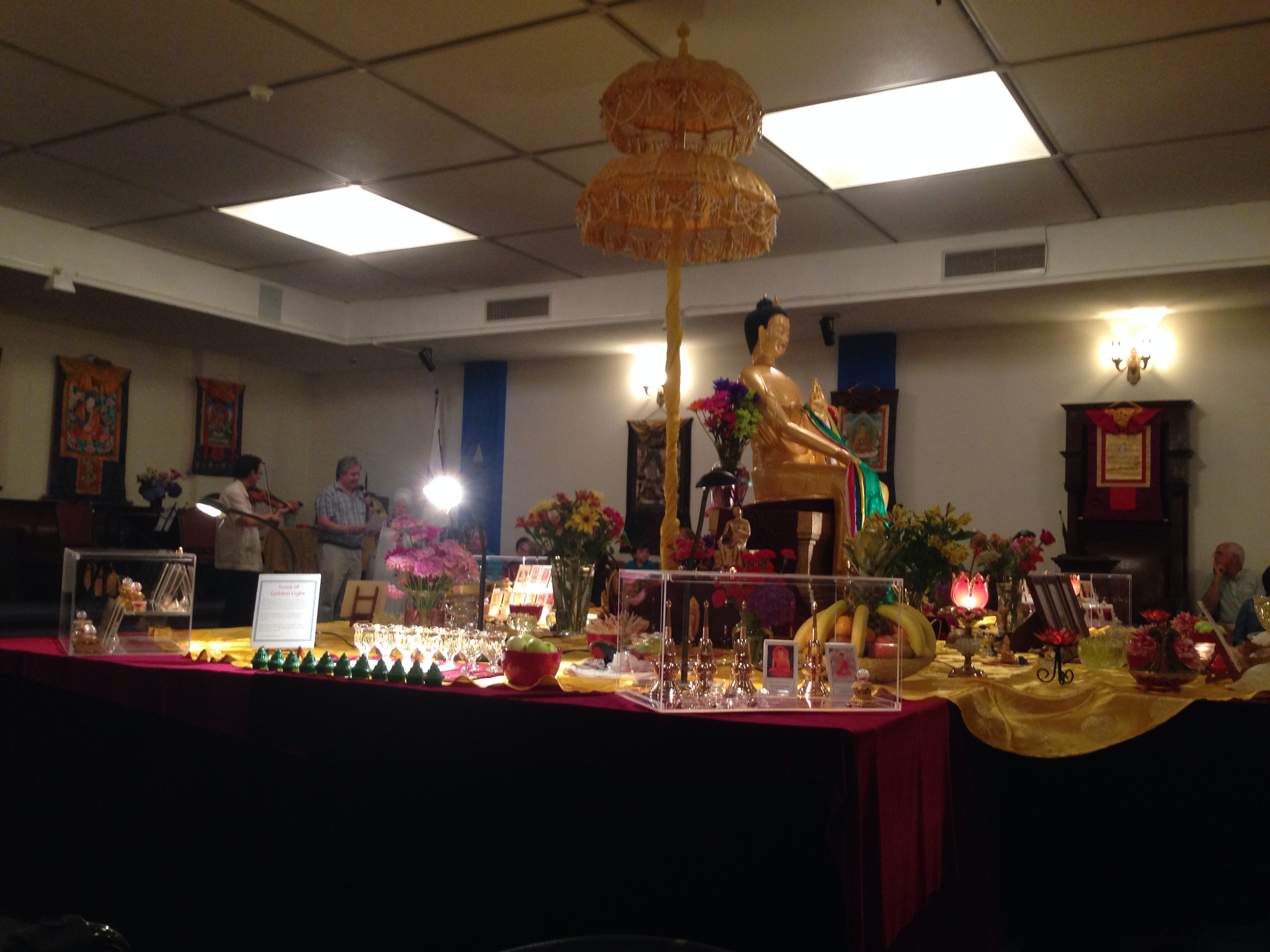
Maitreya Project Relic Roadshow.

On Friday 13 December 2013 the State Government of Uttar Pradesh handed over approximately 275 acres (111 ha) of land for the site of the Maitreya Project in Kushinagar. The land is immediately adjacent to the Parinirvana Temple denoting the place where Buddha Shakyamuni passed into Parinirvana, and the Rambhar Stupa which marks the holy site of Buddha's cremation.

On that same day, the Chief Minister of Uttar Pradesh, Akhilesh Yadav, presided over a foundation stone laying ceremony on this land. Maitreya Project's Spiritual Director, Lama Zopa Rinpoche and the Board of Trustees of the Maitreya Project Trust attended as state guests.

== Finances ==
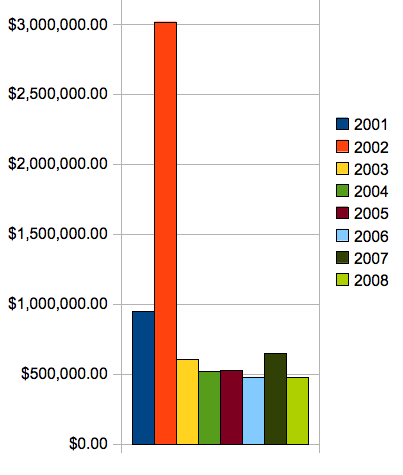
Maitreya Project International, California entity, Gross Annual Revenue 2001–2008 in US$

The Project reports for 1990–2008 outgoings of more than US$20 million and investment of more than US$11 million.

Nita Ing has taken over responsibility for the funding of the statue in Bodhgaya.

== Criticism ==
There has been criticism in the press about some aspects of the Project, including the compulsory acquisition, under "India's Land Acquisition Act", by the State Government of 660 acres (2.7 km^{2}) of private land, homes and small farms; which are intended to be leased to the Project, for construction of the statue and related infrastructure, including "landscaped park housing a cathedral, monastery, convent, guesthouse, library and food halls...". Peter Kedge, former Director and CEO of the Maitreya Project has posted a number of replies to these criticisms.

Following the 1,262nd day of "peaceful dharna", in August 2010, by the majority of local farmers against the compulsory acquisition of their farms, the Cabinet Secretary of Uttar Pradesh announced a reconsideration of support for the Project.

== Academic Papers ==
Falcone, Jessica. 2011. “The Buddhist Lama and the Indian Farmer: Negotiating Modernity and Tradition in the Development Plans for Kushinagar, India.” In Inequality in a Globalizing World: Perspectives, Processes, and Experiences, edited by Sangeeta Parashar Nandikotkur and Yong Wang, 107–117. Dubuque, IA: Kendall-Hunt Publishing.
