= Hita (disambiguation) =

Hita may refer to:

== Places ==
- Hita, Guadalajara, Mexico
- Hita, Ōita, Japan
  - Hita Station, railway station in Hita
- Hita District, Ōita, Japan

== Other uses ==
- Tenzin Ösel Hita, Spanish Buddhist teacher
