= Soname Yangchen =

Soname
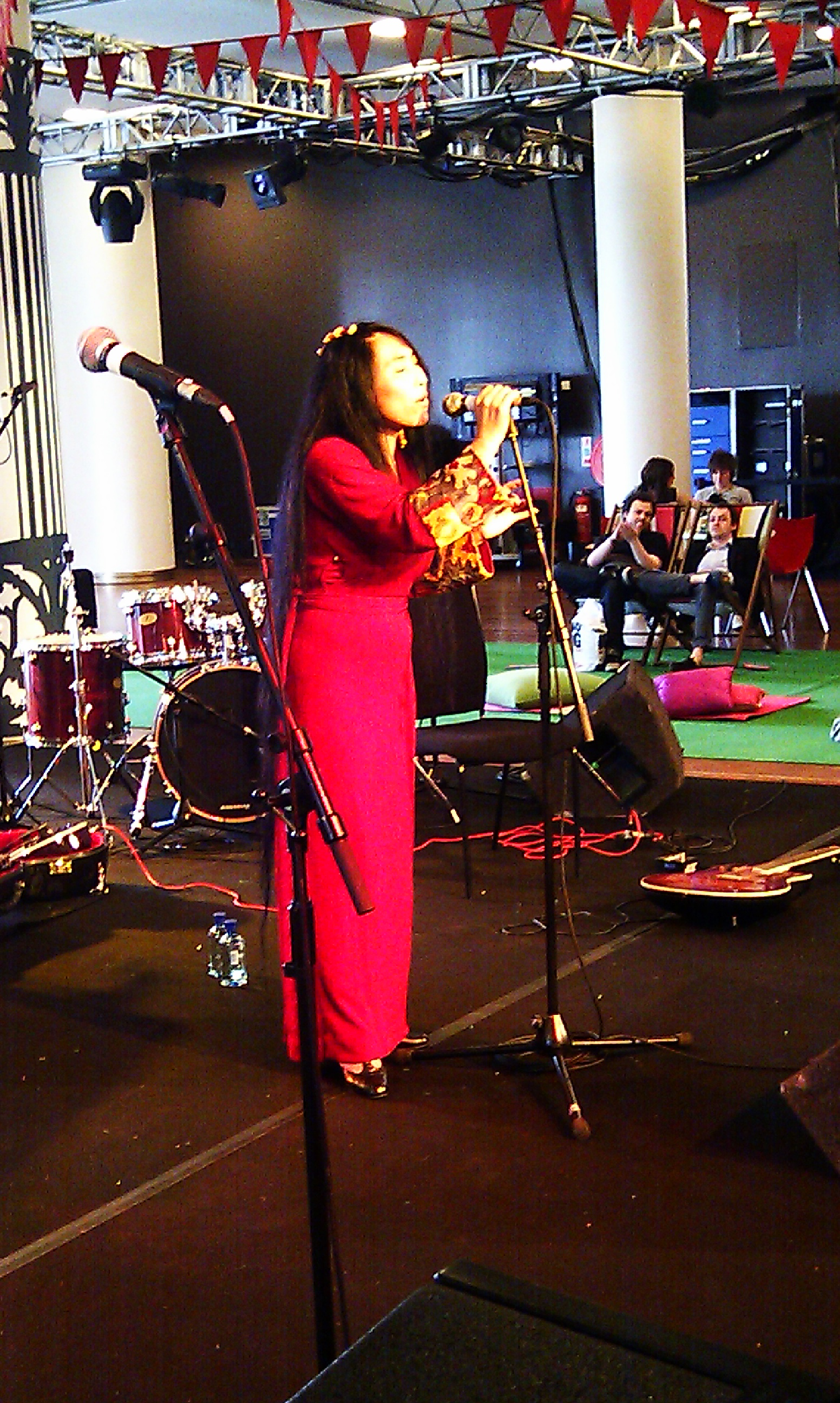

Background information
- Born: 1973 (age 52–53); Tibet
- Website: www.soname.com

Soname Yangchen (born 1973 in Tibet) is a British singer and a songwriter of Tibetan descent.

== Biography ==
Soname Yangchen was born in the Yarlung Valley at the time of the Cultural Revolution in Tibet, into a noble family which was poorly regarded by the Chinese government. As a child, she was passionate for singing, and was sent to live for 7 years with her aunt in Lhasa. At the age of 16, she left Lhasa and crossed the Himalayas by foot to reach India. Her singing talents were "discovered" during a spontaneous performance at a friend's wedding, and she started singing professionally in England, becoming known worldwide, touring Europe, appearing at festivals in Australia and other places. She began by interpreting the traditional songs of her grandmother, and then songs of her composition. As of 2014, she has published two books. In 2003, she gave a gala at the Royal Opera in London. In September 2004 she performed Tibetan folk and spiritual songs at a world music concert at LSO St Luke's, London.

== Publication ==
- 2006: Soname Yangchen, with Vicki Mackenzie, Child of Tibet: the story of Soname's flight to freedom. London: Portrait ISBN 0749950978
