= Thubten Shedrup Ling =

Tibetan Buddhist monastery near Bendigo, Victoria, Australia

Coordinates: 36°43′9″S 144°11′20″E

Thubten Shedrup Ling is an Australian monastery. It is located near Bendigo, Victoria.

== See also ==
- Gelug
- Thubten Gyatso (Australian monk)
- Tibetan Buddhism
