= Pomaia =

- Frazione
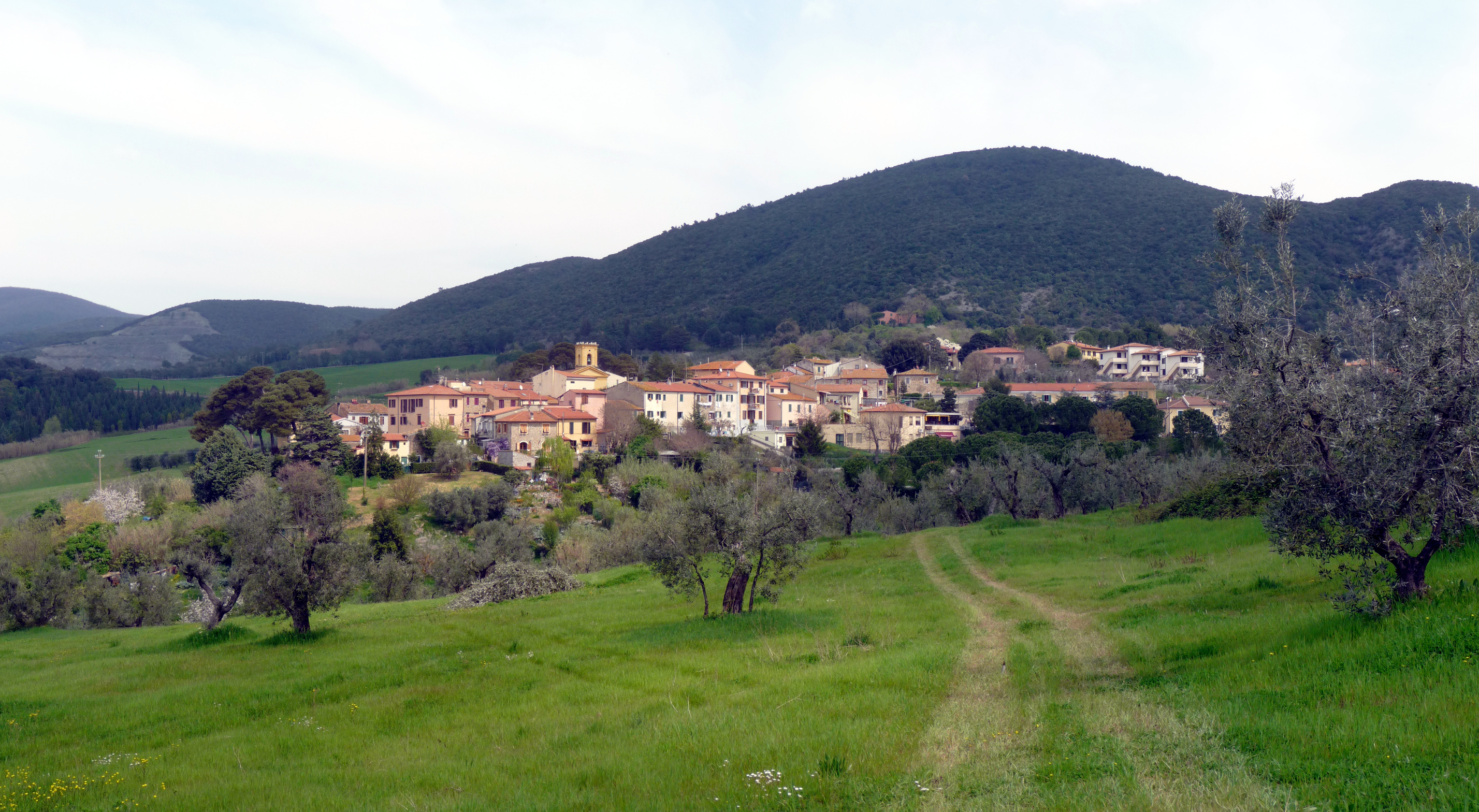
- View of Pomaia

- Location of Pomaia in Italy
- Coordinates: 43°26′2″N 10°33′59″E
- Country: Italy
- Region: Tuscany
- Province: Pisa (PI)
- Comune: Santa Luce
- Elevation: 176 m (577 ft)

Population (2011)
  - Total: 264
- Demonym: Pomaiesi
- Time zone: UTC+1 (CET)
  - Summer (DST): UTC+2 (CEST)
- Postal code: 56040
- Dialing code: (+39) 050

Pomaia is a village in Tuscany, central Italy, administratively a frazione of the comune of Santa Luce, in the Province of Pisa. At the time of the 2001 census its population amounted to 188.

The village is known for the Lama Tzong Khapa Institute, one of the biggest Tibetan monasteries in Italy.

Pomaia has an economy based on agriculture and tourism.

== Main sights ==
- Church of Santo Stefano, it is the main parish church of the village.
