= Tenzin Ösel Hita =

Spanish teacher of Tibetan Buddhism and filmmaker

Tenzin Ösel Hita Torres
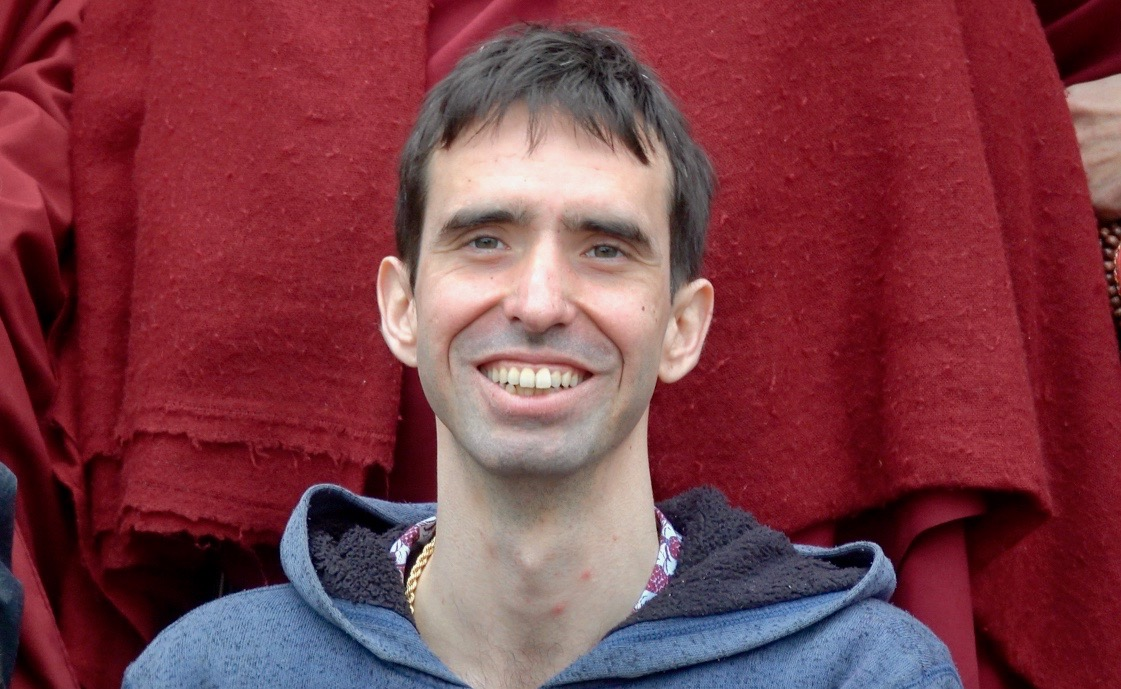
- At Institut Vajra Yogini, France, December 2018
- Born: 1985 (age 40–41); Bubión, Spain

Tenzin Ösel Hita Torres (born 1985 in Bubión, Granada, Spain) is a Tibetan Buddhist tulku, the recognized reincarnation of FPMT co-founder Thubten Yeshe. As a child "Lama Ösel" was heavily promoted by the Foundation for the Preservation of the Mahayana Tradition, and made the subject of a book by Vicki Mackenzie, Reincarnation: The Boy Lama (Wisdom Publications, 1996). Raised in India as a boy monk, Hita gave up robes and returned to Spain on attaining his majority. Though still a devout Buddhist, he now reports a vexed relationship with the FPMT, whose board he served on from 2008 to 2011.

== Life ==
Born the fifth child of María Torres (later a travel agent) and Francisco "Paco" Hita (a construction worker), he was initially given the name "Ösel Hita Torres" (with Hita as the primary surname, following Spanish custom). As Spanish hippies, the parents had been converted to Buddhism by Lama Yeshe, and organized an FPMT retreat center in Bubión. On the death of Lama Yeshe, FPMT participants began speculating that the newborn Ösel was Yeshe's reincarnation. Taken to Dharamshala, Himanchal Pradesh, India at the age of fourteen months, he was recognized by the fourteenth Dalai Lama as the tulku of Lama Yeshe, and enthroned at the Tushita Meditation Centre on 17 March 1987, receiving the new name of "Tenzin Ösel Rinpoche" (བསྟན་འཛིན་འོད་གསལ་རིན་པོ་ཆེ།). He then returned to Spain, but at the age of six, was sent to the exile version of Sera Je Monastery, near Mysore, Karnataka. His parents divorced at some point after that. Around 1993, his mother took "Lama Ösel" back to Spain; however, according to a New York Times report,

when she sent Osel to visit his father, who was living in a Buddhist community in England, he whisked the child to Nepal. A temporary compromise was reached, with Osel's father agreeing to live with the boy in a Tibetan monastery in southern India. Miss Torres visits him for a month a year. The monks also agreed to let him have a teacher from Spain for language, history and culture.

Ösel's status disrupted the lives of his nine siblings as well, since they too had to travel in order for their mother to be with Ösel. Hita would later recall that

my education and childhood have been very chaotic and unstructured without any consideration for the innocent child i was. I was forced to tour FPMT centers since the age of 2, separated from my family, traveling with strangers who kept changing until the age of 6. After that i studied in the monastery till the age of 18. Those years were amazing as i was able to spend time with my dearest teacher Genla, Khensur Gendun Choephel. The kindness of my Gurus H.H. the Dalai Lama, Lama Zopa Rimpoche and Genla have always inspired me to understand the teachings of the Buddha and the philosophy of life of which they are the shining example of. My teacher Genla was the only stable person who was present in my entire childhood. Thanks to him i must say i was able to keep my sanity and hope during those long challenging years.

Nevertheless, Ösel chafed at monastic life:

At the age of 16, he managed to get special permission to stay three months with his mother, who had moved to live in Ibiza. Life on the island sparked a desire to move to the West and discover a world that was completely foreign to him. "The first afternoon I was in Ibiza, my mother took me to a nudist beach, and in the evening, to the youth gala at the Pacha nightclub. I went from a monastery where there wasn't even music to that," explains Osel, who remembers that it was at this point that he began to break down.

At eighteen, Hita left Sera Je permanently and disrobed. On his eighteenth birthday, he asked his mother whether he could be forced to return to Sera Je. She told him no; he decided not to return."I got a huge amount of letters and phone calls, and people coming to visit me," he recalls, "just telling me that I made a big mistake, that I lost a huge opportunity, that was my destiny, my purpose, blah-blah-blah, whatever."

Hita completed his high school education at St. Michaels University School, a private boarding school in Victoria, British Columbia, Canada. (The school was chosen by FPMT board member Peter Kedge.) After six months in an unidentified school in Switzerland, he transferred to the Complutense University of Madrid in 2006, earning a BA degree in cinematography in 2008. During this period, he apprenticed to Italian filmmaker Matteo Passigato in Bologna, and took various jobs in the TV and film industry. For several years, Hita would continue studying for further film-related credentials.In 2012, he co-directed the documentary short Being Your True Nature, chronicling a 2011 FPMT retreat.

In May 2009, Hita gave an interview for Babylon Magazine, a bilingual (Spanish/English) Madrid periodical, in which he seemed to distance himself from the FPMT, although he affirmed his belief in Tibetan Buddhism. Similar, but more pointed, remarks soon appeared in the Spanish newspaper El Mundo:

Con 14 meses ya me habían reconocido y llevado a la India. Me vistieron con un gorro amarillo, me sentaron en un trono, la gente me veneraba... Me sacaron de mi familia y me metieron en una situación medieval en la que he sufrido muchísimo. Era como vivir en una mentira.

[At 14 months I was recognized and taken to India. They dressed me in a yellow hat, they sat me on a throne, people worshipped me ... They took me away from my family and put me in a medieval situation in which I suffered a lot. It was like living a lie.]

Hita later disavowed these remarks, indicating that he had been misquoted.

Several news articles focus on what reporters portray as an avant-garde lifestyle--for example, Hita's attendance (and djembe performance) at the 2007 Burning Man festival. He reports having been homeless in Venice and Naples.

In later years, Hita would speak at, lead, or translate for FPMT events, and even briefly serve on the organization's board of trustees (2008-2011). At some point he began offering his own workshops, unaffiliated with the FPMT, called HAK (for "Habit Alignment Key"). He is the founder of the Global Tree Initiative as well as One World Orphanages, projects of the US nonprofit Universal Clear Light, Inc.. ("Clear Light" is the meaning of the name Ösel.)

In 2017, Hita had a son, Tenzin Norbu, with his then-partner, Brazilian-Spanish TCM practitioner Indila Dora Amaral.

In 2025, Hita wrote an open letter criticizing the FPMT board:

I must say that my relationship with the board in general has become a bit toxic since i resigned from being an FPMT board member in 2011. The only peaceful way to protest the disappointment of dynamics i experienced first hand. What i saw and lived at the time i was a board member was quite shocking in general. The structure of power, the manipulations, the lack of transparency, very little accountability, not much culture of appreciation, as well as the lack of ethics and hypocrisy really disturbed me, and i did not feel it was adequate to speak out about this at that time.[...] The board has not been following their own rules in numerous situations where they have not had any ethics, accountability, transparency or even professional behaviour. They are free to do whatever they want, as the structure of the organization is set up so that nobody can question their methods.

At the time of the letter, the FPMT board had been pressuring Hita to enter drug rehab, a program he insisted he did not need:

Basically, accepting their idea for me to go to rehab is very tricky and sneaky. If i accepted to let them put me in rehab, as a result it would radically change the public perception of me and make it official. I would become a mentally unstable person who is struggling with addiction. That would stay with me the rest of my life in the public view. And this is very very far from the truth.

Hita states that he does not currently use drugs or alcohol, although he has participated in ayahuasca ceremonies in the past. On his refusal to submit to rehab, the FPMT cut off an allowance which Lama Zopa had established, and reneged on promises to pay his son's school fees.

Some people may say i should get a job, and i answer to that. I have been literally working since age 2 generating money for the organization. I have never stopped studying or working to this day. Today some of my income comes from HAK retreats. December was the last HAK i participated in. At this time i'm looking to find odd jobs for the income i need to support myself and my son.

== Activities ==
In a video posted on YouTube in December 2018, on 27 December 2018 he gave a two-part, 3-hour long talk to students at the FPMT-affiliated Tibetan Buddhist Centre, Institut Vajra Yogini, at Lavaur, near Toulouse, France.

In November 2019, Hita showed his commitment to supporting the UK Daily Mirror's "Million Trees" Campaign, along with the 14th Dalai Lama and Hollywood legend Richard Gere. Tree planting has always been one of Osel’s passions and dreams. In January 2020, Osel formally launched the Global Tree Initiative through a WhatsApp chat group. People from around the world joined and various committees were established to handle different tasks. The goal was set to collect 100,000 tree plantings to offer to the Dalai Lama on July 6, 2020, to celebrate his 85th birthday.

== Documentaries ==
A documentary about Hita's life, called The Reluctant Lama, was broadcast on BBC Radio 4 on 28 September 2012. The documentary was produced by Beth O'Dea and presented by Jolyon Jenkins.

A documentary series about Hita's life, called Osel, was released on HBO Max in 2022.
