= Tushita Meditation Centre =

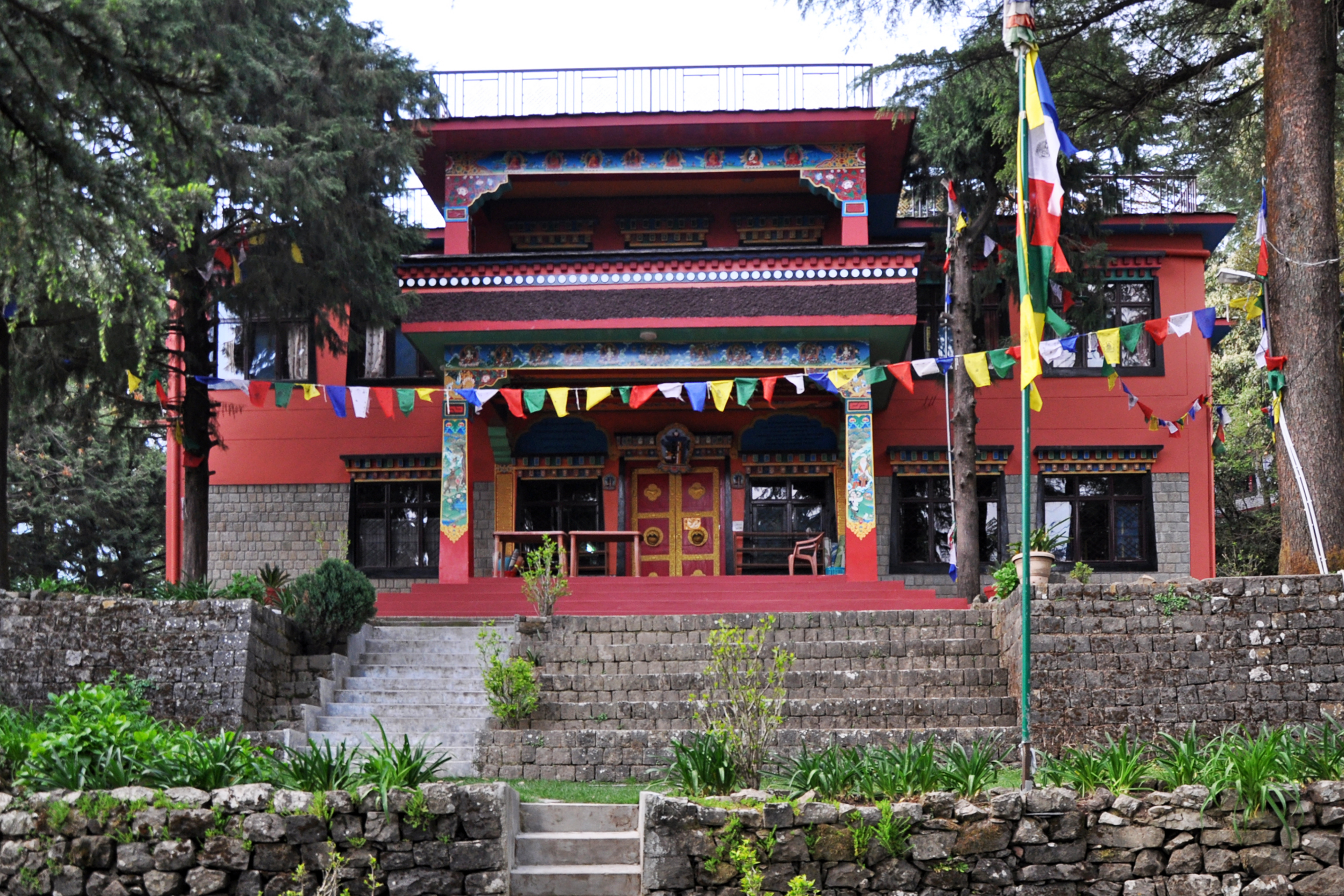

- Location in Himachal Pradesh, India

Religion
- Affiliation: Tibetan Buddhism
- Sect: Gelug

Location
- Country: India
- Interactive map of Tushita Meditation Centre
- Coordinates: 32.238602°N 76.323878°E

Architecture
- Founder: Lama Thubten Yeshe and Lama Zopa Rinpoche
- Established: 1972

Tushita ཏུ་ཤི་ཏ་ཐེག་ཆེན་སྒོམ་སྒྲུབ་བསྟི་གནས་ཁང་ is a centre for the study and practice of Buddhism from the Tibetan Mahayana tradition in Himachal Pradesh in northern India. It is located in the forested hills above the town of McLeod Ganj in village Dharamkot. The centre offers Introduction to Buddhism Courses and intermediate level courses for those who have already taken one of these introduction courses besides conducting Group Practice Retreats for practitioners of Tibetan Buddhism.

Due to the coronavirus pandemic, Tushita has moved to free online programmes since March 2020.

== History ==
After opening Kopan Monastery in Kathmandu, Lama Thubten Yeshe and his main student Lama Zopa Rinpoche decided to open a sister centre in response to the growing demand from their western students. In 1972, along with a few of their Western students, the Lamas bought an old colonial house on a hill above McLeod Ganj town at village Dharamkot in the Indian state of Himachal Pradesh. Courses were started at the centre founded there, initially named Tushita Retreat Centre. It was later renamed Tushita Meditation Centre.
