= Vicki Mackenzie =

- Born: 1947 (age 78–79); England
- Occupations: Journalist, author
- Years active: 1960s-present

Vicki Mackenzie (born 1947), an author and journalist, was born in England and spent much of her early life in Australia. The daughter of a naval officer, she graduated from Queensland University and became a reporter at the Sun newspaper in Sydney.

Later she moved on to London where she worked as a features writer on the Daily Sketch and the Daily Mail. She went on to write for the Sunday Times, The Observer, the Daily Telegraph, the Sunday Telegraph, the Daily Express, the Mail on Sunday and many national magazines.

== Buddhism ==
Since taking a month-long meditation course in Nepal in 1976, her primary interest has been to make the profundity of Buddhist philosophy accessible to the general public. Her books on Buddhism and reincarnation include:

- Reincarnation: the Boy Lama
- Reborn in the West: the Reincarnation Masters, Da Capo Press, 1996, ISBN 1569248265, 9781569248263
- Cave in the Snow: a Western woman's quest for enlightenment, 1999, ISBN 1-58234-045-5 (a biography of Tenzin Palmo, also about Freda Bedi)
- Why Buddhism?: Westerners in search of wisdom
- Child of Tibet (co-authored with Soname Yangchen), 2006
- The Revolutionary Life of Freda Bedi: British Feminist, Indian Nationalist, Buddhist Nun, 2017

She was interviewed by the Radio National program The Spirit of Things in 2002 about her book, Why Buddhism? Westerners in Search of Wisdom. Her book Cave in the Snow: a woman's quest for enlightenment was reviewed in Minneapolis City Pages.

== See also ==
- Tenzin Palmo
- Lama Osel
- Lama Yeshe
- Tibetan Buddhism
