= Foundation for the Preservation of the Mahayana Tradition =

Organization based in Portland, Oregon

- Abbreviation: FPMT
- Formation: 1975
- Founders: Thubten Yeshe; Thubten Zopa Rinpoche
- Type: Tibetan Buddhism
- Headquarters: Portland, Oregon; United States
- Executive Director: Roger Kunsang (acting)
- Website: fpmt.org

The Foundation for the Preservation of the Mahayana Tradition (FPMT) was founded in 1975 by Gelugpa Lamas Thubten Yeshe and Thubten Zopa Rinpoche, who began teaching Tibetan Buddhism to Western students in Nepal. The FPMT has grown to encompass over 138 dharma centers, projects, and services in 34 countries. Lama Yeshe led the organization until his death in 1984, followed by Lama Zopa until his death in 2023. The FPMT is now without a spiritual director; meetings on the organization's structure and future are being held.

== Location ==
The FPMT's international headquarters are in Portland, Oregon, United States. The central office has previously been located at:

- 2000-2005 Taos, New Mexico
- 1989-2000 Soquel, California (Land of Medicine Buddha)
- 1984-1989 Pomaia, Italy (Istituto Lama Tzong Khapa)
- 1975-1984 Kathmandu, Nepal (Kopan Monastery)

As of 2023, the FPMT has 138 centers, projects, and services in 34 countries worldwide, of which about 85 are dharma centers (monasteries and retreat centers often have a public-teaching function, which would raise the count), some 18 are unincorporated "study groups," and the rest a mix of other projects, such as hospices or dharma presses.

== History ==
The name and structure of the FPMT date to 1975, in the wake of an international teaching tour by Lamas Yeshe and Zopa. However, the two had been teaching Western travelers since at least 1965, when they met Zina Rachevsky, their student and patron, in Darjeeling. In 1969, the three of them founded the Nepal Mahayana Gompa Centre (now Kopan Monastery). Rachevsky died shortly afterwards during a Buddhist retreat.

Lama Yeshe resisted Rachevsky's appeals to teach a "meditation course", on the grounds that in the Sera Monastery tradition in which he was educated, "meditation" would be attempted only after intensive, multi-year study of the Five Topics. However, he gave Lama Zopa permission to lead what became the first of Kopan's meditation courses (then semiannual, now annual) in 1971. Lama Zopa led these courses at least through 1975, and sporadically thereafter.

During the early 1970s, hundreds of Westerners attended teachings at Kopan. Historical descriptions and recollections routinely characterize early Western participants as backpackers on the hippie trail (extended overland tours of Asia), to whom Lama Yeshe's style of discourse especially appealed.

Geoffrey Samuel finds it significant that Lamas Yeshe and Zopa had not yet attracted followings among the Tibetan or Himalayan peoples (Zopa's status as a minor tulku notwithstanding), and that their activities took place independently of any support or direction from the Central Tibetan Administration in Dharamsala. On his reading, their willingness to reach out to Westerners was in large measure the result of a lack of other sources of support. Nevertheless, Samuel sees their cultivation of an international network as having ample precedent in Tibet.

In December 1973, Lama Yeshe ordained fourteen Western monks and nuns under the name of the International Mahayana Institute. Around this time, Lama Yeshe's students began returning to their own countries. The result was the founding of an ever-increasing number of dharma centers in those countries. In his description of the FPMT, Jeffrey Paine emphasizes the charisma, intuition, drive, and organizational ability of Lama Yeshe. Paine asks us to consider how a refugee with neither financial resources nor language skills could manage to create an international network with more than a hundred centers and study groups. David N. Kay makes the following observation:

Lama Yeshe's project of defining and implementing an efficient organizational and administrative structure within the FPMT created the potential for friction at a local level. The organization's affiliated centers had initially been largely autonomous and self-regulating, but towards the late-1970s were increasingly subject to central management and control.

As a result, says Kay (and Samuel's analysis concurs), at the same time that the FPMT was consolidating its structure and practices, several local groups and teachers defected, founding independent networks. Geshe Loden of Australia's Chenrezig Institute left the FPMT in 1979, in order to focus on his own network of centers. More consequentially, Kelsang Gyatso and his students caused the Manjushri Institute, the FPMT's flagship center in England, to sever its FPMT ties. At issue was whether the centers and their students ought to identify primarily with Lama Yeshe, local teachers, the Gelugpa tradition, or Tibetan Buddhism as a whole. The FPMT now asks its lamas to sign a "Geshe Agreement" which makes explicit the organization's expectations. The latter rift widened in the wake of unrelated, post-1996 controversy over Dorje Shugden. Following the policy of the 14th Dalai Lama, the FPMT bans the worship of this deity from its centers.

Lama Yeshe's death in 1984 led to his succession as spiritual director by Lama Zopa. In 1986, a Spanish boy named Tenzin Ösel Hita (a.k.a. Tenzin Ösel Rinpoche, or "Lama Ösel") was identified as the tulku of Lama Yeshe. As he came of age, Hita gave up his robes for a secular life, attending university in Spain, and became relatively inactive in the FPMT. In 2009, Hita was quoted in several media sources as renouncing his role as a tulku—remarks which he later disavowed. In 2025, Hita published an open letter in which he observed that the FPMT board always saw him as someone "they needed to manage and control," and complained of a whispering campaign in which the board sought to marginalize his role in the organization, without giving him a chance to answer any accusations against him. He states that the FPMT has pressured him to enter a drug rehab (Hita insists that he does not use drugs), and cut off a monthly allowance that had been established by Lama Zopa.

On the 2023 death of Lama Zopa, the FPMT board indicated that he would have no direct successor, and that the board would collectively assume his responsibilities, subject to the advice of the Dalai Lama. An "advisory council of teachers" is planned.

In 2026, longtime FPMT CEO Roger Kunsang stepped down in favor of Peeyush Agarwal (under the new title of "executive director"), who however quickly resigned, having "developed a strong sense that he would be less effective in his new position than he and we [the FPMT board] had hoped." Roger Kunsang has returned as acting executive director.

=== Sexual Abuse Allegations ===
On 3 May 2019, Sera lama and FPMT teacher Dagri Rinpoche was arrested for groping a woman aboard a domestic Indian flight. A few days later, a group of nuns drew attention to additional complaints of groping, sexual harassment, and sexual assault by Dagri Rinpoche over a ten-year period, and called for the FPMT to arrange an independent, third-party investigation. A petition to this effect attracted more than 4000 signatures. The FPMT International Office responded by suspending Dagri Rinpoche from its list of teachers, and commissioning the FaithTrust Institute to conduct the requested investigation. Its 19 September 2020 report found the allegations credible. Five (out of eight) FPMT board members resigned amidst controversy over whether to release the report. A “draft” summary report was eventually published—so labeled by the FPMT in anticipation of revisions, but the FaithTrust Institute considered its work complete. Besides abuse, the summary also noted a pattern of "coercive or retaliatory behaviors" aimed at silencing complainants; criticized the FPMT for its lack of any clear mechanism to handle such complaints (pp. 38–39); and criticized statements by Lama Zopa which tended to "undermine" the investigation (pp. 11–13). (Zopa had characterized Dagri Rinpoche as “a very positive, holy being—definitely not an ordinary person," and advised Dagri's students to see only his pure qualities.) The FPMT objected that the FPMT centers where the abuse took place were legally independent; and that the report's criticism of Lama Zopa failed to take into account the core principle of guru devotion. FPMT center leaders and registered teachers (but not Tibetan teachers) are now required to take a "Protection from Abuse" online training course.

On 3 June 2026, the Portland alternative weekly Williamette Week published a pair of articles reporting on further allegations of sexual / spiritual abuse. The first concerned Madeleine Stafford, who in Nov. 2025 sued the FPMT (as well as its centers in North Carolina and Vermont) in the U.S. District Court for the Eastern District of North Carolina, on the grounds of "vicarious liability for assault, battery, and federal sex trafficking." Stafford, whom Lama Zopa had identified as a tulku, claims that Zopa's attendant, Sangpo Sherpa, and Dagri Rinpoche's attendant, Tenzin Gyaltsen, sexually abused her between the ages of ten and sixteen. Complaints to Zopa and his attendant, Roger Kunsang, proved fruitless; instead, the organization retaliated by firing Stafford's mother, an FPMT employee. The second story concerned Sunitha Bhaskaran, a former student of Yangsi Rinpoche—the president and spiritual director of the FPMT-affiliated Maitripa College, which shared space with the FPMT's Portland headquarters—whom she accused of abusing his authority as guru to coerce her into a five-year sexual relationship.The case was settled out of court. The Maitripa College and FPMT boards commissioned a third-party investigation by Carol Merchasin (whose report has not been released), and suspended Yangsi from teaching for either organization. The FPMT board has responded.

== Structure ==
The FPMT is headed by a board of directors, whose executive function is represented by the FPMT International Office. During their lives, Lama Yeshe and then Lama Zopa, as spiritual directors, were ex officio board members. Ven. Roger Kunsang served as president / CEO from 2005 to 2026, and was briefly succeeded by executive director Peeyush Agarwal (who resigned a few months later).

As of 2023, there are 138 FPMT dharma centres, projects, services and study groups in 34 countries. Each affiliated center, project or service is separately incorporated and locally financed. There is no such thing as FPMT "membership" for individuals; rather, membership is held only by organizations (although several of these offer their own, local membership to individuals). In addition to its local board and officers, each FPMT center also has a spiritual program coordinator and in many cases, a resident geshe or teacher (and perhaps other Sangha as well).

The center directors and spiritual program coordinators from various countries meet every few years as the Council for the Preservation for the Mahayana Tradition (CPMT), in order to share experience and deliberate points of mutual concern.

The 14th Dalai Lama is credited with the honorary role of "inspiration and guide".

Bei, Voulgarakis, and Nault use the FPMT to illustrate Arjun Appadurai's understanding of globalization in terms of (in Appadurai's words) "(a) ethnoscapes, (b) mediascapes, (c) technoscapes, (d) finanscapes, and (e) ideoscapes." The authors accordingly describe the FPMT as "an international network of Gelugpa dharma centers headquartered in Portland, Oregon, but founded by Tibetan and Sherpa monks in India and Nepal (one of whom has apparently reincarnated as a Spaniard), and whose funding comes disproportionately from ethnic Chinese communities in East / Southeast Asia."

== Programs ==
Students often first encounter the FPMT via short courses and retreats held at the various centers. The prototype of these is Kopan Monastery's annual month-long meditation course, offered since 1971. Many FPMT centers have adopted standardized curricula, whose modules may also be studied online. They range from short introductory courses like "Buddhist Meditation 101," to

- Discovering Buddhism, a two-year, fourteen-module lamrim course
- Living in the Path, a (so far) twenty-module course on practice, drawn from Lama Zopa's talks
- Exploring Buddhism, a (so far) seven-module course designed to prepare students for the Basic Program (vide infra)

Students desiring more advanced study have a number of options including:

- The FPMT Basic Program (five years, nine modules).
- The FPMT Masters Program (since 1998) -- 7 years traditional study using compressed version of the Geshe curriculum. Designed to produce credentialed FPMT teachers. Its courses are mainly—but not exclusively—hosted by the Istituto Lama Tzong Khapa in Pomaia, Italy, and Nalanda Monastery (France), and are also offered online.
- Maitripa College in Portland, Oregon (founded 2005, formal program began in 2006) -- 3-year MA (in Buddhist Studies) and M.Div. programs. The school intends to apply for regional accreditation.
- Lotsawa Rinchen Zangpo Translator Program (since 1996) -- 2 years intensive Tibetan language study in Dharamsala, followed by 2 years interpretation residency. Designed to train FPMT interpreters.

Students who complete any of the seven programs listed above may apply to become FPMT registered teachers.

== Projects ==
FPMT maintains a number of charitable projects, including funds to build holy objects; translate Tibetan texts; support monks and nuns (both Tibetan and non-Tibetan); offer medical care, food and other assistance in impoverished regions of Asia; re-establish Tibetan Buddhism in Mongolia; and protect animals.

Perhaps the highest-profile FPMT project to date is the Maitreya Project. Originally a planned colossal statue of Maitreya to be built in Bodhgaya and/or Kushinagar (India), the project has been reconceived in the face of fund-raising difficulties and controversy over land acquisition, and now intends to construct a number of relatively modest statues. Jessica Marie Falcone's Battling the Buddha of Love: A Cultural Biography of the Greatest Statue Never Built (Cornell University Press, 2018; based on her Ph.D. dissertation in cultural anthropology for Cornell) is about the controversy, and the meaning of the proposed statue to FPMT participants and Kushinagari protesters.

The Sera Je Food Fund offers three meals a day to the 2600 monks who are studying at Sera Je Monastery since 1991.

== Publications ==
Wisdom Publications, now a well-known publisher of Buddhist books, originated at Kopan Monastery, Kathmandu, Nepal, in 1975 under editor Nicholas Ribush. Its first publication was Lama Yeshe's and Lama Zopa's Wisdom Energy. Under Ribush, the publisher began formal operations in London in 1983 (after several years operating out of the Manjushri Institute), with Jeffrey Hopkins' Meditation on Emptiness (1983) as an early perennial. It moved to Boston in 1989, under director Timothy McNeill. The press offers both academic and popular Buddhist literature from all traditions of Buddhism, as well as translations of classic Buddhist literature. Especially noteworthy are its encyclopedia-style project, the 32-volume Library of Tibetan Classics (developed by Thupten Jinpa, English-language translator for the Dalai Lama); and the Teachings of the Buddha series of translations of the Pali Nikāyas.

JTK Publications (from 1976; the letters stand for "Je Tsong Khapa"), Diamant Verlag (from 1984) and éditions Mahayana (from 2020) publish Buddhist books in Italian, German, and French, respectively.

In 1983, the FPMT began publishing a glossy annual called Wisdom. In 1987 it was renamed Mandala and made biannual (and supplemented with newsletters). Between 1996 and 2008 it appeared bimonthly, then quarterly, until it ceased publication in 2021.

The Lama Yeshe Wisdom Archive, which holds copyright to the speeches and writings of Lama Yeshe and Lama Zopa, is one of the FPMT's member organizations. The LYWA archives and transcribes teachings by these and other lamas, and produces edited books for free distribution and for sale. Its director is Nicholas Ribush.

== Notable followers ==
- Nita Ing, Taiwanese CEO of Taiwan High Speed Rail (THSR)
- Lillian Too, Malaysian-Chinese author of 80 books on feng shui. She recounts the story of her contact with Lama Zopa and the FPMT in The Buddha Book (Element, 2003).
- Daja Wangchuk Meston, American Tibet activist and author of a memoir, Comes the Peace: My Journey to Forgiveness (Free Press, March 6, 2007). Meston grew up as a (white) boy monk at Kopan monastery—his mother having left him to become a Buddhist nun under Lama Yeshe. He took his own life in 2010.
- Jan Willis, professor of Religion at Wesleyan University and author of several Buddhist books including her memoir, Dreaming Me: An African American Woman's Spiritual Journey (Riverhead, 2001). Willis was one of the earliest students of Lama Yeshe, who reportedly encouraged her in her academic career.
- Gareth Sparham, British-born Tibetologist and translator of several Abhisamayalankara commentaries
- Thubten Gyatso (Adrian Feldmann), one of the first Westerners to become a Gelug monk
- Nick Ribush, an Australian ordained as a monk by Lama Yeshe, and the founder of several FPMT centers and projects

== Lawudo Gompa ==
Lawudo Gompa, part of the FPMT, is a meditation center and Buddhist monastery with a natural cave located in the Thame Valley of the Everest region. This place is reached after a four-hour rigorous trek from the famous Namche Bazaar, the gateway to the Mt. Everest Base Camp. Lama Kunzang Yeshe the chief Sherpa Buddhist monk from Thame Monastery, is believed to have meditated here in solitude in the early 20th century at Lawudo. Kunzang Yeshe was called the Lawudo Lama due to his connection to the cave there. According to Buddhist belief, Lama Kunzang Yeshe's reincarnation was born as Lama Zopa in 1946, also in Thame village. Lawudo was co-founded by Lama Zopa (1946-2023), a famous Buddhist teacher. The place where he meditated in solitude was transformed into an attractive monastery under the guidance of Lama Zopa himself. After the construction of a monastery in Lawudo with facilities for studying, meditating, and living, the number of people going there to meditate and make pilgrimages has increased. To reach Lawudo, people can do a day's trek.

== See also ==
- Kopan Monastery
- Tara Institute
- Maitreya Project
- Lama Yeshe
- Lama Zopa
- Osel Hita Torres
