= Kopan Monastery =

Tibetan Buddhist monastery near Kathmandu, Nepal

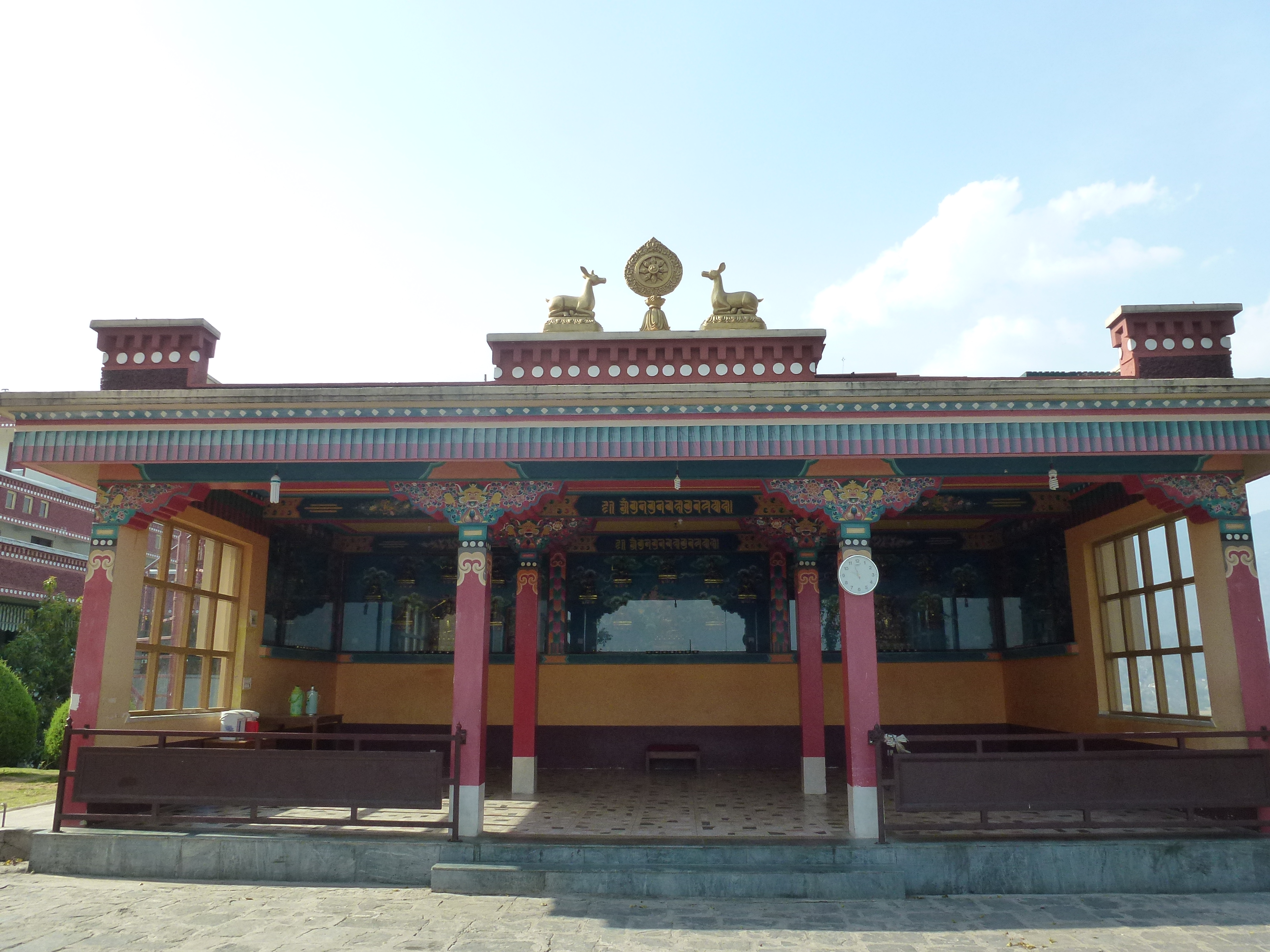
- Debate hall at Kopan Monastery.

- Location within Nepal

Religion
- Affiliation: Tibetan Buddhism
- Sect: Gelug
- Leadership: Thubten Zopa Rinpoche

Location
- Location: Budhanilkantha Municipality, Kathmandu
- Country: Nepal
- Interactive map of Kopan Monastery
- Coordinates: 27°44′32″N 85°21′51″E

Architecture
- Founder: Thubten Yeshe and Thubten Zopa Rinpoche
- Established: 1969

Kopan Monastery is a Tibetan Buddhist monastery near Boudhanath, on the outskirts of Kathmandu, Nepal. It is a member of the Foundation for the Preservation of the Mahayana Tradition (FPMT), an international network of Gelugpa dharma centers, and once served as its headquarters.

The monastery was established by the FPMT's founders, Lamas Thubten Yeshe and Thubten Zopa Rinpoche, who bought the property from Nepal's royal astrologer in 1969. Its name comes from the name of the hill on which it was built.

Kopan has become especially famous for teaching Buddhism to visiting Westerners. The first of what would become annual month-long (November–December) meditation courses was held in 1971. These courses generally combine traditional Lam Rim teachings with informal discussion, several periods of guided meditation, and a vegetarian diet.

Kopan now encompasses two separate institutions: the monastery, atop Kopan Hill, and the nearby Khachoe Ghakyil Ling Nunnery (known as the Kopan Nunnery). The nunnery was established in 1979 by Lama Yeshe to provide spiritual and practical education modeled on that received by the monks. In 2009 the nunnery began raising money to expand its housing and education capacity, which has grown from 4 to 400 in less than 35 years, using such sites as GoFundMe.

Kopan Monastery has also recently become a popular recreational destination for Kathmandu residents and tourists.

== See also ==
- Geshe Lhundrup Rigsel
