= Dharma centre =

Non-monastic Buddhist centre in a community

A Dharma Centre (Sanskrit) or Dhamma Centre (Pali) is a non-monastic Buddhist centre in a community.

According to the Foundation for the Preservation of the Mahayana Tradition, the function of these centres is to preserve and spread the teachings of Buddhism. Many of the larger centres have lay residents. According to the New Kadampa Tradition, dharma centres provide the focus of a local Buddhist community and provide facilities for study, practice and living by moral precepts.
