= Thubten Zopa Rinpoche =

Tibetan Buddhist lama (1945–2023)

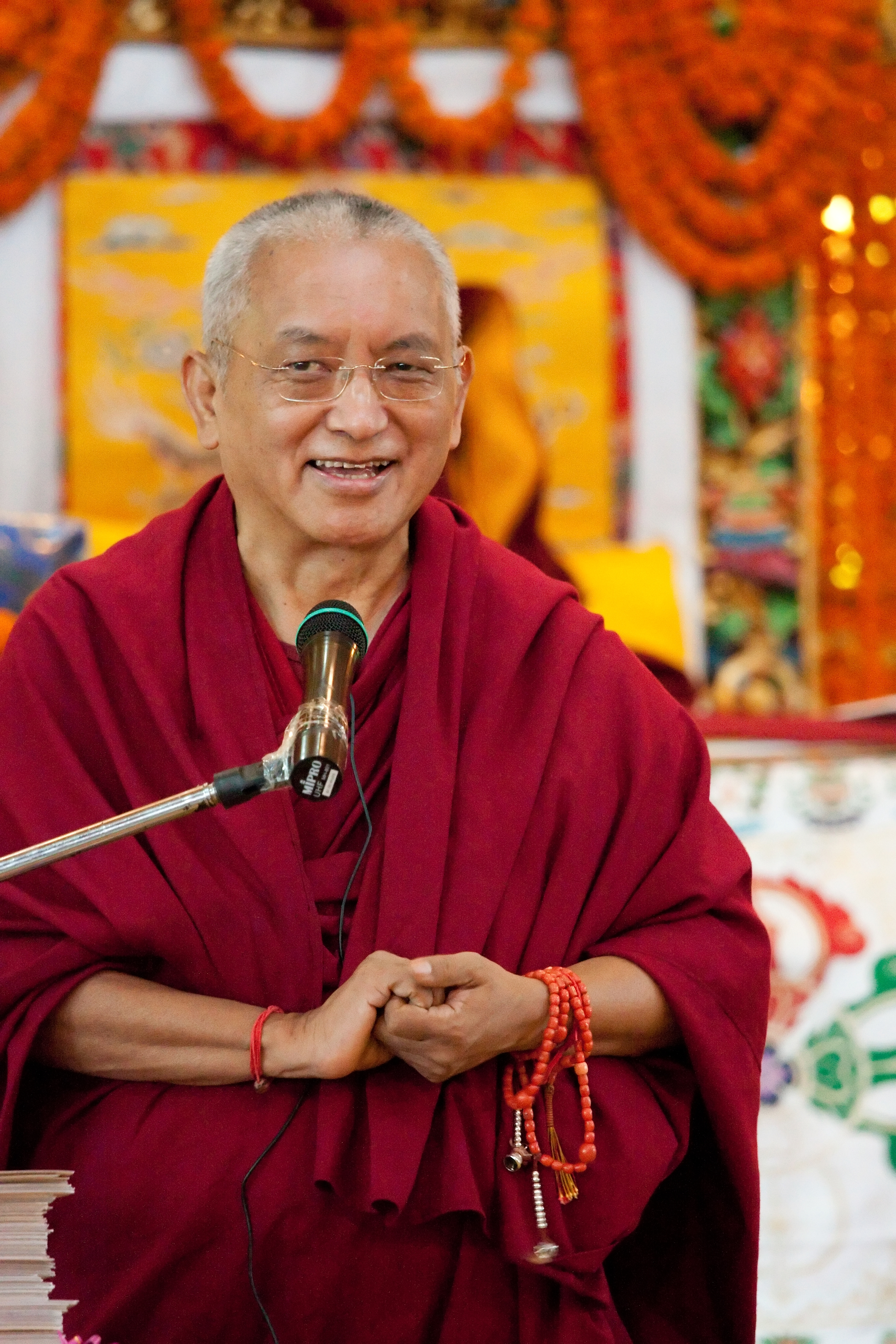
- Thubten Zopa Rinpoche in 2008
- Born: Dawa Chötar; 3 December 1945; Thangme, Nepal
- Died: 13 April 2023 (aged 77); Kathmandu, Nepal

Philosophical work
- Region: Tibetan Buddhism
- School: Gelug
- Website: fpmt.org/teachers/zopa/

Thubten Zopa Rinpoche (Tibetan: ཐུབ་བསྟན་བཟོད་པ་, Wylie: Thub-bstan Bzod-pa; born Dawa Chötar, 3 December 1945 – 13 April 2023) was a Tibetan Buddhist lama in the Gelug school. He is known for founding the Foundation for the Preservation of the Mahayana Tradition and Maitripa College in Portland, Oregon.

== Biography ==
Thubten Zopa Rinpoche, also called Lama Zopa Rinpoche has an extensive biography of him in the book The Lawudo Lama by Jamyang Wangmo.

Lama Zopa Rinpoche was born in Thangme, Nepal, in 1945. Early in life, he was recognized as the reincarnation of the Lawudo Lama Kunzang Yeshe, from the same region (hence the title "Rinpoche"). At the age of ten, he went to Tibet and studied and meditated at Domo Geshe Rinpoche's monastery near Pagri. He took his monastic vows at Dungkar Monastery in Tibet.

Lama Zopa Rinpoche left Tibet in 1959 for Bhutan after the Chinese occupation of Tibet. Lama Zopa Rinpoche then went to the Tibetan refugee camp at Buxa Duar, West Bengal, India, where he met Lama Yeshe, who became his closest teacher. The Lamas met their first Western student, Zina Rachevsky, in 1967 then traveled with her to Nepal in 1968 where they began teaching more Westerners.

Lama Zopa met Choekyi Gyaltsen, 10th Panchen Lama, in Nepal in 1986 and in Tibet.

Lama Zopa is most noteworthy as the co-founder, with Lama Thubten Yeshe, of Kopan Monastery and the Foundation for the Preservation of the Mahayana Tradition (FPMT). In 1972 he along with Lama Yeshe founded Tushita Meditation Centre near McLeod Ganj at village Dharamkot in Himachal Pradesh. After the death of Lama Yeshe in 1984, Lama Zopa served as the FPMT's spiritual director. The FPMT is involved with a number of charitable activities including "offering food to ordained Sangha; providing scholarships to study Buddhist philosophy; offering to the main teachers of the Lama Tsongkhapa tradition and sponsoring annual debates; offering grants for social services such as to old age homes, schools, hospitals and monastic institutions; providing comprehensive Dharma programs; translating Dharma texts; sponsoring holy objects: statues, stupas and prayer wheels, and saving animals."

== Death ==
From 10 April 2023, Lama Zopa Rinpoche stayed up in the mountains in the Tsum Valley. Due to altitude sickness he had to be brought down urgently. On arrival back in Kathmandu, Rinpoche stopped breathing. The main doctor at Karuna Hospital tried for some time to revive him, but was not successful. Rinpoche died at about 9:30 am Nepal time, 13 April 2023, at the age of 76.

== Teachings ==
Lama Zopa Rinpoche's books are published by Wisdom Publications and Lama Yeshe Wisdom Archive. Free transcripts of some of his teachings are available from the Lama Yeshe Wisdom Archive.

Lama Zopa Rinpoche offered spiritual advice on a range of topics to students, many of which are available on the FPMT and LYWA websites.

== Lineage ==
Lama Zopa Rinpoche was a Gelugpa lineage holder, having received teachings from many of the great Gelugpa masters. His Root Guru is HH Trijang Lobsang Yeshe Tenzin Gyatso since he was a young boy studying in Buxa, India. Lama Zopa Rinpoche was a devoted student of the 14th Dalai Lama and has outlined that offering service to the Dalai Lama as much as possible and to be able to fulfill his wishes is the highest priority for the FPMT organization.

== Published books ==
Lama Zopa Rinpoche has a number of books published by Wisdom Publications and Lama Yeshe Wisdom Archive including the following titles:

- How To Enjoy Death: Preparing to Meet Life's Final Challenge without Fear
- The Four Noble Truths: A Guide to Everyday Life
- Bodhichitta: Practice for a Meaningful Life
- Dear Lama Zopa: Radical Solutions for Transforming Problems into Happiness
- Ultimate Healing
- The Door to Satisfaction
- Transforming Problems Into Happiness
- The Heart of the Path Book: Seeing the Guru as Buddha
- Teachings From the Medicine Buddha Retreat Book
- Sun of Devotion, Stream of Blessings Book
- How Things Exist: Teachings on Emptiness

== See also ==
- Thubten Yeshe
- Geshe Lhundrup Rigsel
- Foundation for the Preservation of the Mahayana Tradition
