= Thubten Yeshe =

Tibetan Buddhist monk

Personal life
- Born: 1935 Tolung Dechen, Tibet
- Died: March 3, 1984 (aged 48–49) Los Angeles, California, U.S.
- Education: Sera Monastery

Religious life
- Religion: Tibetan Buddhism
- School: Gelugpa

Senior posting
- Based in: Kopan Monastery; Foundation for the Preservation of the Mahayana Tradition

Thubten Yeshe (1935–1984) was a Tibetan lama who, while exiled in Nepal, co-founded Kopan Monastery (1969) and the Foundation for the Preservation of the Mahayana Tradition (1975). He followed the Gelug tradition, and was considered unconventional in his teaching style.

Lama Yeshe was born near the Tibetan town of Tolung Dechen, and was sent to Sera Monastery in Lhasa at the age of six. He received full ordination at the age of 28 from Kyabje Ling Rinpoche. Jeffrey Paine reports that Lama Yeshe deliberately refused to complete his geshe degree, despite having studied for it:

Many years later, when pressed why he had shunned this prestigious degree, he would laugh: "And be Geshe Yeshe?"

== Teaching Western students ==
In 1959, Lama Yeshe travelled to Bhutan, and then to the Tibetan refugee camp at Buxaduar, India. There, his teacher Geshe Rabten entrusted to his care a younger monk, Thubten Zopa Rinpoche. The two would work together throughout Lama Yeshe's life.

In 1965, Lama Yeshe began teaching Western students, beginning with Zina Rachevsky, who sought him out at the Ghum Monastery in Darjeeling. The number of students continued to grow, eventually resulting in the founding of the several institutions mentioned above. At this time, the Tibetan religious community considered the teaching of Westerners to be undesirable. Paine reports criticism from other Tibetans calling Lama Yeshe a "paisa lama," i.e., one interested primarily in money.

Between 1977 and 1978, Lama Yeshe taught at University of California Santa Cruz. There he taught one class, "Tibetan Buddhism", appropriately. During that time, he also attended courses at the University in Western Philosophy.

Thubten Yeshe and his main student, Thubten Zopa Rinpoche, founded Kopan Monastery in Kathmandu, Nepal for the western seekers in the 1960s. The first annual ‘One-Month Meditation Course’ was held there in November 1971. Responding to the growing demand from their Western students, the lamas decided to open a sister centre to be used for retreats. In 1972, along with a few of their Western students, Lamas Yeshe and Zopa bought an old colonial house on a hill above McLeod Ganj in Dharamkot in Himachal Pradesh, and Tushita Meditation Centre was founded.

== Personal life ==
In 1974 Lama Yeshe entered into a celibate marriage with an Australian disciple, apparently for the purpose of obtaining an Australian passport which, it was thought, might have allowed him to visit Tibet. His intended journey took place in 1982.

== Death and reincarnation ==
Lama Yeshe died 20 minutes before dawn on the first day of Losar, the Tibetan New Year, and was cremated at the Vajrapani Institute in Boulder Creek, California, where there is a stupa honoring him.

In 1986 his reincarnation was identified in the person of a Spanish boy, Ösel Hita Torres, who is now known as Tenzin Ösel Hita (b. 1985). This makes Yeshe the first in a line of tulkus. After spending his childhood and youth in Nepal receiving a traditional education for a Gelugpa tulku, Ösel subsequently chose to attend a western secondary boarding school in Canada and is currently a filmmaker in Spain.

== Bibliography ==
A number of books have been compiled from Lama Yeshe's lectures. His books include Introduction to Tantra, Wisdom Energy, The Bliss of Inner Fire, Becoming Vajrasattva: The Tantric Path of Purification, When the Chocolate Runs Out, and Becoming the Compassion Buddha, all of which are available from Wisdom Publications. In 2020 the Lama Yeshe Wisdom Archive published an extensive biography of Lama Yeshe written by Adele Hulse. The LYWA also has many free books of Lama Yeshe's (and Lama Zopa Rinpoche's) teachings, which are also available as ebooks. The Archive also has several DVDs of Lama Yeshe's talks and teachings, maintains an active presence on social media (Facebook, Twitter, Instagram etc.), publishes a free monthly eletter of which more than 200 back issues are available, and offers a free monthly podcast and many free videos on its YouTube channel.

== Bibliography ==
- The Foundation for the Preservation of the Mahayana Tradition. A Joint Biography of Lama Yeshe and Lama Zopa Rinpoche 1935 to 1974.
- Paine, Jeffrey. Re-Enchantment: Tibetan Buddhism Comes to the West. Norton, 2004. Chapter two discusses the influence of Lama Yeshe and the FPMT.
- Willis, Jan. Dreaming Me . Lama Yeshe was her teacher. She talks a lot about him in this book.
