= 14th Dalai Lama =

Spiritual leader of Tibet since 1940

14th Dalai Lama, Tenzin Gyatso
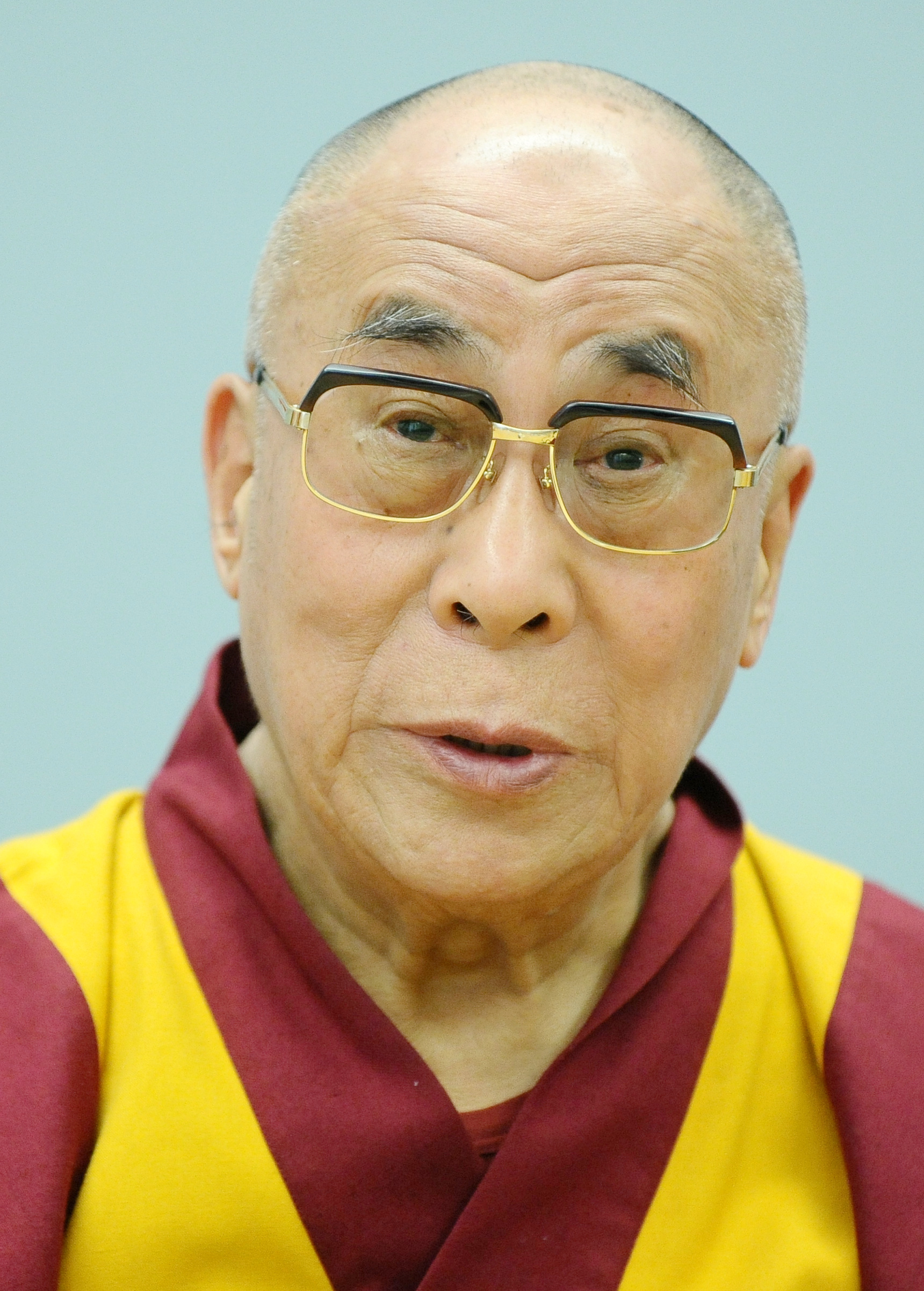
- The Dalai Lama in 2013

14th Dalai Lama
- Reign: 22 February 1940 – present
- Predecessor: 13th Dalai Lama, Thubten Gyatso
- Regent: 5th Reting Rinpoche, Jamphel Yeshe Gyaltsen (1934–1941); 3rd Taktra Rinpoche (1941–1950)

Head of State of Tibet
- In office: 17 November 1950 – 24 October 1951

Vice Chairperson of the Standing Committee of the National People's Congress
- In office: 27 September 1954 – 3 January 1965

Director of the Preparatory Committee for the Tibet Autonomous Region
- In office: 1956–1959
- Successor: Choekyi Gyaltsen, 10th Panchen Lama (acting)

Head of the Tibetan government-in-exile
- Reign: 1959 – May 2011
- Successor: Political authority transferred to the office of the Sikyong
- Born: Lhamo Thondup; 6 July 1935 (age 91); Taktser, Amdo
Names
- Lhamo Thondup
- Father: Choekyong Tsering
- Mother: Diki Tsering
- Religion: Tibetan Buddhism, Gelug school

The 14th Dalai Lama (Note: US: /ˈdɑːlaɪ ˈlɑːmə/, UK: /ˈdælaɪ ˈlɑːmə/) (born Lhamo Thondup, (Note: Tibetan: ལྷ་མོ་དོན་འགྲུབ།, Wylie: Lha-mo Don-'grub, ZWPY: Lhamo Tönzhub, Lhasa dialect: [ˈl̥a̰ˌmo ˈtʰø̃ˌɖup]; simplified Chinese: 拉莫顿珠; traditional Chinese: 拉莫頓珠; pinyin: Lāmò Dùnzhū) 6 July 1935; full spiritual name: Jetsun Jamphel Ngawang Lobsang Yeshe Tenzin Gyatso, shortened as Tenzin Gyatso) (Note: Tibetan: བསྟན་འཛིན་རྒྱ་མཚོ, Wylie: Bstan-'dzin Rgya-mtsho) is the current Dalai Lama, the highest spiritual leader and head of Tibetan Buddhism. He served as the resident spiritual and temporal leader of Tibet before 1959, and subsequently led the Tibetan government in exile represented by the Central Tibetan Administration in Dharamshala, India.

A belief central to the Tibetan Buddhist tradition as well as the institution of the Dalai Lama is that the reincarnated person is a living Bodhisattva, specifically an emanation of Avalokiteśvara (in Sanskrit) or Chenrezig (in Tibetan), the Bodhisattva of Compassion. The Mongolic word dalai means ocean. (Note: The name is part of the full title 圣识一切瓦齐尔达喇达赖喇嘛 (Holy Omniscient Vajradhara Dalai Lama) given by Altan Khan, a ruler of the Tumed Mongol tribe and king under the Ming dynasty of China.) The 14th Dalai Lama is also known to Tibetans as Gyalwa Rinpoche ("The Precious Jewel-like Buddha-Master"), Kundun ("The Presence"), and Yizhin Norbu ("The Wish-Fulfilling Gem"). His devotees, as well as much of the Western world, often call him His Holiness the Dalai Lama. He is the leader and a monk of the newest Gelug school of Tibetan Buddhism.

The 14th Dalai Lama was born to a farming family in Taktser (Hongya village), in the traditional Tibetan region of Amdo, at the time a Chinese frontier district. He was selected as the tulku of the 13th Dalai Lama in 1937, and formally recognised as the 14th Dalai Lama in 1939. As with the recognition process for his predecessor, a Golden Urn selection process was waived and approved by the Nationalist government of China. His enthronement ceremony was held in Lhasa on 22 February 1940. Following the Battle of Chamdo, in which PRC forces annexed Central Tibet, the Tibetan government, the Ganden Phodrang, invested the Dalai Lama with temporal duties on 17 November 1950 (at 15 years of age), which he held until his exile in 1959.

During the 1959 Tibetan uprising, the Dalai Lama escaped to India, where he continues to live. On 29 April 1959, the Dalai Lama established the independent Tibetan government in exile in the north Indian hill station of Mussoorie, which then moved in May 1960 to Dharamshala, where he resides. He retired as political head in 2011 to make way for a democratic government, the Central Tibetan Administration. The Dalai Lama advocates for the welfare of Tibetans and since the early 1970s has called for the Middle Way Approach with China to peacefully resolve the issue of Tibet. This policy, adopted democratically by the Central Tibetan Administration and the Tibetan people through long discussions, seeks to find a middle ground, "a practical approach and mutually beneficial to both Tibetans and Chinese, in which Tibetans can preserve their culture and religion and uphold their identity", and China's assertion of sovereignty over Tibet, aiming to address the interests of both parties through dialogue and communication and for Tibet to remain a part of China. He criticised the CIA Tibetan program, saying that its sudden end in 1972 proved it was primarily aimed at serving American interests.

Up until his mid-80s, the Dalai Lama travelled worldwide to give Tibetan Mahayana and Vajrayana Buddhism teachings, and his Kalachakra teachings and initiations were international events. He also attended conferences on a wide range of subjects, including the relationship between religion and science, met with other world leaders, religious leaders, philosophers, and scientists, online and in-person. Since 2018, he has continued to teach on a reduced schedule, limiting his travel to within India only, and occasionally addressing international audiences via live webcasts. His work includes focus on the environment, economics, women's rights, nonviolence, interfaith dialogue, physics, astronomy, Buddhism and science, cognitive neuroscience, reproductive health and sexuality.

The Dalai Lama was awarded the Nobel Peace Prize in 1989. Time magazine named the Dalai Lama Gandhi's spiritual heir to nonviolence. The 12th General Assembly of the Asian Buddhist Conference for Peace in New Delhi unanimously recognised the Dalai Lama's contributions to global peace, his lifelong efforts in uniting Buddhist communities worldwide, and bestowed upon him the title of "Universal Supreme Leader of the Buddhist World"; they also designated 6 July, his birthday, as the Universal Day of Compassion. In addition, an Indian MP delegation led by Sujeet Kumar has advocated for the Dalai Lama to receive the Bharat Ratna, the highest civilian honour in India.

== Early life and background ==
Lhamo Thondup was born on 6 July 1935, to Choekyong Tsering and his wife Dekyi Tsering, a farming and horse trading family in the small hamlet of Taktser (Note: Chinese: 红崖村; pinyin: Hóngyá Cūn; lit. 'Redcliff Village') under the control of the Ma clique loyal to the Republic of China as part of Qinghai and on the edge of the traditionally Tibetan region of Amdo. He was one of seven siblings to survive childhood and one of the three supposed reincarnated Rinpoches in the same family. His eldest sister, Tsering Dolma, was 16 years his senior and was midwife to his mother at his birth. She would accompany him into exile and founded Tibetan Children's Villages. His eldest brother, Thupten Jigme Norbu, had been recognised at the age of three by the 13th Dalai Lama as the reincarnation of the high Lama, the 6th Taktser Rinpoche. His fifth brother, Tendzin Choegyal, had been recognised as the 16th Ngari Rinpoche. His sister, Jetsun Pema, spent most of her adult life on the Tibetan Children's Villages project. The Dalai Lama has said that his first language was "a broken Xining language which was (a dialect of) the Chinese language, a form of Central Plains Mandarin", and his family speaks neither Amdo Tibetan nor Lhasa Tibetan.

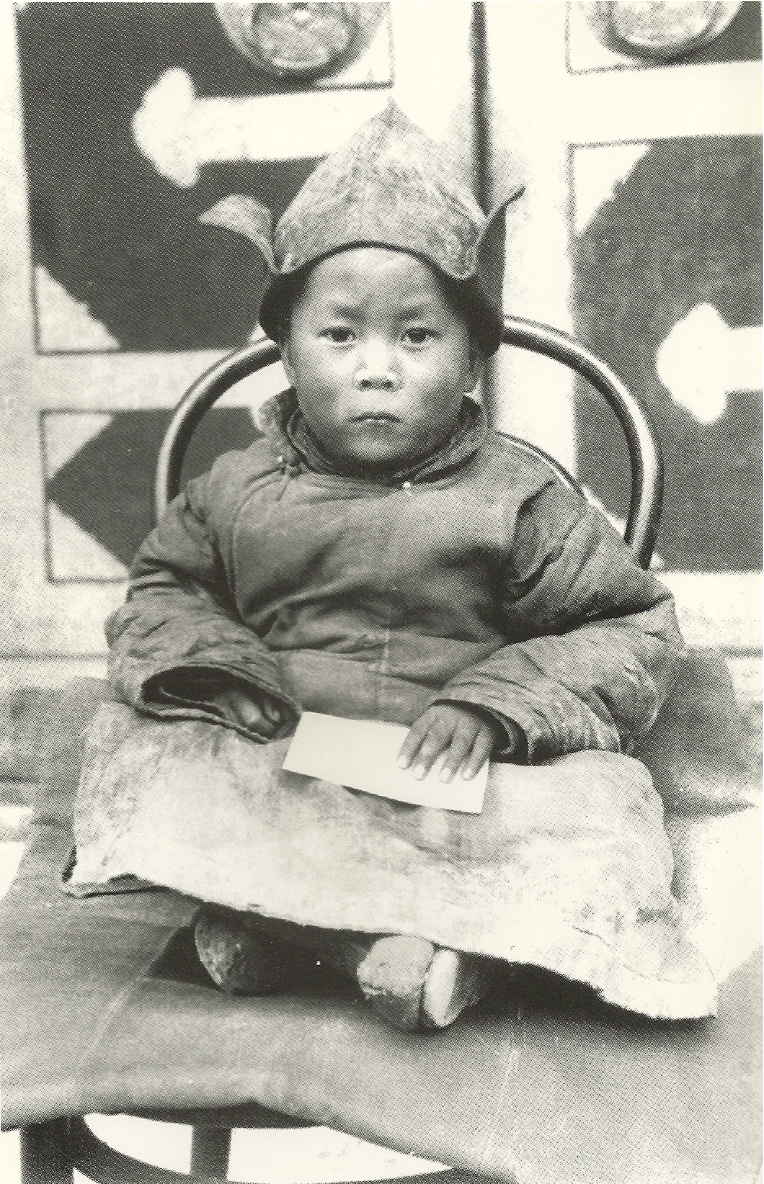
The Dalai Lama as a child

After the demise of the 13th Dalai Lama, in 1935, the Ordinance of Lama Temple Management (Note: Chinese: 管理喇嘛寺廟條例) was published by the Central Government. In 1936, the Method of Reincarnation of Lamas (Note: Chinese: 喇嘛轉世辦法) was published by the Mongolian and Tibetan Affairs Commission of the Central Government. Article 3 states that death of lamas, including the Dalai Lama and Panchen Lama, should be reported to the commission, soul boys should be located and checked by the commission, and a lot-drawing ceremony with the Golden Urn system should be held. Article 6 states that local governments should invite officials from the Central Government to take care of the sitting-in-the-bed ceremony. Article 7 states that soul boys should not be sought from current lama families. This article echoes what the Qianlong Emperor described in The Discourse of Lama to eliminate greedy families with multiple reincarnated rinpoches, lamas. Based on custom and regulation, the regent was actively involved in the search for the reincarnation of the Dalai Lama.

Following reported signs and visions, three search teams were sent out to the north-east, the east, and the south-east to locate the new incarnation when the boy who was to become the 14th Dalai Lama was about two years old. Sir Basil Gould, British delegate to Lhasa in 1936, related his account of the north-eastern team to Sir Charles Alfred Bell, former British resident in Lhasa and friend of the 13th Dalai Lama. Among other omens, the head of the embalmed body of the 13th Dalai Lama, at first facing south-east, had turned to face the north-east, indicating, it was interpreted, the direction in which his successor would be found. The Regent, Reting Rinpoche, shortly afterwards had a vision at the sacred lake of Lhamo La-tso which he interpreted as Amdo being the region to search. This vision was also interpreted to refer to a large monastery with a gilded roof and turquoise tiles, and a twisting path from there to a hill to the east, opposite which stood a small house with distinctive eaves. The team, led by Kewtsang Rinpoche, went first to meet the Panchen Lama, who had been stuck in Jyekundo, in northern Kham.

The Panchen Lama had been investigating births of unusual children in the area ever since the death of the 13th Dalai Lama. He gave Kewtsang the names of three boys whom he had discovered and identified as candidates. Within a year the Panchen Lama had died. Two of his three candidates were crossed off the list but the third, a "fearless" child, the most promising, was from Taktser village, which, as in the vision, was on a hill, at the end of a trail leading to Taktser from the great Kumbum Monastery with its gilded, turquoise roof. There they found a house, as interpreted from the vision—the house where Lhamo Dhondup lived.

The 14th Dalai Lama claims that at the time, the village of Taktser stood right on the "real border" between the region of Amdo and China. According to the search lore, when the team visited, posing as pilgrims, its leader, a Sera Lama, pretended to be the servant and sat separately in the kitchen. He held an old mala that had belonged to the 13th Dalai Lama, and the boy Lhamo Dhondup, aged two, approached and asked for it. The monk said, "If you know who I am, you can have it." The child said, "Sera Lama, Sera Lama", and spoke with him in a Lhasa accent, in a dialect the boy's mother could not understand. The next time the party returned to the house, they revealed their real purpose and asked permission to subject the boy to certain tests. One test consisted of showing him various pairs of objects, one of which had belonged to the 13th Dalai Lama and one which had not. In every case, he chose the Dalai Lama's own objects and rejected the others.

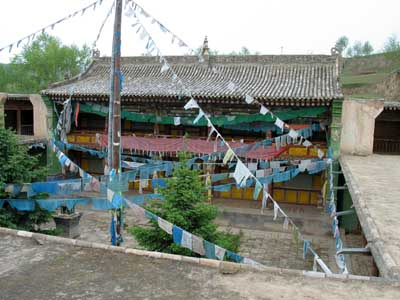
House where the 14th Dalai Lama was born in Taktser, Amdo

From 1936 the Hui "Ma clique" Muslim warlord Ma Bufang ruled Qinghai as its governor under the nominal authority of the Republic of China central government. According to an interview with the 14th Dalai Lama, in the 1930s, Ma Bufang had seized this north-east corner of Amdo in the name of Chiang Kai-shek's weak government and incorporated it into the Chinese province of Qinghai. Before going to Taktser, Kewtsang had gone to Ma Bufang to pay his respects. When Ma Bufang heard a candidate had been found in Taktser, he had the family brought to him in Xining. He first demanded proof that the boy was the Dalai Lama, but the Lhasa government, though informed by Kewtsang that this was the one, told Kewtsang to say he had to go to Lhasa for further tests with other candidates. They knew that if he was declared to be the Dalai Lama, the Chinese government would insist on sending a large army escort with him, which would then stay in Lhasa and refuse to budge.

Ma Bufang, together with Kumbum Monastery, then refused to allow him to depart unless he was declared to be the Dalai Lama, but withdrew this demand in return for 100,000 Chinese dollars ransom in silver to be shared among them, to let them go to Lhasa. Kewtsang managed to raise this, but the family was only allowed to move from Xining to Kumbum when a further demand was made for another 330,000 dollars ransom: 100,000 each for government officials, the commander-in-chief, and the Kumbum Monastery; 20,000 for the escort; and only 10,000 for Ma Bufang himself, he said.

Two years of diplomatic wrangling followed before it was accepted by Lhasa that the ransom had to be paid to avoid the Chinese getting involved and escorting him to Lhasa with a large army. Meanwhile, the boy was kept at Kumbum where two of his brothers were already studying as monks and recognised incarnate lamas. The payment of 300,000 silver dollars was then advanced by Muslim traders en route to Mecca in a large caravan via Lhasa. They paid Ma Bufang on behalf of the Tibetan government against promissory notes to be redeemed, with interest, in Lhasa. The 20,000-dollar fee for an escort was dropped, since the Muslim merchants invited them to join their caravan for protection; Ma Bufang sent 20 of his soldiers with them and was paid from both sides since the Chinese government granted him another 50,000 dollars for the expenses of the journey. Furthermore, the Indian government helped the Tibetans raise the ransom funds by affording them import concessions.

On 22 September 1938, representatives of Tibet Office in Beijing informed Mongolian and Tibetan Affairs Commission that 3 candidates were found and ceremony of Golden Urn would be held in Tibet.

In October 1938, the Method of Using Golden Urn for the 14th Dalai Lama was drafted by Mongolian and Tibetan Affairs Commission.

On 12 December 1938, regent Jamphel Yeshe Gyaltsen, the serving Reting Rinpoche, informed the Mongolian and Tibetan Affairs Commission that three candidates were found and ceremony of Golden Urn would be held.

Released from Kumbum, on 21 July 1939 the party travelled across Tibet on a journey to Lhasa in the large Muslim caravan with Lhamo Dhondup, now four years old, riding with his brother Lobsang in a special palanquin carried by two mules, two years after being discovered. As soon as they were out of Ma Bufang's area, he was officially declared to be the 14th Dalai Lama by the Kashag, and after ten weeks of travel he arrived in Lhasa on 8 October 1939. The ordination (pabbajja) and giving of the monastic name of Tenzin Gyatso were arranged by Reting Rinpoche and according to the Dalai Lama "I received my ordination from Kyabjé Ling Rinpoché in the Jokhang in Lhasa." There was very limited Chinese involvement at this time. The family of the 14th Dalai Lama was elevated to the highest stratum of the Tibetan aristocracy and acquired land and serf holdings, as with the families of previous Dalai Lamas.

In 1959, at the age of 23, he took his final examination at Lhasa's Jokhang Temple during the annual Monlam Prayer Festival. (Note: It has been noted that two of the examining debate partners of the 14th Dalai Lama were Kyabje Choden Rinpoche of Sera monastery (Jey College), who debated with him on the topic of the two truths doctrine (Wylie: bden pa gnyis,) and Khyongla Rato Rinpoche.) He passed with honours and was awarded the Lharampa degree, the highest-level geshe degree, roughly equivalent to a doctorate in Buddhist philosophy.

According to the Dalai Lama, he had a succession of tutors in Tibet including Reting Rinpoche, Tathag Rinpoche, Ling Rinpoche and lastly Trijang Rinpoche, who became junior tutor when he was 19. At the age of 11 he met the Austrian mountaineer Heinrich Harrer, who became his videographer and tutor about the world outside Lhasa. The two remained friends until Harrer's death in 2006.

== Life as the Dalai Lama ==
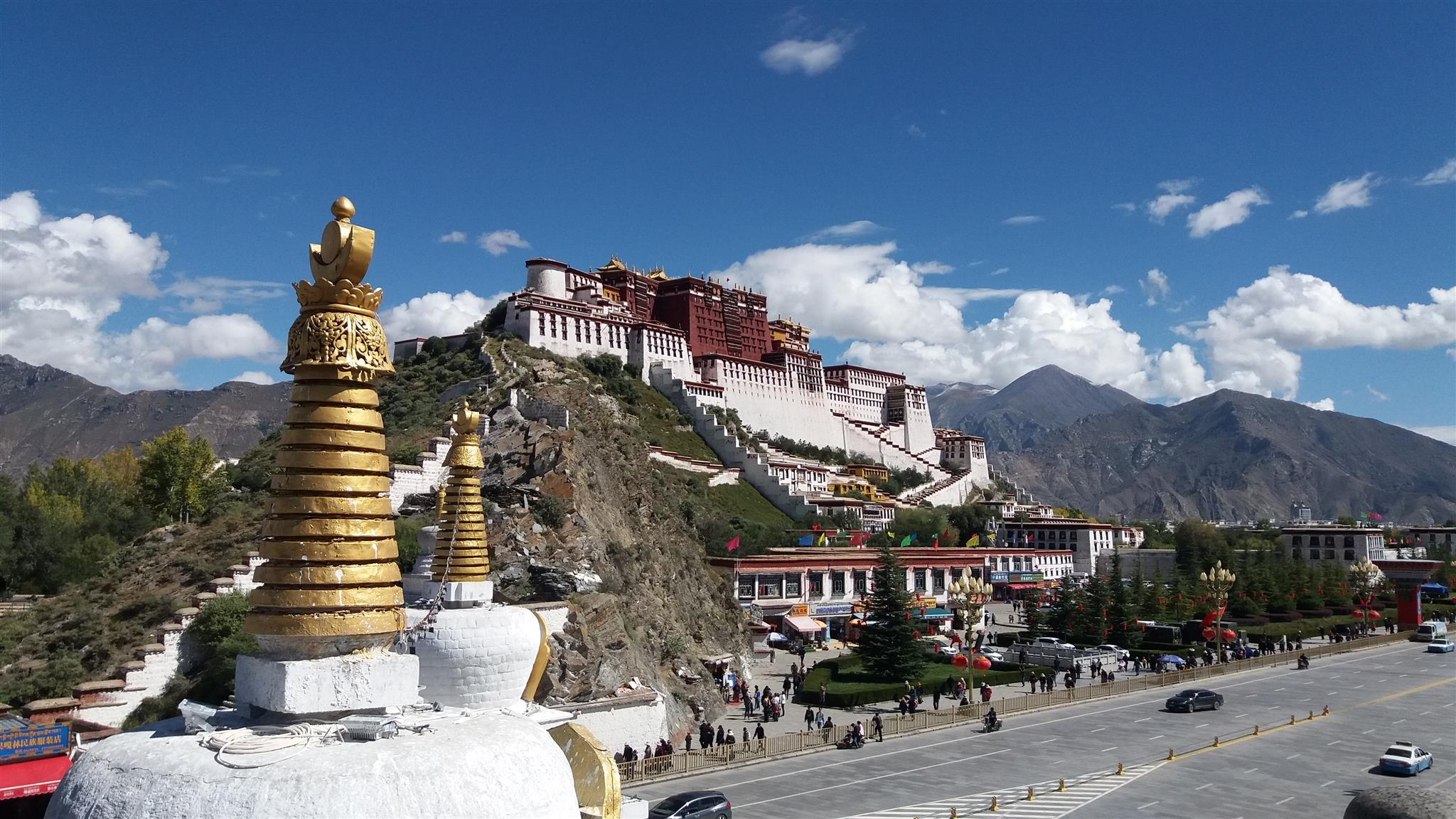
Lhasa's Potala Palace, today a UNESCO World Heritage Site, 2019

Historically the Dalai Lamas or their regents held political and religious leadership over Tibet from Lhasa with varying degrees of influence depending on the regions of Tibet and periods of history. This began with the 5th Dalai Lama's rule in 1642 and lasted until the 1950s (except for 1705–1750), during which period the Dalai Lamas headed the Tibetan government or Ganden Phodrang. Until 1912 however, when the 13th Dalai Lama declared the complete independence of Tibet, their rule was generally subject to patronage and protection of firstly Mongol kings (1642–1720) and then the Manchu-led Qing dynasty (1720–1912).

During the Dalai Lama's recognition process, the cultural anthropologist Melvyn Goldstein writes that "everything the Tibetans did during the selection process was designed to prevent China from playing any role."

Afterwards in 1939, at the age of four, the Dalai Lama was taken in a procession of lamas to Lhasa. Former British officials stationed in India and Tibet recalled that envoys from Britain and China were present at the Dalai Lama's enthronement in February 1940. According to Basil Gould, the Chinese representative Wu Chunghsin was reportedly unhappy about the position he had during the ceremony. Afterward an article appeared in the Chinese press falsely claiming that Wu personally announced the installation of the Dalai Lama, who supposedly prostrated himself to Wu in gratitude.

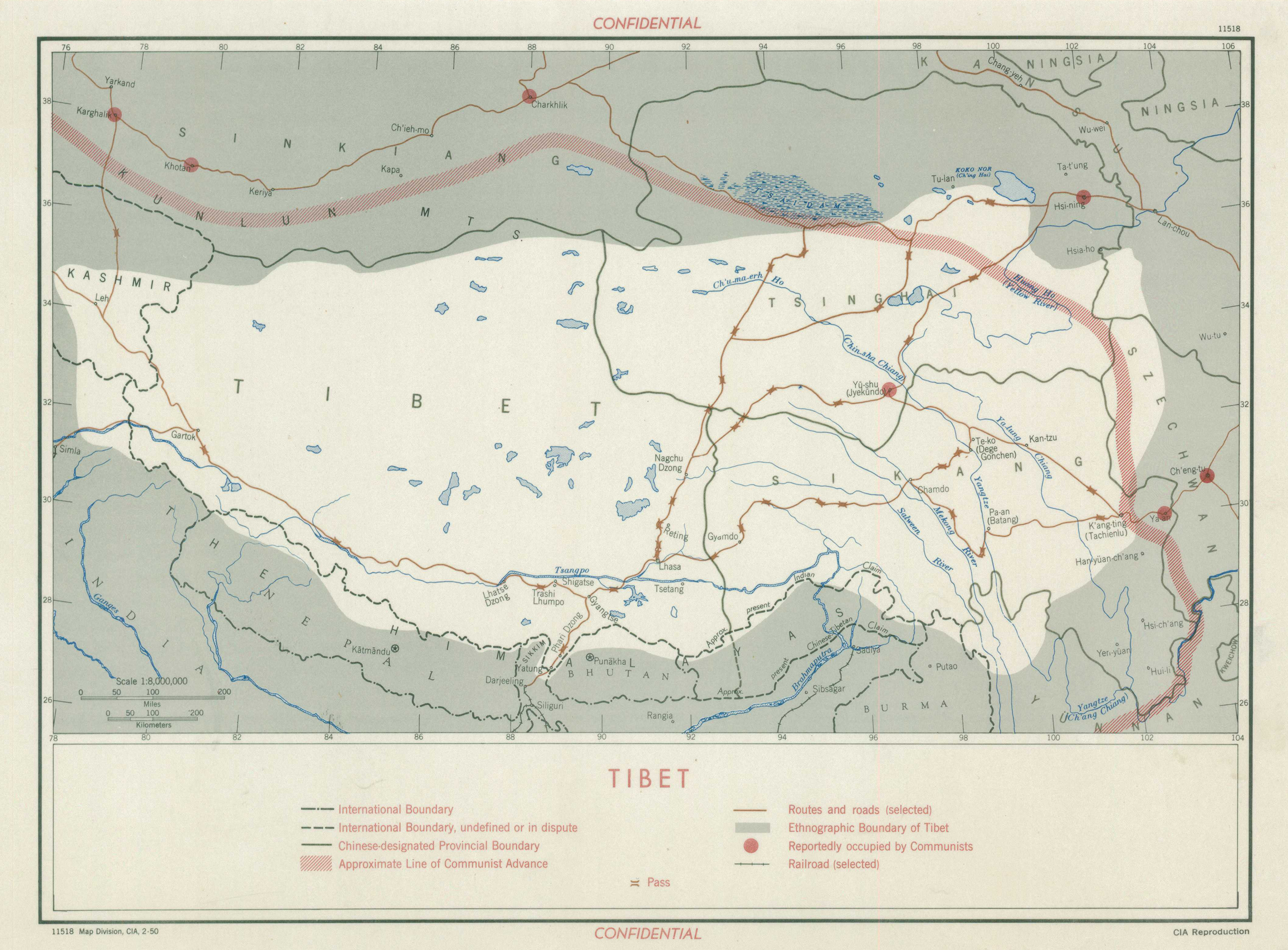
Territorial extent of Tibet and approximate line of the Chinese Communist advance in 1950

After his enthronement, the Dalai Lama's childhood was then spent between the Potala Palace and Norbulingka, his summer residence, both of which are now UNESCO World Heritage Sites.

Chiang Kai Shek ordered Ma Bufang to put his Muslim soldiers on alert for an invasion of Tibet in 1942. Ma Bufang complied, and moved several thousand troops to the border with Tibet. Chiang also threatened the Tibetans with aerial bombardment if they worked with the Japanese. Ma Bufang attacked the Tibetan Buddhist Tsang monastery in 1941. He also constantly attacked the Labrang monastery.

In October 1950 the army of the People's Republic of China marched to the edge of the Dalai Lama's territory and sent a delegation after defeating a legion of the Tibetan army in warlord-controlled Kham. On 17 November 1950, at the age of 15, the 14th Dalai Lama assumed full temporal (political) power as ruler of Tibet.

=== Cooperation and conflicts with the People's Republic of China ===
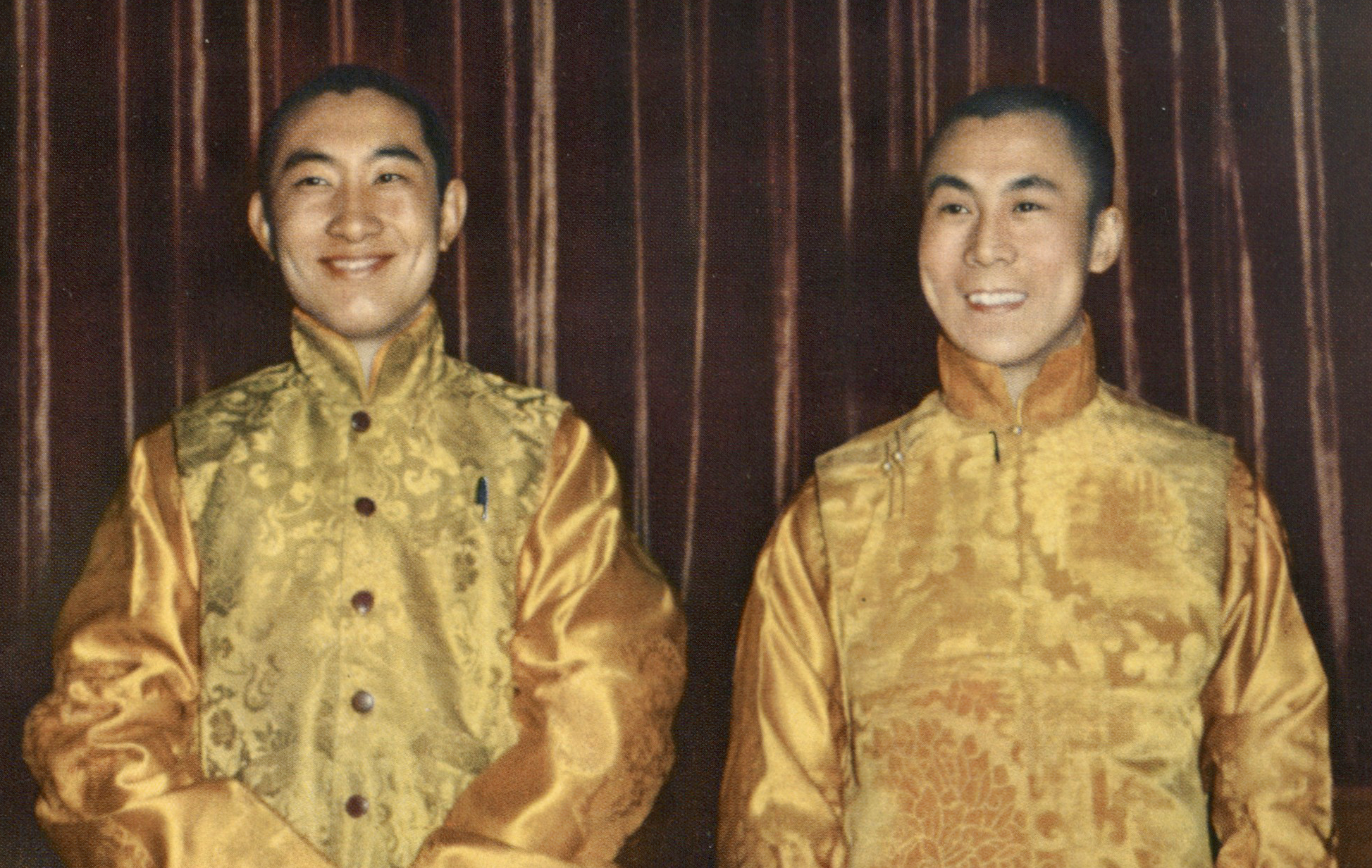
A rare shot of an adult Dalai Lama without glasses (right) and Panchen Lama (left). 1954–1955.

The Dalai Lama's formal rule as head of the government in Tibet was brief although he was enthroned as spiritual leader on 22 February 1940. When Chinese cadres entered Tibet in 1950, with a crisis looming, the Dalai Lama was asked to assume the role of head of state at the age of 15, which he did on 17 November 1950. Customarily the Dalai Lama would typically assume control at about the age of 20.

He sent a delegation to Beijing, which signed the Seventeen Point Agreement. The Dalai Lama believes the draft agreement was written by China. Tibetan representatives were not allowed to suggest any alterations and China did not allow the Tibetan representatives to communicate with the Tibetan government in Lhasa. The Tibetan delegation was not authorised by Lhasa to sign, but ultimately submitted to pressure from the Chinese to sign anyway, using seals specifically made for the purpose. The Seventeen Point Agreement recognised Chinese sovereignty over Tibet, but China allowed the Dalai Lama to continue to rule Tibet internally, and it allowed the system of feudal peasantry to persist. In September 1951, following a lengthy discussion with the returning delegates, the National Assembly recommended that the Dalai Lama accept the Seventeen Point Agreement. He telegraphed his confirmation to Chairman Mao Zedong on 24 October.

Scholar Robert Barnett wrote of the serfdom controversy: "So even if it were agreed that serfdom and feudalism existed in Tibet, this would be little different other than in technicalities from conditions in any other 'premodern' peasant society, including most of China at that time. The power of the Chinese argument therefore lies in its implication that serfdom, and with it feudalism, is inseparable from extreme abuse. Evidence to support this linkage has not been found by scholars other than those close to Chinese governmental circles. Goldstein, for example, notes that although the system was based on serfdom, it was not necessarily feudal, and he refutes any automatic link with extreme abuse."

The 19-year-old Dalai Lama toured China for almost a year from 1954 to 1955, meeting many of the revolutionary leaders and the top echelon of the Chinese communist leadership who created modern China. He learned Chinese and socialist ideals, as explained by his Chinese hosts, on a tour of China showcasing the benefits of socialism and the effective governance provided to turn the large, impoverished nation into a modern and egalitarian society, which impressed him. In September 1954, he went to the Chinese capital to meet Chairman Mao Zedong with the 10th Panchen Lama and attend the 1st National People's Congress as a delegate, primarily discussing China's constitution. On 27 September 1954, the Dalai Lama was selected as a Vice-chairman of the Standing Committee of the National People's Congress, a post he officially held until 1964.

Mao Zedong, who, "according to the Tibetan leader, treated him as a 'father would treat a son'", "also showed Tibet’s political leader and its foremost spiritual master its ambivalence to Tibetan Buddhism. The Dalai Lama recounts this episode in his autobiography, My Land and My People,

'A few days later I had a message from Mao Tse-tung to say that he was coming to see me in an hour’s time. When he arrived he said he had merely come to call. Then something made him say that Buddhism was quite a good religion, and Lord Buddha, although he was a prince, had given a good deal of thought to the question of improving the conditions of the people. He also observed that the Goddess Tara was a kind-hearted woman. After a very few minutes, he left. I was quite bewildered by these remarks and did not know what to make of them.'

The comments Mao made during their last meeting shocked the Dalai Lama beyond belief. 'My final interview with this remarkable man was toward the end of my visit to China. I was at a meeting of the Standing Committee of the National Assembly when I received a message asking me to go to see him at this house. By then, I had been able to complete a tour of the Chinese provinces, and I was able to tell him truthfully that I had been greatly impressed and interested by all the development projects I had seen. Then he started to give me a long lecture about the true form of democracy, and advised me how to become a leader of the people and how to take heed of their suggestions. And then he edged closer to me on his chair and whispered:

'I understand you very well. But of course, religion is poison. It has two great defects: It undermines the race, and secondly it retards the progress of the country. Tibet and Mongolia have both been poisoned by it.'" In his autobiography, Freedom In Exile, the Dalai Lama recalls: "How could he have thought I was not religious to the core of my being?'"

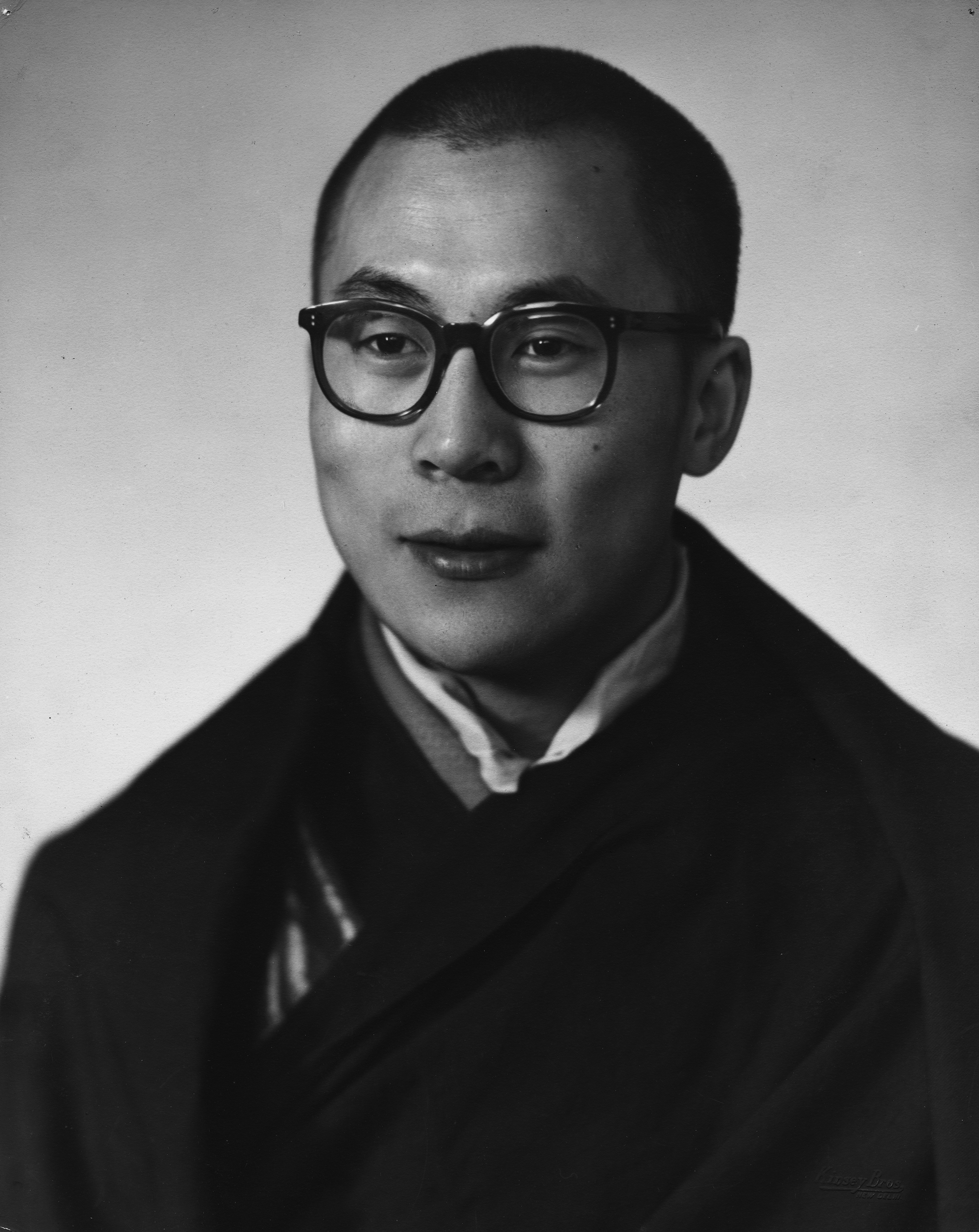
The 14th Dalai Lama in 1956

In 1956, on a trip to India to celebrate the Buddha's Birthday, the Dalai Lama asked the Prime Minister of India, Jawaharlal Nehru, if he would allow him political asylum should he choose to stay. Nehru discouraged this as a provocation against peace, and reminded him of the Indian Government's non-interventionist stance agreed upon with its 1954 treaty with China.

Long called a "splittist" and "traitor" by China, the Dalai Lama has attempted formal talks over Tibet's status in China. In 2019, after the United States passed a law requiring the US to deny visas to Chinese officials in charge of implementing policies that restrict foreign access to Tibet, the US Ambassador to China "encouraged the Chinese government to engage in substantive dialogue with the Dalai Lama or his representatives, without preconditions, to seek a settlement that resolves differences".

The Chinese Foreign Ministry has warned the US and other countries to "shun" the Dalai Lama during visits and often uses trade negotiations and human rights talks as an incentive to do so. China sporadically bans images of the Dalai Lama and arrests citizens for owning photos of him in Tibet. Tibet Autonomous Region government job candidates must strongly denounce the Dalai Lama, as announced on the Tibet Autonomous Region government's online education platform,

"Support the (Communist) Party's leadership, resolutely implement the [Chinese Communist] Party's line, line of approach, policies, and the guiding ideology of Tibet work in the new era; align ideologically, politically, and in action with the Party Central Committee; oppose any splittist tendencies; expose and criticize the Dalai Lama; safeguard the unity of the motherland and ethnic unity and take a firm stand on political issues, taking a clear and distinct stand".

In April 2018, the Dalai Lama confirmed Chinese government claims about Gedhun Choekyi Nyima by saying that he knew from "reliable sources" that the Panchen Lama he had recognised was alive and receiving normal education. He said he hoped that the Chinese-recognised Panchen Lama (Gyaincain Norbu) studied well under the guidance of a good teacher, adding that there were instances in Tibetan Buddhist tradition, of a reincarnated lama taking more than one manifestation.

The Dalai Lama is a target of Chinese state sponsored hacking. Security experts claim "targeting Tibetan activists is a strong indicator of official Chinese government involvement" since economic information is the primary goal of private Chinese hackers. In 2009 the personal office of the Dalai Lama asked researchers at the Munk Center for International Studies at the University of Toronto to check its computers for malicious software. This led to uncovering GhostNet, a large-scale cyber spying operation which infiltrated at least 1,295 computers in 103 countries, including embassies, foreign ministries, other government offices, and organisations affiliated with the Dalai Lama in India, Brussels, London and New York, and believed to be focusing on the governments of South and Southeast Asia.

A second cyberspy network, Shadow Network, was discovered by the same researchers in 2010. Stolen documents included a year's worth of the Dalai Lama's personal email, and classified government material relating to India, West Africa, the Russian Federation, the Middle East, and NATO. "Sophisticated" hackers were linked to universities in China, Beijing again denied involvement. Chinese hackers posing as The New York Times, Amnesty International and other organisation's reporters targeted the private office of the Dalai Lama, Tibetan Parliament members, and Tibetan nongovernmental organisations, among others, in 2019.

=== Exile to India ===
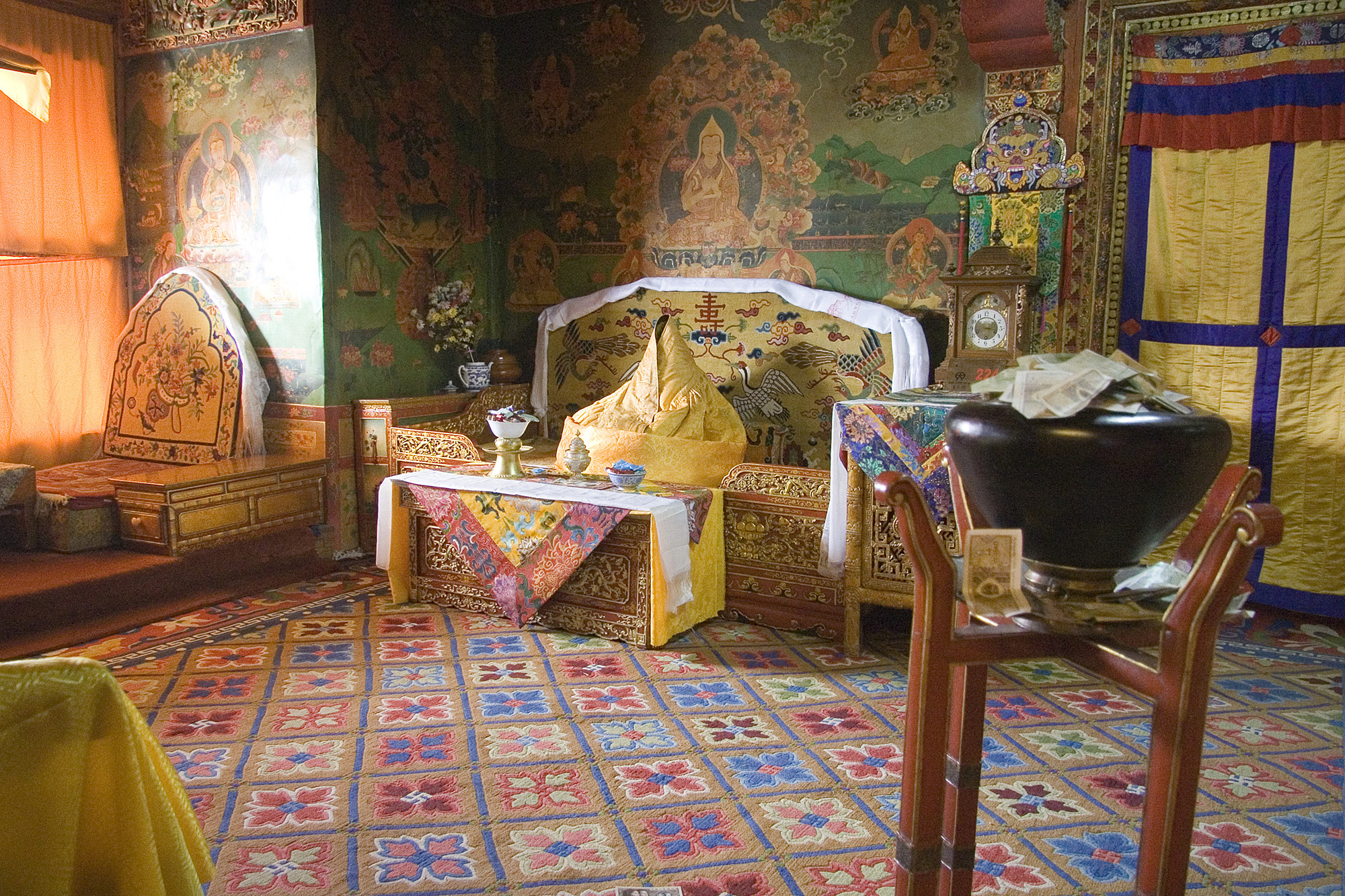
The abandoned former quarters of the Dalai Lama at the Potala. The empty vestment placed on the throne symbolises his absence.

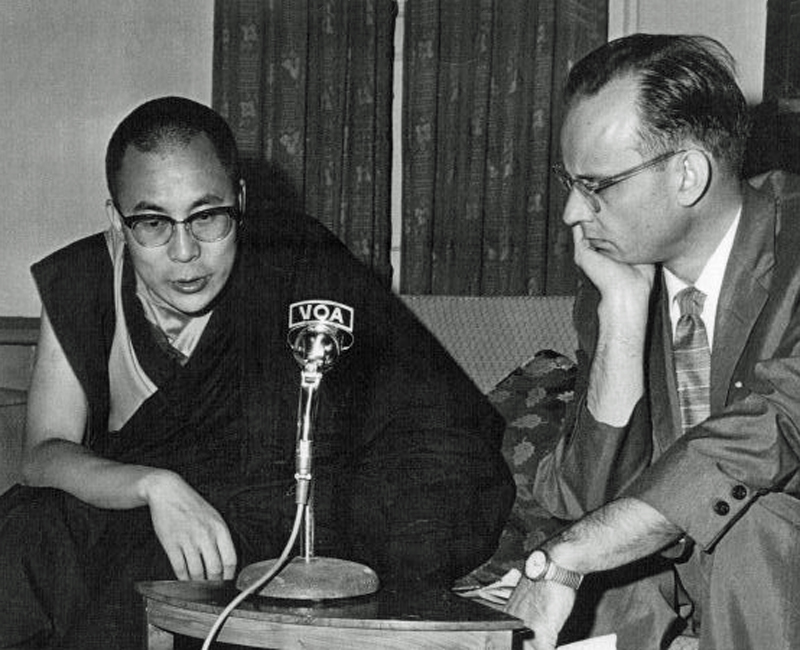
The 14th Dalai Lama being interviewed by Voice of America journalist Lillard Hill in 1959

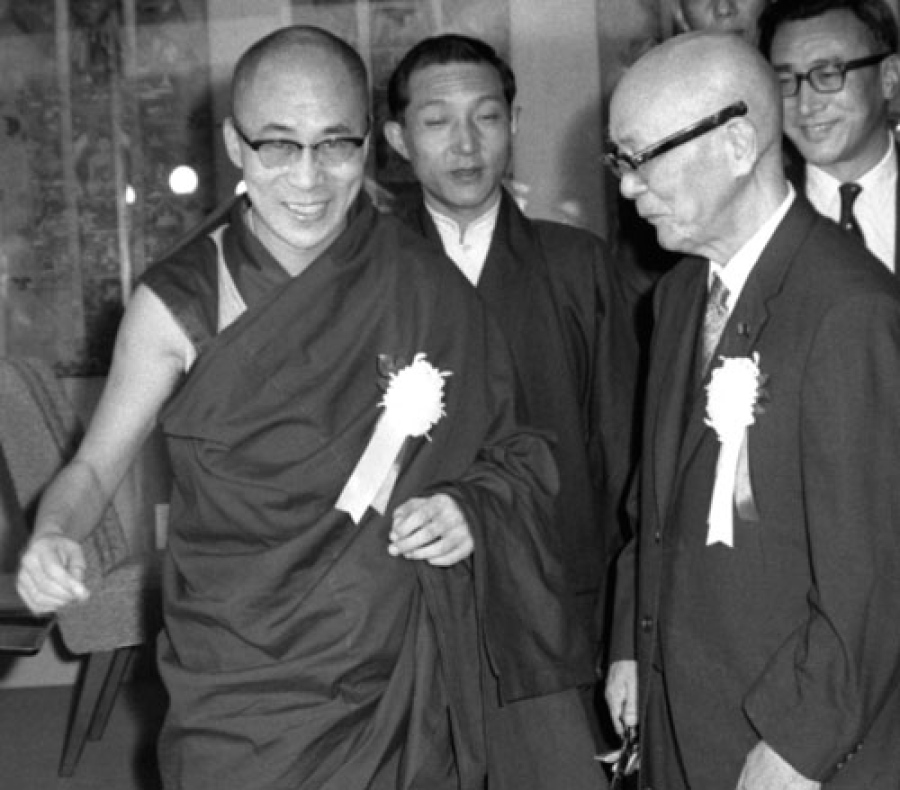
In 1967, Dalai Lama was out of India for the first time since he resided there from 1959. The Japanese government granted him a visa on the condition he would not attack PRC while in Japan.

At the outset of the 1959 Tibetan uprising, fearing for his life, the Dalai Lama and his retinue fled Tibet with the help of the CIA's Special Activities Division, crossing into India on 30 March 1959, reaching Tezpur in Assam on 18 April. Some time later he set up the Government of Tibet in Exile in Dharamshala, India, which is often referred to as "Little Lhasa". After the founding of the government in exile he re-established the approximately 80,000 Tibetan refugees who followed him into exile in agricultural settlements.

He created a Tibetan educational system in order to teach the Tibetan children the language, history, religion, and culture. The Tibetan Institute of Performing Arts was established in 1959 and the Central Institute of Higher Tibetan Studies became the primary university for Tibetans in India in 1967. He supported the refounding of 200 monasteries and nunneries in an attempt to preserve Tibetan Buddhist teachings and the Tibetan way of life.

The Dalai Lama appealed to the United Nations on the rights of Tibetans. This appeal resulted in three resolutions adopted by the General Assembly in 1959, 1961, and 1965, all before the People's Republic was allowed representation at the United Nations. The resolutions called on China to respect the human rights of Tibetans. In 1963, he promulgated a democratic constitution which is based upon the Universal Declaration of Human Rights, creating an elected parliament and an administration to champion his cause. In 1970, he opened the Library of Tibetan Works and Archives in Dharamshala which houses over 80,000 manuscripts and important knowledge resources related to Tibetan history, politics and culture. It is considered one of the most important institutions for Tibetology in the world.

In 2016, there were demands from Indian citizens and politicians of different political parties to confer the Dalai Lama the prestigious Bharat Ratna, the highest civilian honour of India, which has only been awarded to a non-Indian citizen twice in its history.

In 2021, it was revealed that the Dalai Lama's inner circle were listed in the Pegasus project data as having been targeted with spyware on their phones. Analysis strongly indicates potential targets were selected by the Indian government.

In 2025, Indian Members of Parliament (MPs), led by Sujeet Kumar, BJP Rajya Sabha MP, called for His Holiness to be awarded the Bharat Ratna.

=== International advocacy ===
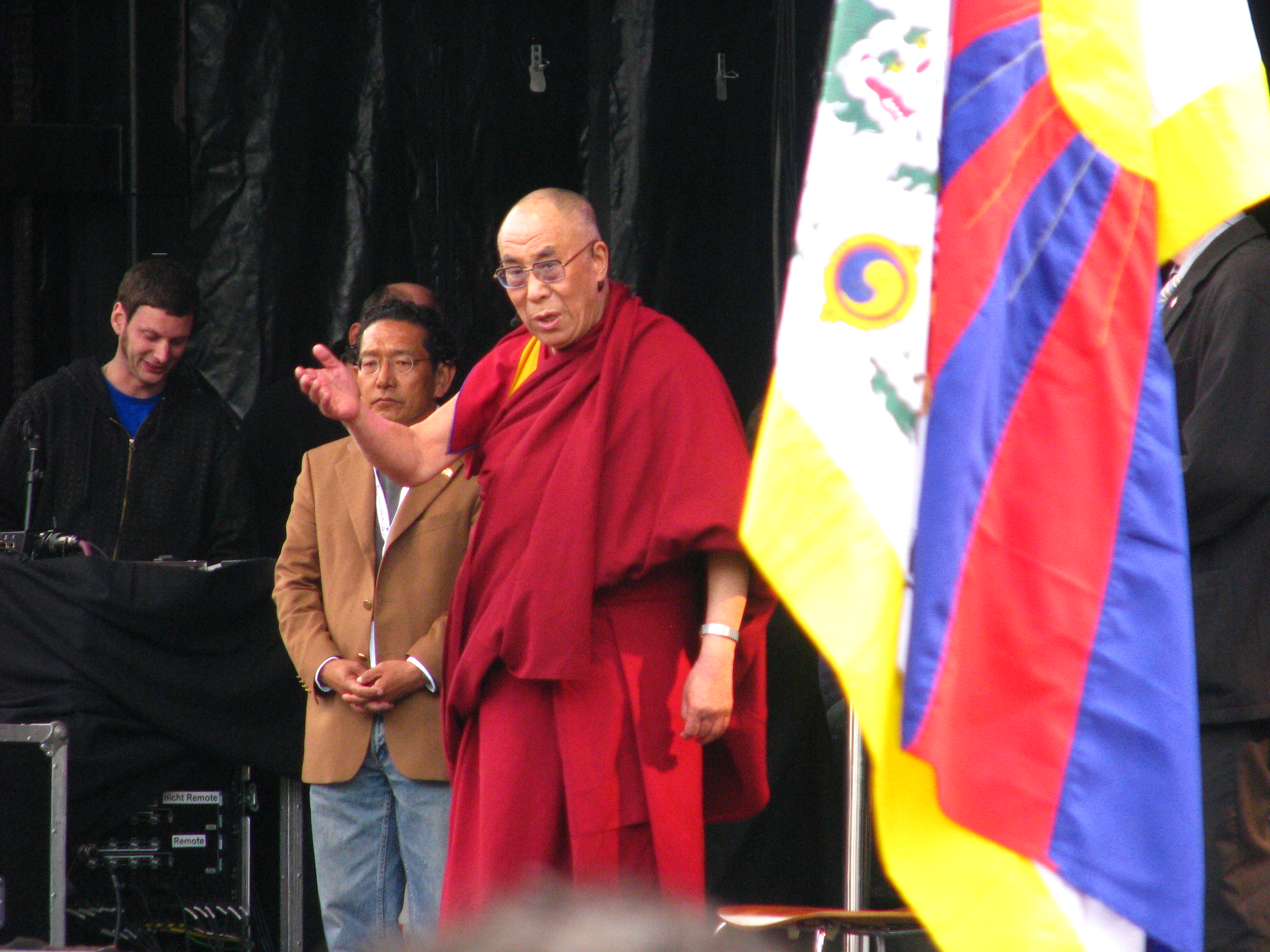
The flag of Tibet (designed by the 13th Dalai Lama) shares the stage with Gyatso in April 2010 in Zurich, Switzerland.

At the Congressional Human Rights Caucus in 1987 in Washington, D.C., the Dalai Lama gave a speech outlining his ideas for the future status of Tibet. The plan called for Tibet to become a democratic "zone of peace" without nuclear weapons, and with support for human rights. The plan would come to be known as the "Strasbourg proposal", because the Dalai Lama expanded on the plan at Strasbourg on 15 June 1988. There, he proposed the creation of a self-governing Tibet "in association with the People's Republic of China." This would have been pursued by negotiations with the PRC government, but the plan was rejected by the Tibetan Government-in-Exile in 1991. The Dalai Lama has indicated that he wishes to return to Tibet only if the People's Republic of China agrees not to make any precondition for his return. In the 1970s, the Paramount leader Deng Xiaoping set China's sole return requirement to the Dalai Lama as that he "must [come back] as a Chinese citizen ... that is, patriotism".

The Dalai Lama celebrated his 70th birthday on 6 July 2005. About 10,000 Tibetan refugees, monks and foreign tourists gathered outside his home. Patriarch Alexius II of the Russian Orthodox Church alleged positive relations with Buddhists. However, later that year, the Russian state prevented the Dalai Lama from fulfilling an invitation to the traditionally Buddhist republic of Kalmykia. The President of the Republic of China (Taiwan), Chen Shui-bian, attended an evening celebrating the Dalai Lama's birthday at the Chiang Kai-shek Memorial Hall in Taipei. In October 2008 in Japan, the Dalai Lama addressed the 2008 Tibetan violence that had erupted and that the Chinese government accused him of fomenting. He responded that he had "lost faith" in efforts to negotiate with the Chinese government, and that it was "up to the Tibetan people" to decide what to do.

During his visit to Taiwan after Typhoon Morakot 30 Taiwanese indigenous peoples protested against the Dalai Lama and denounced it as politically motivated.

The Dalai Lama is an advocate for a world free of nuclear weapons, and serves on the Advisory Council of the Nuclear Age Peace Foundation.

The Dalai Lama has voiced his support for the Campaign for the Establishment of a United Nations Parliamentary Assembly, an organisation which campaigns for democratic reformation of the United Nations, and the creation of a more accountable international political system.

=== Teaching activities, public talks ===
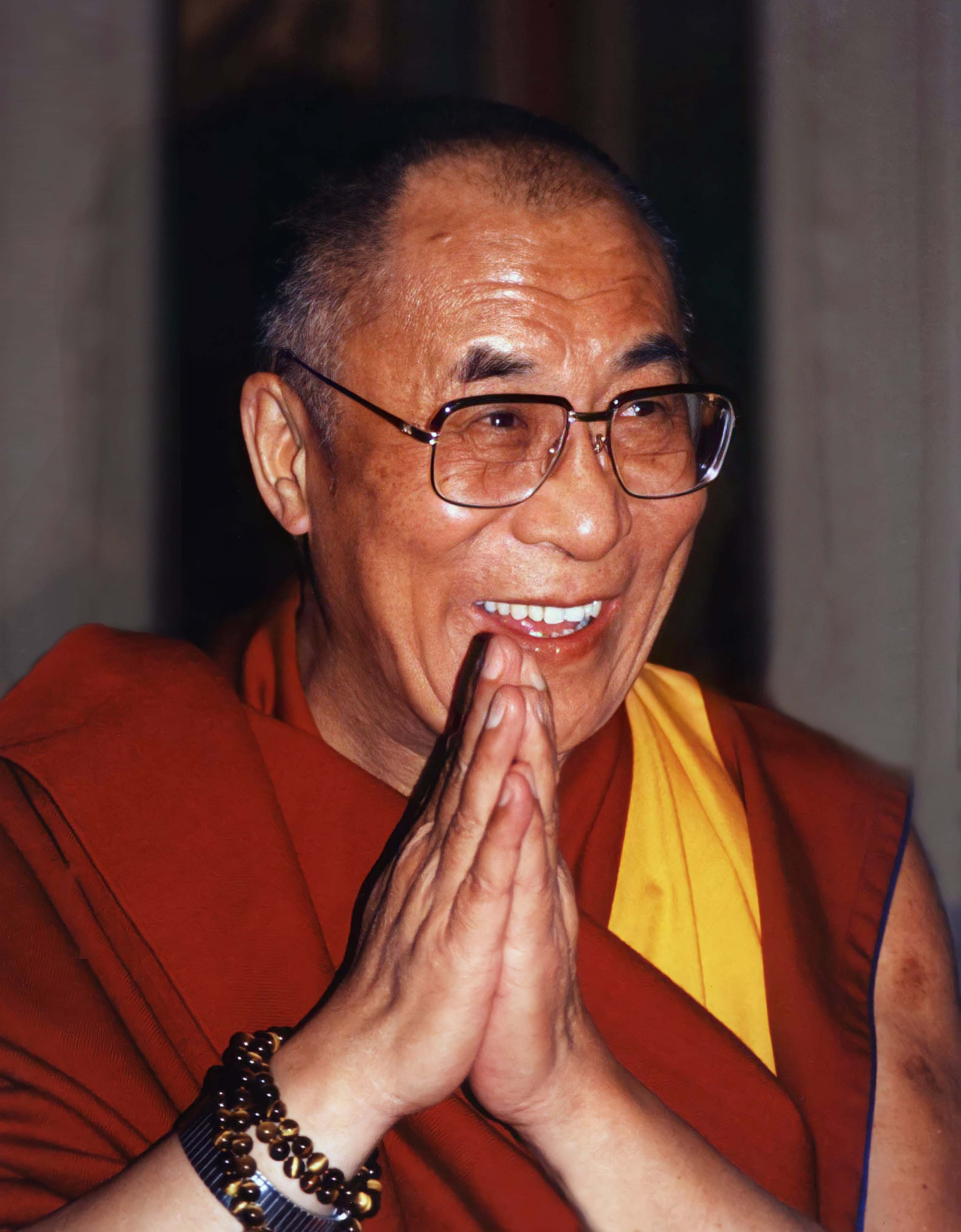
Gyatso photographed by John Mathew Smith during a visit to Washington, D.C. in 1997

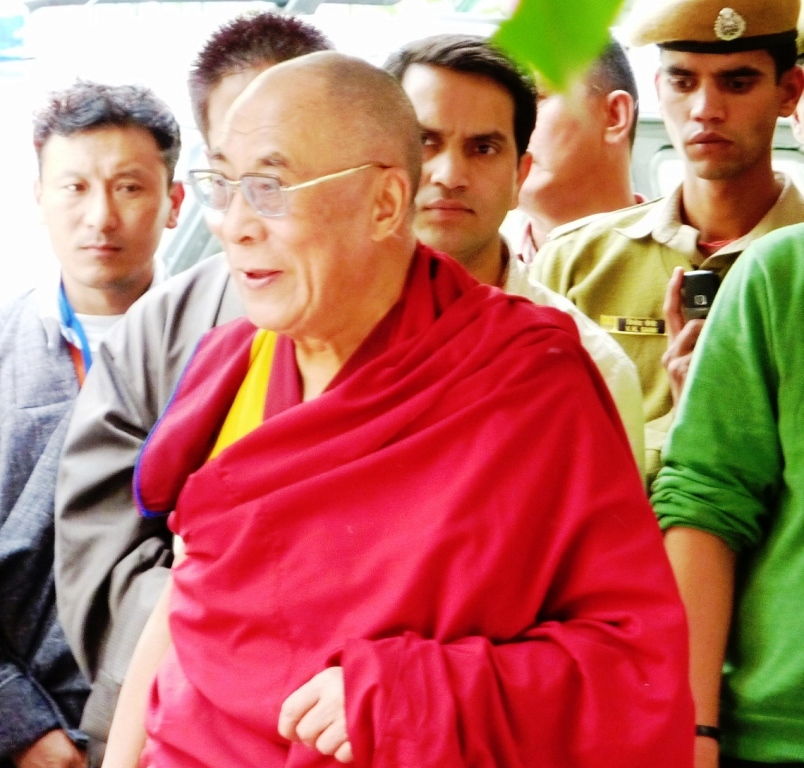
Gyatso giving teachings at Sissu, Lahaul

Until reaching his mid-80s, the Dalai Lama maintained a busy international lecture and teaching schedule. Since 2018, he has continued to teach, but has limited his travel to within India only. His public talks and teachings are usually webcast live in multiple languages, via an inviting organisation's website, or on the Dalai Lama's own website. Scores of his past teaching videos can be viewed there, as well as public talks, conferences, interviews, dialogues and panel discussions.

The Dalai Lama's best known teaching subject is the Kalachakra tantra which, as of 2014, he had conferred a total of 33 times, most often in India's upper Himalayan regions but also in the Western world. The Kalachakra (Wheel of Time) is one of the most complex teachings of Buddhism, sometimes taking two weeks to confer, and he often confers it on very large audiences, up to 200,000 students and disciples at a time.

The Dalai Lama is the author of numerous books on Buddhism, many of them on general Buddhist subjects but also including books on particular topics like Dzogchen, a Nyingma practice.

In his essay "The Ethic of Compassion" (1999), the Dalai Lama expresses his belief that if we only reserve compassion for those that we love, we are ignoring the responsibility of sharing these characteristics of respect and empathy with those we do not have relationships with, which cannot allow us to "cultivate love." He elaborates upon this idea by writing that although it takes time to develop a higher level of compassion, eventually we will recognise that the quality of empathy will become a part of life and promote our quality as humans and inner strength.

For decades, he frequently accepted requests from students to visit various countries worldwide in order to give teachings to large Buddhist audiences, teachings that were usually based on classical Buddhist texts and commentaries, and most often those written by the 17 pandits or great masters of the Nalanda tradition, such as Nagarjuna, Kamalashila, Shantideva, Atisha, Aryadeva and so on. Since 2018, his schedule has contained fewer engagements, with most occurring in India along with a handful webcasts to international audiences.

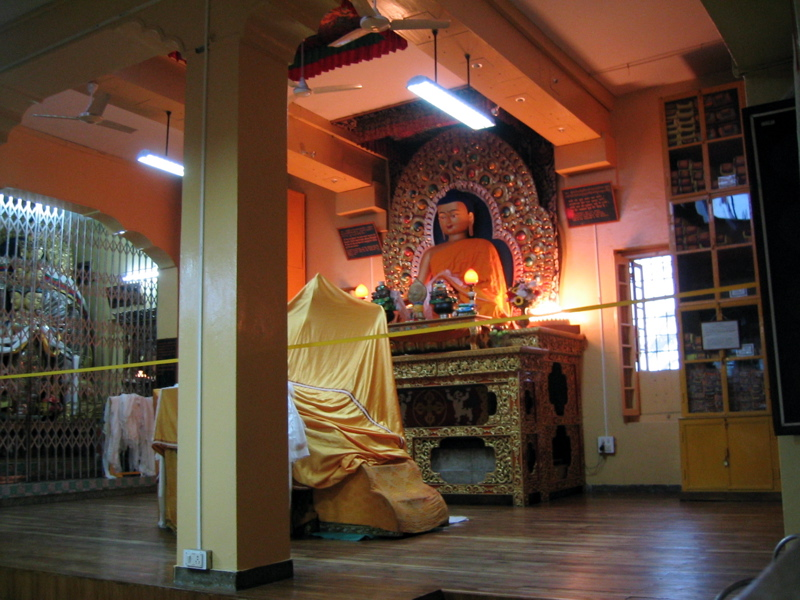
The Dalai Lama's main teaching room at Dharamshala

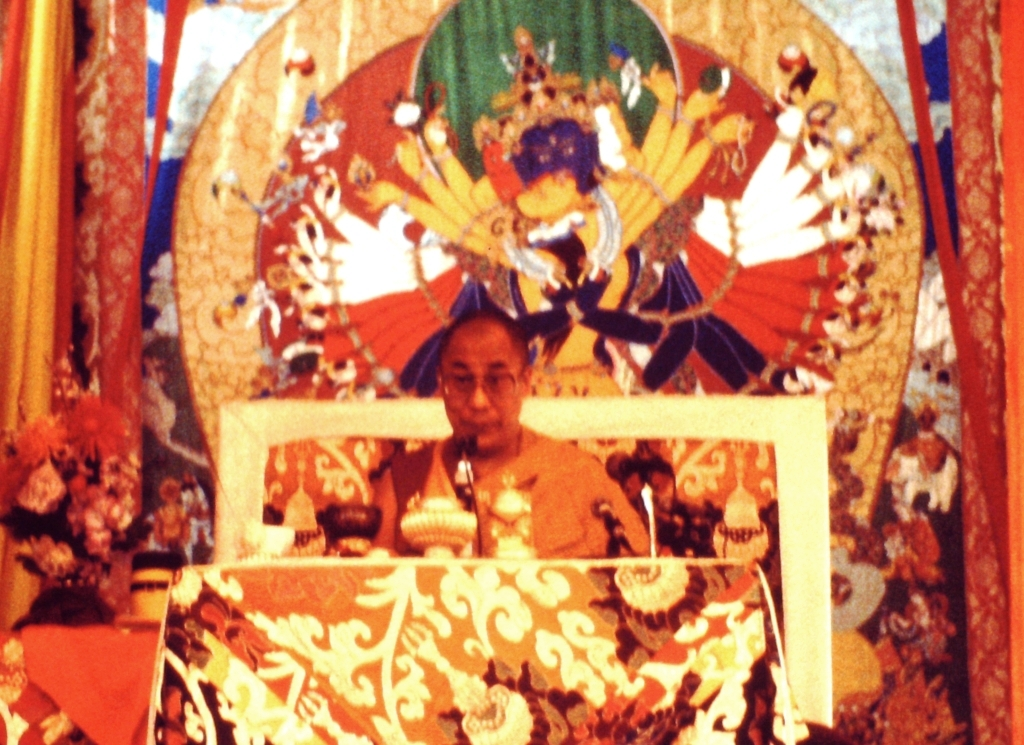
Dalai Lama conferring Kalachakra initiation at Bodh Gaya, India, December 1985

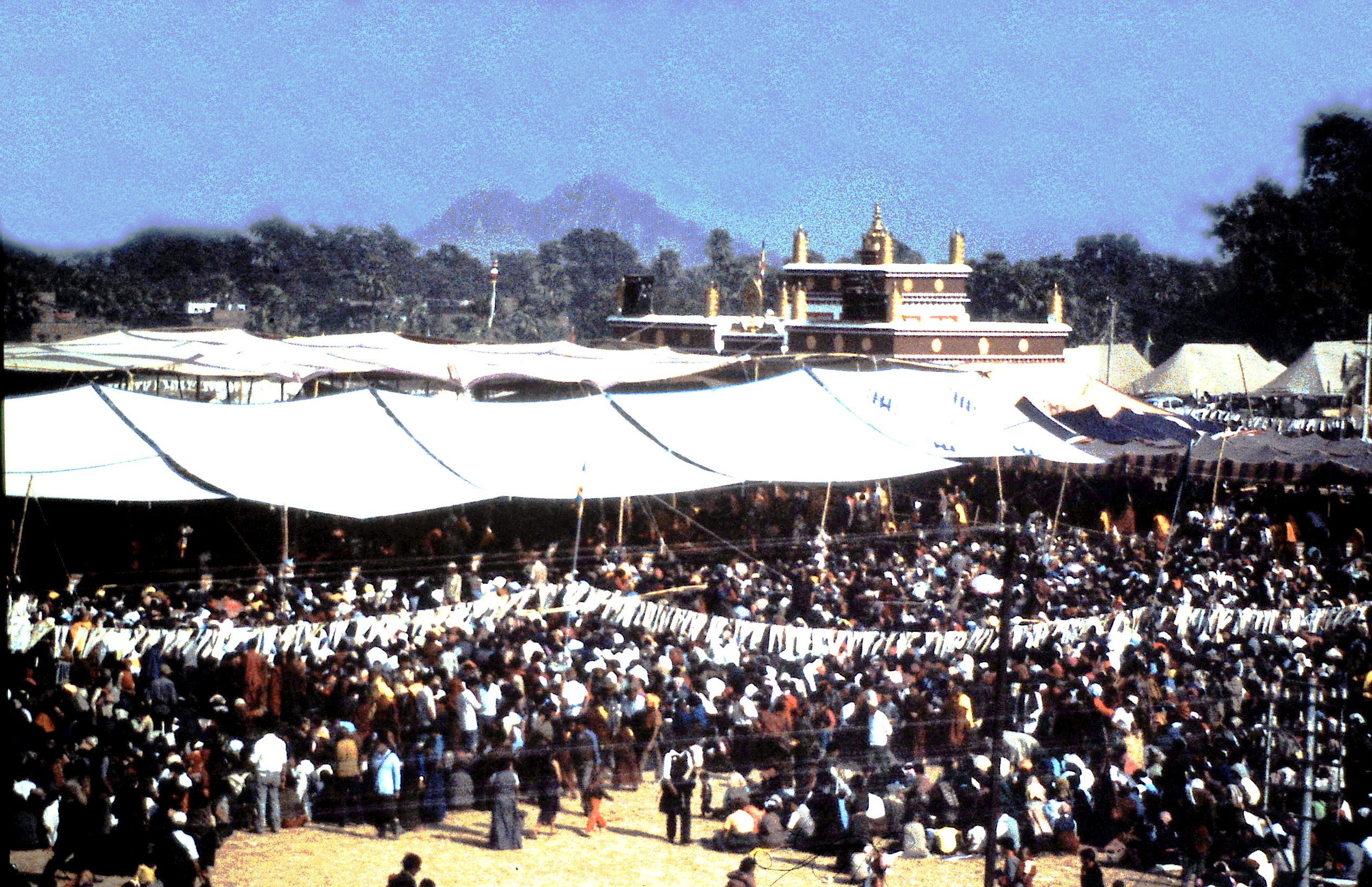
Overview of teaching venue at Bodh Gaya Kalachakra, 1985

The Dalai Lama refers to himself as a follower of these Nalanda masters, in fact he often asserts that 'Tibetan Buddhism' is based on the Buddhist tradition of Nalanda monastery in ancient India, since the texts written by those 17 Nalanda pandits or masters, to whom he has composed a poem of invocation, were brought to Tibet and translated into Tibetan when Buddhism was first established there and have remained central to the teachings of Tibetan Buddhism ever since.

As examples of other teachings, in London in 1984 he was invited to give teachings on the Twelve Links of Dependent Arising, and on Dzogchen, which he gave at Camden Town Hall; in 1988 he was in London once more to give a series of lectures on Tibetan Buddhism in general, called 'A Survey of the Paths of Tibetan Buddhism'. Again in London in 1996 he taught the Four Noble Truths, the basis and foundation of Buddhism accepted by all Buddhists, at the combined invitation of 27 different Buddhist organisations of all schools and traditions belonging to the Network of Buddhist Organisations UK.

In India, the Dalai Lama gives religious teachings and talks in Dharamsala and numerous other locations including the monasteries in the Tibetan refugee settlements, in response to specific requests from Tibetan monastic institutions, Indian academic, religious and business associations, groups of students and individual/private/lay devotees. In India, no fees are charged to attend these teachings since costs are covered by requesting sponsors. When he travels abroad to give teachings there is usually a ticket fee calculated by the inviting organisation to cover the costs involved and any surplus is normally to be donated to recognised charities.

He has frequently visited and lectured at colleges and universities, some of which have conferred honorary degrees upon him.

Dozens of videos of recorded webcasts of the Dalai Lama's public talks on general subjects for non-Buddhists like peace, happiness and compassion, modern ethics, the environment, economic and social issues, gender, the empowerment of women and so forth can be viewed in his office's archive.

=== Interfaith dialogue ===
The Dalai Lama met Pope Paul VI at the Vatican in 1973. He met Pope John Paul II in 1980, 1982, 1986, 1988, 1990, and 2003. In 1990, he met a delegation of Jewish teachers in Dharamshala for an extensive interfaith dialogue. He has since visited Israel three times, and in 2006 met the Chief Rabbi of Israel. In 2006, he met Pope Benedict XVI privately. He has met the Archbishop of Canterbury, Dr. Robert Runcie, and other leaders of the Anglican Church in London, Gordon B. Hinckley, who at the time was the president of the Church of Jesus Christ of Latter-day Saints, as well as senior Eastern Orthodox Church, Muslim, Hindu, Jewish, and Sikh officials.

In 1996 and 2002, he participated in the first two Gethsemani Encounters hosted by the Monastic Interreligious Dialogue at the Abbey of Our Lady of Gethsemani, where Thomas Merton, whom the Dalai Lama had met in the late 1960s, had lived. He is also a member of the Board of World Religious Leaders as part of The Elijah Interfaith Institute and participated in the Third Meeting of the Board of World Religious Leaders in Amritsar, India, on 26 November 2007 to discuss the topic of Love and Forgiveness. In 2009, the Dalai Lama inaugurated an interfaith "World Religions-Dialogue and Symphony" conference at Gujarat's Mahuva religions, according to Morari Bapu.

In 2010, the Dalai Lama, joined by a panel of scholars, launched the Common Ground Project, in Bloomington, Indiana (USA), which was planned by himself and Prince Ghazi bin Muhammad of Jordan during several years of personal conversations. The project is based on the book Common Ground between Islam and Buddhism.

In 2019, the Dalai Lama fully sponsored the first-ever 'Celebrating Diversity in the Muslim World' conference in New Delhi on behalf of the Muslims of Ladakh.

=== Interest in science, and Mind and Life Institute ===
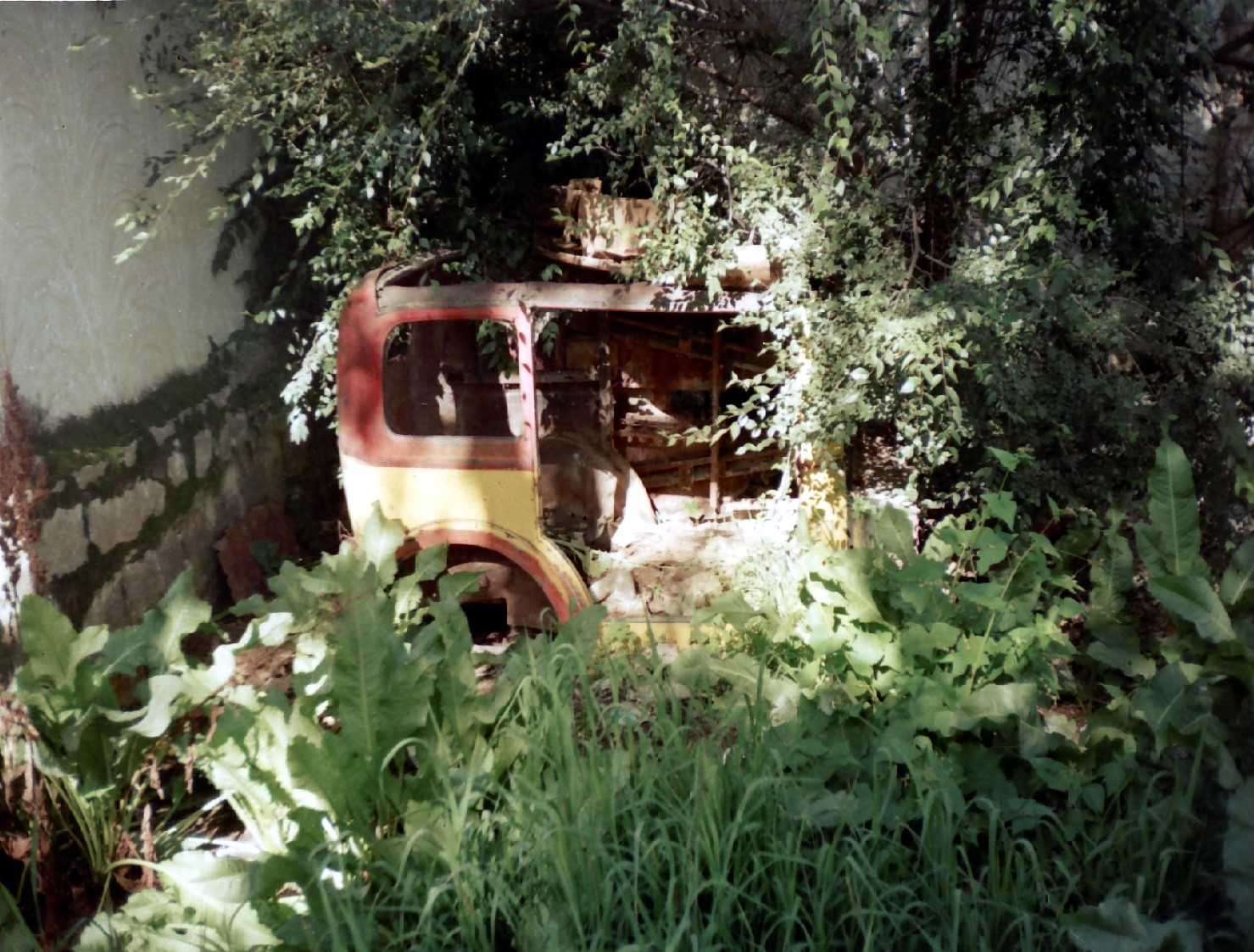
Remains of Dalai Lama's Baby Austin car. Lhasa, 1993

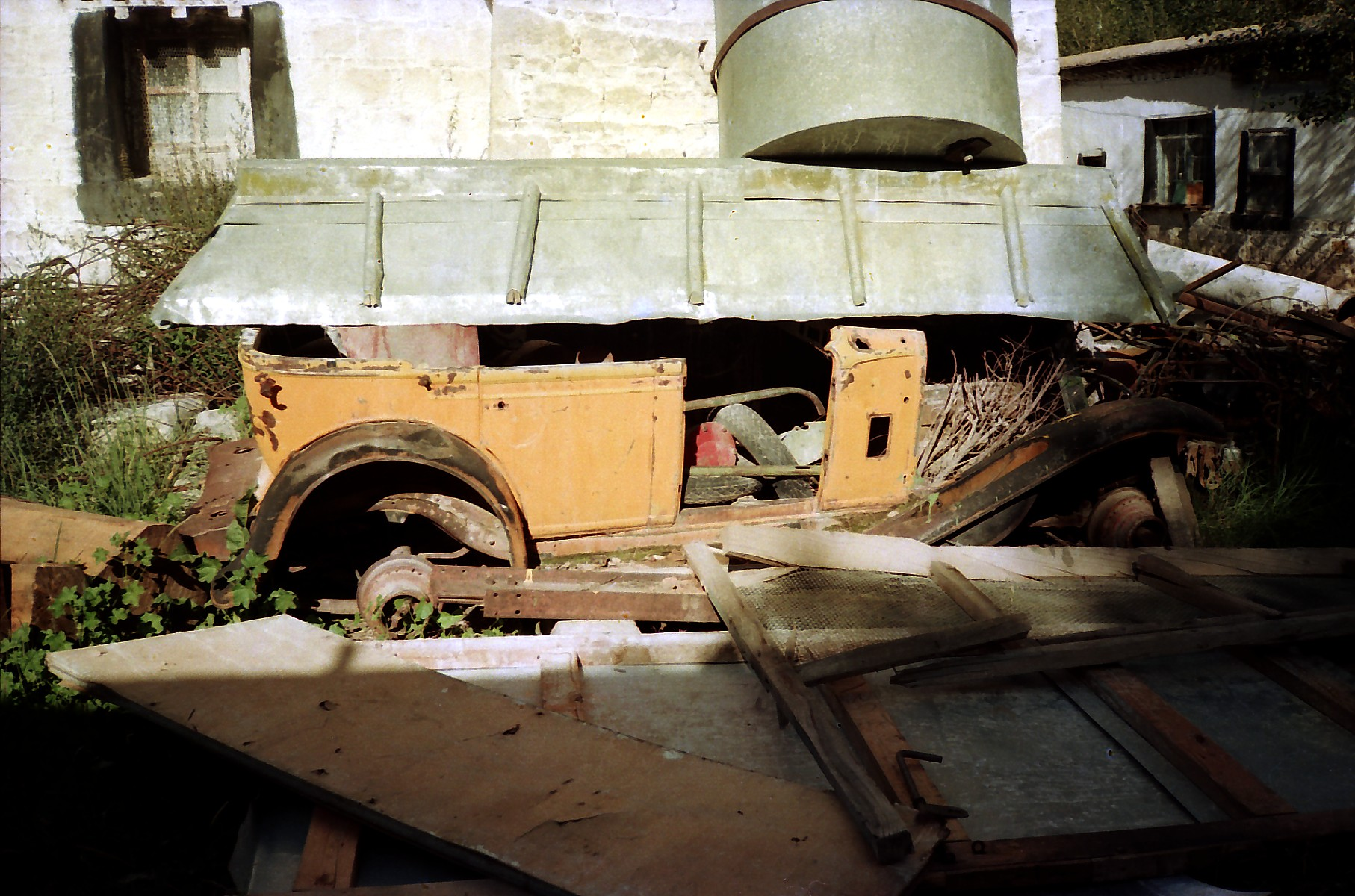
Remains of Dalai Lama's Dodge car. Lhasa, 1993

The Dalai Lama's lifelong interest in science and technology dates from his childhood in Lhasa, Tibet, when he was fascinated by mechanical objects like clocks, watches, telescopes, film projectors, clockwork soldiers and motor cars, and loved to repair, disassemble and reassemble them. Once, observing the Moon through a telescope as a child, he realised it was a crater-pocked lump of rock and not a heavenly body emitting its own light as Tibetan cosmologists had taught him. He has also said that had he not been brought up as a monk he would probably have been an engineer. On his first trip to the west in 1973 he asked to visit Cambridge University's astrophysics department in the UK and he sought out renowned scientists such as Sir Karl Popper, David Bohm and Carl Friedrich von Weizsäcker, who taught him the basics of science.

The Dalai Lama sees important common ground between science and Buddhism in having the same approach to challenge dogma on the basis of empirical evidence that comes from observation and analysis of phenomena.

His growing wish to develop meaningful scientific dialogue to explore the Buddhism and science interface led to invitations for him to attend relevant conferences on his visits to the west, including the Alpbach Symposia on Consciousness in 1983 where he met and had discussions with the late Chilean neuroscientist Francisco J. Varela. Also in 1983, the American social entrepreneur and innovator R. Adam Engle, who had become aware of the Dalai Lama's deep interest in science, was already considering the idea of facilitating for him a serious dialogue with a selection of appropriate scientists. In 1984 Engle formally offered to the Dalai Lama's office to organise a week-long, formal dialogue for him with a suitable team of scientists, provided that the Dalai Lama would wish to fully participate in such a dialogue. Within 48 hours the Dalai Lama confirmed to Engle that he was "truly interested in participating in something substantial about science" so Engle proceeded with launching the project. Francisco Varela, having heard about Engle's proposal, then called him to tell him of his earlier discussions with the Dalai Lama and to offer his scientific collaboration to the project. Engle accepted, and Varela assisted him to assemble his team of six specialist scientists for the first 'Mind and Life' dialogue on the cognitive sciences, which was eventually held with the Dalai Lama at his residence in Dharamsala in 1987. This five-day event was so successful that at the end the Dalai Lama told Engle he would very much like to repeat it again in the future. Engle then started work on arranging a second dialogue, this time with neuroscientists in California, and the discussions from the first event were edited and published as Mind and Life's first book, "Gentle Bridges: Conversations with the Dalai Lama on the Sciences of Mind".

As Mind and Life Institute's remit expanded, Engle formalised the organisation as a non-profit foundation after the third dialogue, held in 1990, which initiated the undertaking of neurobiological research programmes in the United States under scientific conditions. Over the following decades, as of 2014 at least 28 dialogues between the Dalai Lama and panels of various world-renowned scientists have followed, held in various countries and covering diverse themes, from the nature of consciousness to cosmology and from quantum mechanics to the neuroplasticity of the brain. Sponsors and partners in these dialogues have included the Massachusetts Institute of Technology, Johns Hopkins University, the Mayo Clinic, and Zurich University.

Apart from time spent teaching Buddhism and fulfilling responsibilities to his Tibetan followers, the Dalai Lama spends time and resources investigating the interface between Buddhism and science through the ongoing series of Mind and Life dialogues and its spin-offs. As the institute's Cofounder and the Honorary chairman he has personally presided over and participated in all its dialogues, which continue to expand worldwide.

These activities have given rise to dozens of DVD sets of the dialogues and books he has authored on them such as Ethics for the New Millennium and The Universe in a Single Atom, as well as scientific papers and university research programmes. On the Tibetan and Buddhist side, science subjects have been added to the curriculum for Tibetan monastic educational institutions and scholarship. On the Western side, university and research programmes initiated by these dialogues and funded with millions of dollars in grants from the Dalai Lama Trust include the Emory-Tibet Partnership, Stanford School of Medicine's Centre for Compassion and Altruism Research and Education (CCARES) and the Centre for Investigating Healthy Minds, amongst others.

In 2019, Emory University's Center for Contemplative Sciences and Compassion-Based Ethics, in partnership with The Dalai Lama Trust and the Vana Foundation of India, launched an international SEE Learning (Social, Emotional and Ethical Learning) program in New Delhi, India, a school curriculum for all classes from kindergarten to Std XII that builds on psychologist Daniel Goleman's work on emotional intelligence in the early 1990s. SEE learning focuses on developing critical thinking, ethical reasoning and compassion and stresses on commonalities rather than on the differences.

In particular, the Mind and Life Education Humanities & Social Sciences initiatives have been instrumental in developing the emerging field of Contemplative Science, by researching, for example, the effects of contemplative practice on the human brain, behaviour and biology.

In his 2005 book The Universe in a Single Atom and elsewhere, and to mark his commitment to scientific truth and its ultimate ascendancy over religious belief, unusually for a major religious leader the Dalai Lama advises his Buddhist followers: "If scientific analysis were conclusively to demonstrate certain claims in Buddhism to be false, then we must accept the findings of science and abandon those claims." He has also cited examples of archaic Buddhist ideas he has abandoned himself on this basis.

These activities have even had an impact in the Chinese capital. In 2013 an 'academic dialogue' with a Chinese scientist, a Tibetan 'living Buddha' and a professor of Religion took place in Beijing. Entitled "High-end dialogue: ancient Buddhism and modern science" it addressed the same considerations that interest the Dalai Lama, described as 'discussing about the similarities between Buddhism and modern science'.

=== Personal meditation practice ===
The Dalai Lama uses various meditation techniques, including analytic meditation and emptiness meditation. He has said that the aim of meditation is to "to maintain a very full state of alertness and mindfulness, and then try to see the natural state of your consciousness." and that "all human beings have an innate desire to overcome suffering, to find happiness. Training the mind to think differently, through meditation, is one important way to avoid suffering and be happy."

=== Retirement and succession plans ===
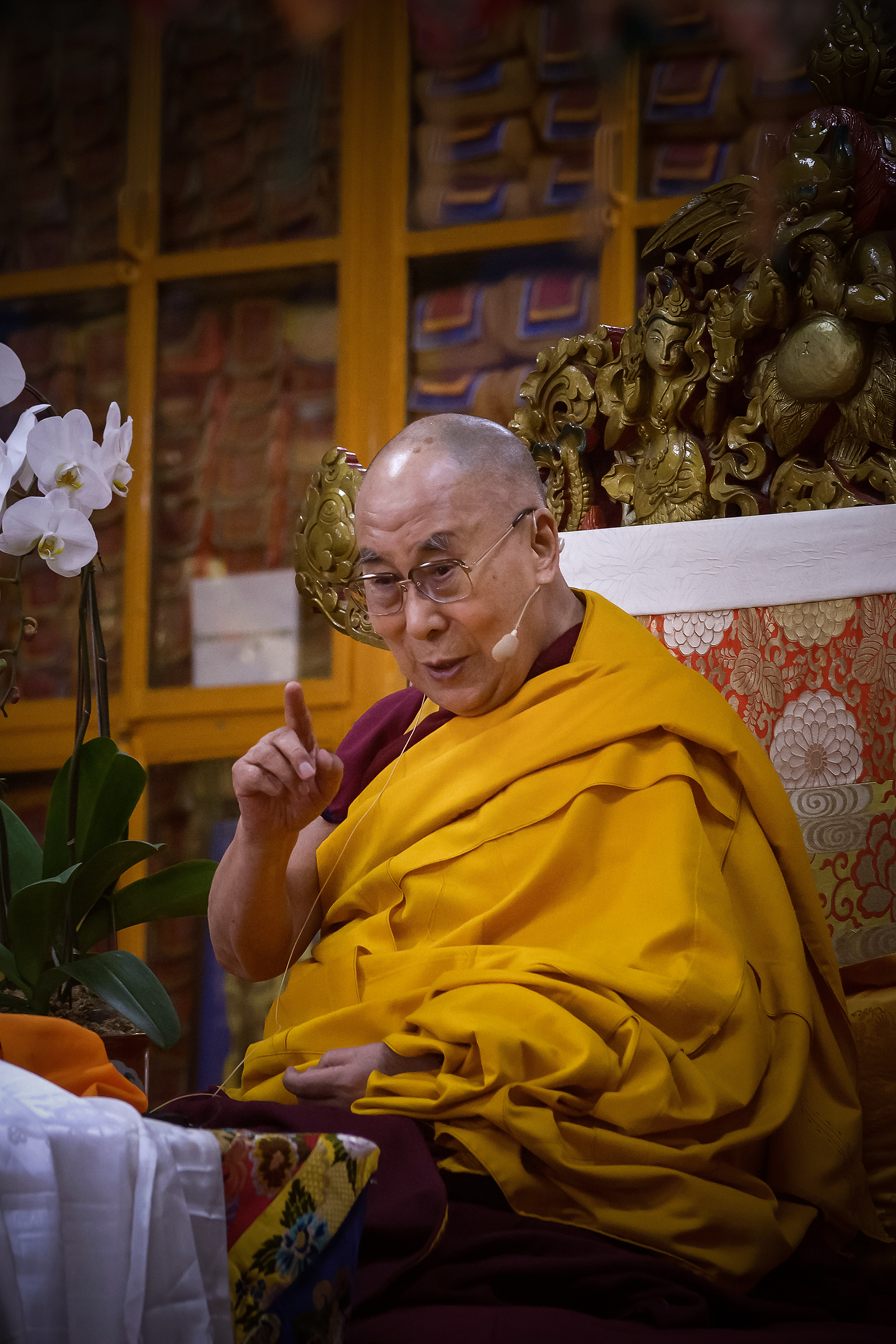
The 14th Dalai Lama in 2017

In 2007, the 14th Dalai Lama said his reincarnation could be a woman. This was mentioned again in 2015 and 2019.

In May 2011, the Dalai Lama retired from the Central Tibetan Administration.

In September 2011, the Dalai Lama issued the following statement concerning his succession and reincarnation:

When I am about ninety I will consult the high Lamas of the Tibetan Buddhist traditions, the Tibetan public, and other concerned people who follow Tibetan Buddhism, and re-evaluate whether the institution of the Dalai Lama should continue or not. On that basis we will take a decision. If it is decided that the reincarnation of the Dalai Lama should continue and there is a need for the Fifteenth Dalai Lama to be recognized, responsibility for doing so will primarily rest on the concerned officers of the Dalai Lama's Gaden Phodrang Trust. They should consult the various heads of the Tibetan Buddhist traditions and the reliable oath-bound Dharma Protectors who are linked inseparably to the lineage of the Dalai Lamas. They should seek advice and direction from these concerned beings and carry out the procedures of search and recognition in accordance with past tradition. I shall leave clear written instructions about this. Bear in mind that, apart from the reincarnation recognized through such legitimate methods, no recognition or acceptance should be given to a candidate chosen for political ends by anyone, including those in the People's Republic of China.

In October 2011, the Dalai Lama repeated his statement in an interview with Canadian CTV News. He added that Chinese laws banning the selection of successors based on reincarnation will not impact his decisions. "Naturally my next life is entirely up to me. No one else. And also this is not a political matter", he said in the interview. The Dalai Lama also added that he has not decided on whether he would reincarnate or be the last Dalai Lama.

In an interview with the German newspaper Welt am Sonntag published on 7 September 2014 the Dalai Lama stated "the institution of the Dalai Lama has served its purpose", and that "We had a Dalai Lama for almost five centuries. The 14th Dalai Lama now is very popular. Let us then finish with a popular Dalai Lama." In response, the Chinese government said the title of Dalai Lama has been conferred by the central government for hundreds of years and the 14th Dalai Lama has ulterior motives. This was taken by Tibetan activists and The Wire to mean that China will make the Dalai Lama reincarnate no matter what.

Gyatso has also expressed fear that the Chinese government would manipulate any reincarnation selection in order to choose a successor that would go along with their political goals.

In 2015, the 14th Dalai Lama has claimed he may be reincarnated as a mischievous blonde woman. In 2019, the 14th Dalai Lama said that if a female Dalai Lama comes, she should be more attractive. Chinese politician Padma Choling accused the 14th Dalai Lama of flip-flopping with his various statements on the issue, and of hypocrisy as he himself was reincarnated. He also accused the 14th Dalai Lama of profaning Tibetan Buddhism "by doubting his reincarnation".

In October 2019, the 14th Dalai Lama stated that because of the feudal origin of the Dalai Lama reincarnation system, the reincarnation system should end.

However, in July 2025, as the 14th Dalai Lama reached the age of 90, he addressed growing discussions about his succession by reaffirming that he will be reincarnated and that the process of identifying his successor should follow traditional Tibetan Buddhist practices. In a message shared during a prayer ceremony and posted on social media, the Dalai Lama stated that only his non-profit institution, Gaden Phodrang Foundation of the Dalai Lama, has the legitimate authority to oversee the selection of his reincarnation. He emphasised that the identification of the 15th Dalai Lama should involve consultation with senior leaders of Tibetan Buddhist schools and with spiritual entities known as oath-bound Dharma Protectors, following established historical customs. The Dalai Lama reaffirmed that his reincarnation will occur outside China. In a direct challenge to China, he asserted that the centuries-old spiritual institution bearing his name will endure beyond his death, emphasising that only his inner circle—not Beijing—will have the authority to identify his successor. The Dalai Lama has stated that his successor will be born in a free country, suggesting that the next reincarnation could come from the Tibetan diaspora—around 140,000 people worldwide, with about half residing in India. In response, the Chinese government rejected the Dalai Lama's position. Officials in Beijing stated that the reincarnation of the Dalai Lama, as well as other high-ranking Tibetan Buddhist figures such as the Panchen Lama, must be approved by the central government. According to the Chinese Foreign Ministry, the government holds ultimate authority in confirming the identity of reincarnated Tibetan spiritual leaders.

Samdhong Rinpoche Lobsang Tenzin, a senior leader of the Dalai Lama's trust, affirmed the continuation of the Dalai Lama institution, stating that both a 15th and 16th Dalai Lama would follow. He said the current Dalai Lama would issue guidelines for identifying his successor. Deputy speaker of the parliament of the Central Tibetan Administration Dolma Tsering Teykhang accused China of trying to control the reincarnation process and emphasised the need for the Dalai Lama to address the world directly.

In his book, Voice for the Voiceless, published in 2025, the 14th Dalai Lama said Tibetans worldwide want the institution of the Dalai Lama to continue after his death and specified that his successor would be born in the "free world".

== Social and political stances ==
=== Tibetan independence ===
Despite initially advocating for Tibetan independence from 1961 to 1974, the Dalai Lama no longer supports it. Instead he advocates for more meaningful autonomy for Tibetans within the People's Republic of China. This approach is known as the "Middle Way". In 2005, the 14th Dalai Lama emphasised that Tibet is a part of China, and Tibetan culture and Buddhism are part of Chinese culture. In a speech at Kolkata in 2017, the Dalai Lama stated that Tibetans wanted to stay with China and they did not desire independence. He said that he believed that China after opening up, had changed 40 to 50 per cent of what it was earlier, and that Tibetans wanted to get more development from China. In October 2020, the Dalai Lama stated that he did not support Tibetan independence and hoped to visit China as a Nobel Prize winner. He said "I prefer the concept of a 'republic' in the People's Republic of China. In the concept of republic, ethnic minorities are like Tibetans, The Mongols, Manchus, and Xinjiang Uyghurs, we can live in harmony."

The Tibetan people do not accept the present status of Tibet under the People's Republic of China. At the same time, they do not seek independence for Tibet, which is a historical fact. Treading a middle path in between these two lies the policy and means to achieve a genuine autonomy for all Tibetans living in the three traditional provinces of Tibet within the framework of the People's Republic of China. This is called the Middle-Way Approach, a non-partisan and moderate position that safeguards the vital interests of all concerned parties-for Tibetans: the protection and preservation of their culture, religion and national identity; for the Chinese: the security and territorial integrity of the motherland; and for neighbours and other third parties: peaceful borders and international relations.

=== Ties with India ===
The Dalai Lama maintains close ties with India. In 2008, the Dalai Lama said that Arunachal Pradesh, partially claimed by China, is part of India, citing the disputed 1914 Simla Accord. In 2010 at the International Buddhist Conference in Gujarat, he described himself as a "son of India" and "Tibetan in appearance, but an Indian in spirituality." The newspaper of the Central Committee of the Chinese Communist Party, People's Daily, questioned if the Dalai Lama, by considering himself Indian rather than Chinese, is still entitled to represent Tibetans, alluding to the links between Chinese and Tibetan Buddhism and the Dalai Lama siding with India on southern Tibet. Dhundup Gyalpo, the Dalai Lama's eventual secretary in New Delhi, argued that Tibetan and Chinese peoples have no connections apart from a few culinary dishes and that Chinese Buddhists could also be deemed "Indian in spirituality", because both Tibetan and Chinese Buddhism originated from India.

=== Abortion ===
The Dalai Lama has said that, from the perspective of the Buddhist precepts, abortion is an act of killing. In 1993, he clarified a more nuanced position, stating, "... it depends on the circumstances. If the unborn child will be retarded or if the birth will create serious problems for the parent, these are cases where there can be an exception. I think abortion should be approved or disapproved according to each circumstance."

=== Death penalty ===
The Dalai Lama has repeatedly expressed his opposition to the death penalty, saying that it contradicts the Buddhist philosophy of non-violence and that it expresses anger, not compassion. During a 2005 visit to Japan, a country which has the death penalty, the Dalai Lama called for the abolition of the death penalty and said in his address, "Criminals, people who commit crimes, usually society rejects these people. They are also part of society. Give them some form of punishment to say they were wrong, but show them they are part of society and can change. Show them compassion." The Dalai Lama has also praised US states that have abolished the death penalty.

=== Democracy, nonviolence, religious harmony, and Tibet's relationship with India ===
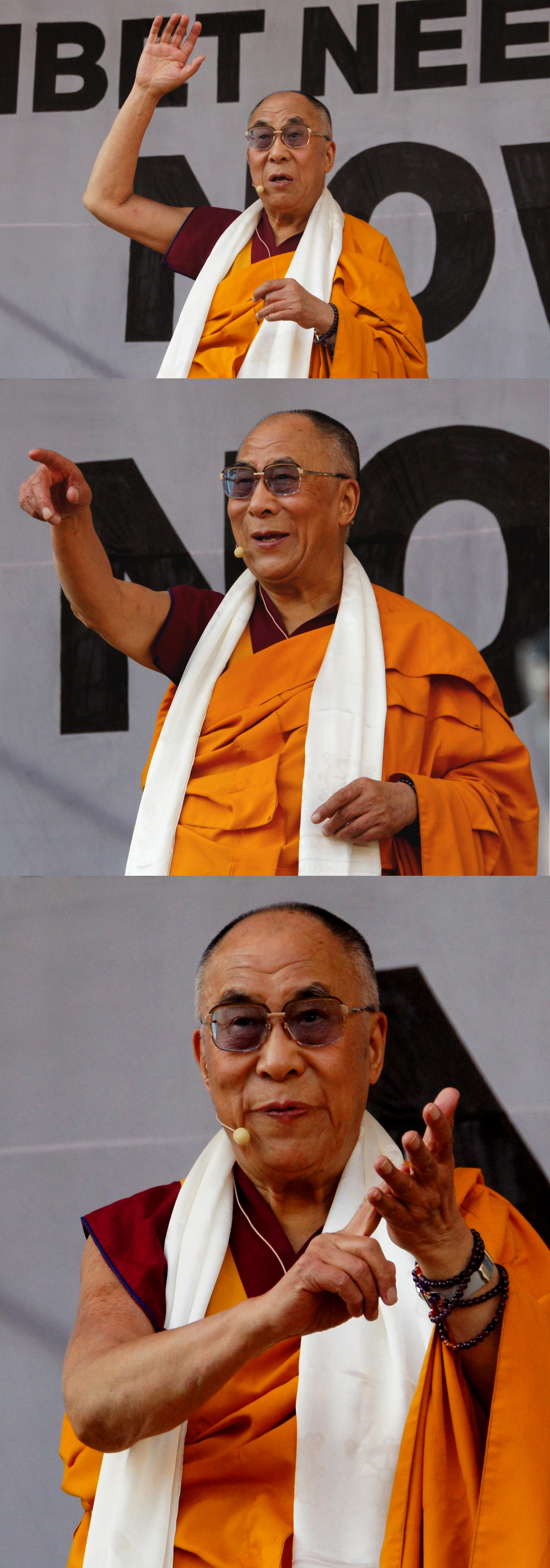
The Dalai Lama in Vienna, Austria, in 2012

The Dalai Lama says that he is active in spreading India's message of nonviolence and religious harmony throughout the world. "I am the messenger of India's ancient thoughts the world over." He has said that democracy has deep roots in India. He says he considers India the master and Tibet its disciple, as great scholars went from India to Tibet to teach Buddhism. He has noted that millions of people lost their lives in violence and the economies of many countries were ruined due to conflicts in the 20th century. "Let the 21st century be a century of tolerance and dialogue."

The Dalai Lama has also critiqued proselytisation and certain types of conversion, believing the practices to be contrary to the fundamental ideas of religious harmony and spiritual practice. He has stated that "It's very important that our religious traditions live in harmony with one another and I don't think proselytizing contributes to this. Just as fighting and killing in the name of religion are very sad, it's not appropriate to use religion as a ground or a means for defeating others." In particular, he has critiqued Christian approaches to conversion in Asia, stating that he has "come across situations where serving the people is a cover for proselytization." The Dalai Lama has labelled such practices counter to the "message of Christ" and has emphasised that such individuals "practice conversion like a kind of war against peoples and cultures." In a statement with Hindu religious leaders, he expressed that he opposes "conversions by any religious tradition using various methods of enticement."

In 1993, the Dalai Lama attended the World Conference on Human Rights and made a speech titled "Human Rights and Universal Responsibility".

In 2001, in response to a question from a Seattle schoolgirl, the Dalai Lama said that it is permissible to shoot someone in self-defence (if the person was "trying to kill you") and he emphasised that the shot should not be fatal.

In 2013, the Dalai Lama criticised Buddhist monks' attacks on Muslims in Myanmar and rejected violence by Buddhists, saying: "Buddha always teaches us about forgiveness, tolerance, compassion. If from one corner of your mind, some emotion makes you want to hit, or want to kill, then please remember Buddha's faith. ... All problems must be solved through dialogue, through talk. The use of violence is outdated, and never solves problems." In May 2013, he said "Really, killing people in the name of religion is unthinkable, very sad." In May 2015, the Dalai Lama called on Myanmar's Nobel Peace Prize winner Aung San Suu Kyi to do more to help the Rohingya Muslims in Myanmar, and said that he had urged Suu Kyi to address the Rohingyas' plight in two previous private meetings and had been rebuffed.

In 2017, after Chinese dissident and Nobel Peace Prize laureate Liu Xiaobo died of organ failure while in Chinese government custody, the Dalai Lama said he was "deeply saddened" and that he believed that Liu's "unceasing efforts in the cause of freedom will bear fruit before long."

The Dalai Lama has consistently praised India. In December 2018, he said Muslim countries like Bangladesh, Pakistan and Syria should learn about religion from India for peace in the world. When asked in 2019 about attacks on the minority community in India including a recent one against a Muslim family in Gurgaon, he said: "There are always a few mischievous people, but that does not mean it a symbol of that nation". He reiterated in December 2021 that he thought India was a role model for religious harmony in the world.

=== Diet and animal welfare ===
People think of animals as if they were vegetables, and that is not right. We have to change the way people think about animals. I encourage the Tibetan people and all people to move toward a vegetarian diet that doesn't cause suffering.

— Dalai Lama

The Dalai Lama advocates compassion for animals and frequently urges people to try vegetarianism or at least reduce their consumption of meat. In Tibet, where historically meat was the most common food, most monks historically have been omnivores, including the Dalai Lamas. The Fourteenth Dalai Lama was raised in a meat-eating family but converted to vegetarianism after arriving in India, where vegetables are much more easily available and vegetarianism is widespread. He spent many years as a vegetarian, but after contracting hepatitis in India and suffering from weakness, his doctors told him to return to eating meat which he now does twice a week. This attracted public attention when, during a visit to the White House, he was offered a vegetarian menu but declined by replying, as he is known to do on occasion when dining in the company of non-vegetarians, "I'm a Tibetan monk, not a vegetarian". His own home kitchen, however, is completely vegetarian.

In 2009, the English singer Paul McCartney wrote a letter to the Dalai Lama inquiring why he was not a vegetarian. As McCartney later told The Guardian, "He wrote back very kindly, saying, 'my doctors tell me that I must eat meat'. And I wrote back again, saying, you know, I don't think that's right. [...] I think now he's vegetarian most of the time. I think he's now being told, the more he meets doctors from the west, that he can get his protein somewhere else. [...] It just doesn't seem right – the Dalai Lama, on the one hand, saying, 'Hey guys, don't harm sentient beings... Oh, and by the way, I'm having a steak.'"

=== Economics and political stance ===
The Dalai Lama has referred to himself as a Marxist and has articulated criticisms of capitalism.

I am not only a socialist but also a bit leftist, a communist. In terms of social economy theory, I am a Marxist. I think I am farther to the left than the Chinese leaders. [Bursts out laughing.] They are capitalists.

He reports hearing of communism when he was very young, but only in the context of the destruction of the Mongolian People's Republic. It was only when he went on his trip to Beijing that he learned about Marxist theory from his interpreter Baba Phuntsog Wangyal of the Tibetan Communist Party. At that time, he reports, "I was so attracted to Marxism, I even expressed my wish to become a Communist Party member", citing his favourite concepts of self-sufficiency and equal distribution of wealth. He does not believe that China implemented "true Marxist policy", and thinks the historical communist states such as the Soviet Union "were far more concerned with their narrow national interests than with the Workers' International". Moreover, he believes one flaw of historically "Marxist regimes" is that they place too much emphasis on destroying the ruling class, and not enough on compassion. He finds Marxism superior to capitalism, believing the latter is only concerned with "how to make profits", whereas the former has "moral ethics". Stating in 1993:

Of all the modern economic theories, the economic system of Marxism is founded on moral principles, while capitalism is concerned only with gain and profitability. Marxism is concerned with the distribution of wealth on an equal basis and the equitable utilisation of the means of production. It is also concerned with the fate of the working classes—that is, the majority—as well as with the fate of those who are underprivileged and in need, and Marxism cares about the victims of minority-imposed exploitation. For those reasons the system appeals to me, and it seems fair. I just recently read an article in a paper where His Holiness the Pope also pointed out some positive aspects of Marxism.

On India–Pakistan relations, the Dalai Lama in October 2019 said: "There is a difference between Indian and Pakistani Prime Minister's speech at the UN. Indian Prime Minister talks about peace, and you know what his Pakistan counterpart said, getting China's political support is Pakistan's compulsion. But Pakistan also needs India. Pakistani leaders should calm down and think beyond emotions and should follow a realistic approach".

=== Environment ===
The Dalai Lama is outspoken in his concerns about environmental problems, frequently giving public talks on themes related to the environment. He has pointed out that many rivers in Asia originate in Tibet, and that the melting of Himalayan glaciers could affect the countries in which the rivers flow. He acknowledged official Chinese laws against deforestation in Tibet, but lamented they can be ignored due to possible corruption. He was quoted as saying "ecology should be part of our daily life"; personally, he takes showers instead of baths, and turns lights off when he leaves a room.

Around 2005, he started campaigning for wildlife conservation, including by issuing a religious ruling against wearing tiger and leopard skins as garments. The Dalai Lama supports the anti-whaling position in the whaling controversy, but has criticised the activities of groups such as the Sea Shepherd Conservation Society (which carries out acts of what it calls aggressive nonviolence against property). Before the 2009 United Nations Climate Change Conference, he urged national leaders to put aside domestic concerns and take collective action against climate change.

=== Sexuality ===
The Dalai Lama's stances on topics of sexuality have changed over time.

A monk since childhood, the Dalai Lama has said that sex offers fleeting satisfaction and leads to trouble later, while chastity offers a better life and "more independence, more freedom". He has said that problems arising from conjugal life sometimes even lead to suicide or murder. He has asserted that all religions have the same view about adultery.

In his discussions of the traditional Buddhist view on appropriate sexual behaviour, he explains the concept of "right organ in the right object at the right time", which historically has been interpreted as indicating that oral, manual and anal sex (both homosexual and heterosexual) are not appropriate in Buddhism or for Buddhists. However, he also says that in modern times all common, consensual sexual practices that do not cause harm to others are ethically acceptable and that society should accept and respect people who are gay or transgender from a secular point of view. In a 1994 interview with OUT Magazine, the Dalai Lama clarified his personal opinion on the matter by saying, "If someone comes to me and asks whether homosexuality is okay or not, I will ask 'What is your companion's opinion?' If you both agree, then I think I would say, 'If two males or two females voluntarily agree to have mutual satisfaction without further implication of harming others, then it is okay.'" However, when interviewed by Canadian TV news anchor Evan Solomon on CBC News: Sunday about whether homosexuality is acceptable in Buddhism, the Dalai Lama responded that "it is sexual misconduct".

In his 1996 book Beyond Dogma, he described a traditional Buddhist definition of an appropriate sexual act as follows: "A sexual act is deemed proper when the couples use the organs intended for sexual intercourse and nothing else ... Homosexuality, whether it is between men or between women, is not improper in itself. What is improper is the use of organs already defined as inappropriate for sexual contact." He elaborated in 1997, conceding that the basis of that teaching was unknown to him. He also conveyed his own "willingness to consider the possibility that some of the teachings may be specific to a particular cultural and historic context".

In 2006, the Dalai Lama has expressed concern at "reports of violence and discrimination against" LGBTQ people and urged "respect, tolerance and the full recognition of human rights for all".

In a 2014 interview with Larry King, the Dalai Lama expressed that same-sex marriage is a personal issue, can be ethically socially accepted, and that he personally accepts it. However, he also stated that if same-sex marriage is in contradiction with one's chosen traditions, then they should not follow it.

=== Women's rights ===
In 2007, he said that the next Dalai Lama could possibly be a woman: "If a woman reveals herself as more useful the lama could very well be reincarnated in this form."

In 2009, on gender equality and sexism, the Dalai Lama proclaimed at the National Civil Rights Museum in Memphis, Tennessee: "I call myself a feminist. Isn't that what you call someone who fights for women's rights?" He also said that by nature, women are more compassionate based on their biology and capacity for reproduction and maternal care. He called on women to "lead and create a more compassionate world", citing the good works of nurses and mothers.

At a 2014 appearance at the Tata Institute of Social Sciences in Mumbai, the Dalai Lama said, "Since women have been shown to be more sensitive to others' suffering, their leadership may be more effective."

In 2015 the Dalai Lama said in a BBC interview that if a female were to succeed him, "that female must be attractive, otherwise it is not much use." When asked if he was joking, he replied, "No. True!" The Dalai Lama followed with a joke about his success being due to his own appearance. His office later released a statement of apology citing the interaction as a translation error. In 2019 the Dalai Lama said during another interview with the BBC that if a female Dalai Lama were not attractive, "people, I think, prefer not see her...that face."

=== Health ===
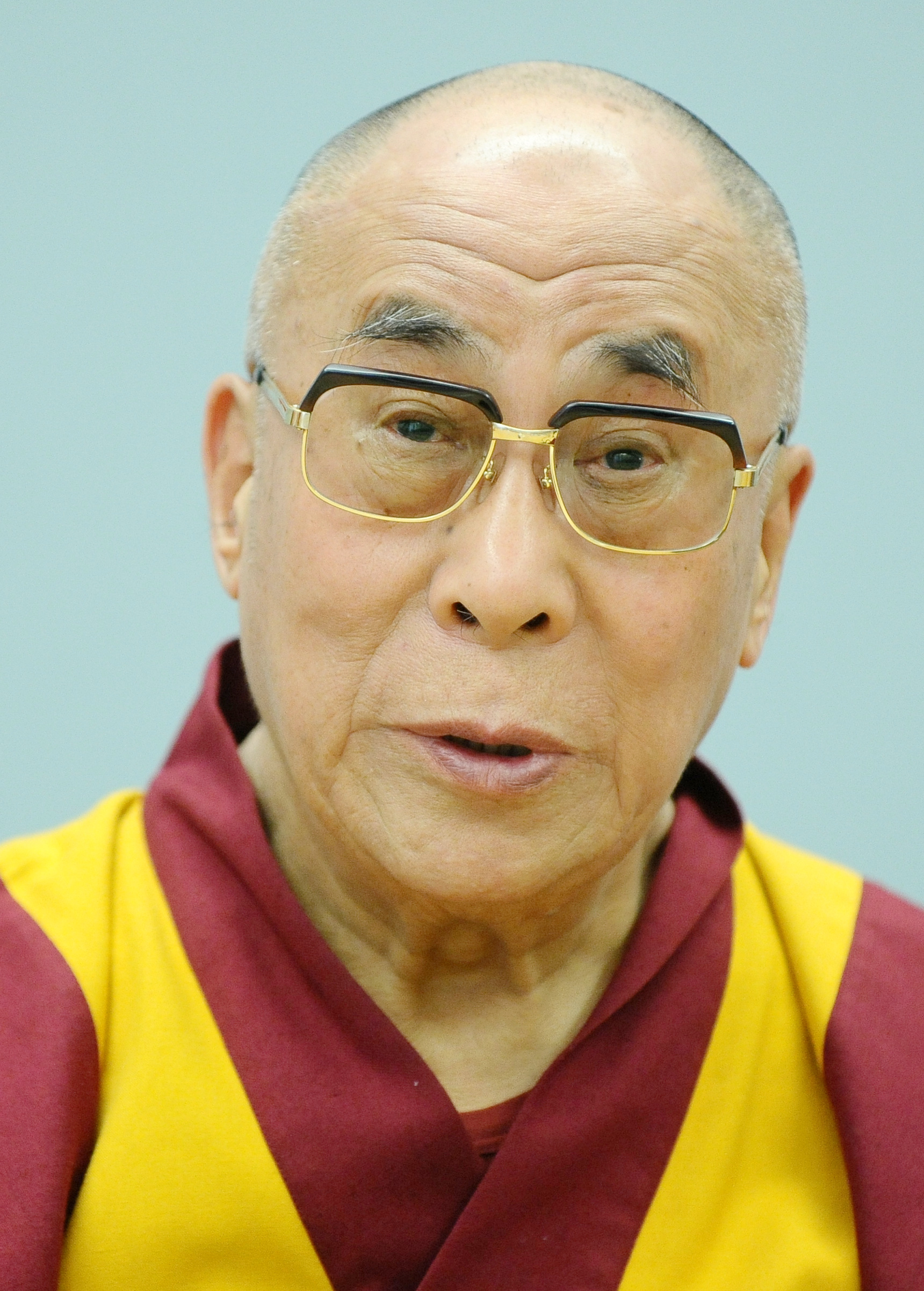
The 14th Dalai Lama in Trento in 2013

In 2013, at the Culture of Compassion event in Derry, Northern Ireland, the Dalai Lama said that "Warm-heartedness is a key factor for healthy individuals, healthy families and healthy communities."

==== Response to COVID-19 ====
In a 2020 statement in Time magazine on the COVID-19 pandemic, the Dalai Lama said that the pandemic must be combated with compassion, empirical science, prayer, and the courage of healthcare workers. He emphasised "emotional disarmament" (seeing things with a clear and realistic perspective, without fear or rage) and wrote: "The outbreak of this terrible coronavirus has shown that what happens to one person can soon affect every other being. But it also reminds us that a compassionate or constructive act – whether working in hospitals or just observing social distancing – has the potential to help many."

=== Immigration ===
In September 2018, speaking at a conference in Malmö, Sweden, the Dalai Lama said "I think Europe belongs to the Europeans", but also that Europe was "morally responsible" for helping "a refugee really facing danger against their life". He stated that Europe has a responsibility to refugees to "receive them, help them, educate them", but that they should aim to return to their places of origin and that "they ultimately should rebuild their own country".

Speaking to German reporters in 2016, the Dalai Lama said there are "too many" refugees in Europe, adding that "Europe, for example Germany, cannot become an Arab country." He also said that "Germany is Germany".

=== Dorje Shugden controversy ===
Dorje Shugden is an entity in Tibetan Buddhism that, since the 1930s, has become a point of contention over whether to include or exclude certain non-Gelug teachings. After the 1975 publication of the Yellow Book containing stories about Dorje Shugden acting wrathfully against Gelugpas who also practised Nyingma, the 14th Dalai Lama, himself a Gelugpa and advocate of an inclusive approach, publicly renounced the practice of Dorje Shugden. Several groups broke away as a result, notably the New Kadampa Tradition (NKT). According to Tibetologists, the Dalai Lama's disapproval has reduced the prevalence of Shugden sects among Tibetans in China and India. Shugden devotees have since complained about being ostracised when trying to get jobs or receive services. The Dalai Lama's supporters expressed that any discrimination is neither systematic nor encouraged by him. Some Shugden movements such as the NKT have organised demonstrations as a form of protest. Some journalists have suggested that the Chinese government has taken advantage of the controversy. The group disbanded in 2016. His office said that there was no ban or discrimination against Shugden worshippers.

=== CIA Tibetan program ===
In October 1998, the Dalai Lama's administration acknowledged that it received $1.7 million a year in the 1960s from the US government through a Central Intelligence Agency program. When asked by CIA officer John Kenneth Knaus in 1995 to comment on the CIA Tibetan program, the Dalai Lama replied that though it helped the morale of those resisting the Chinese, "thousands of lives were lost in the resistance" and further, that "the U.S. Government had involved itself in his country's affairs not to help Tibet but only as a Cold War tactic to challenge the Chinese." As part of the program the Dalai Lama received 180,000 dollars a year from 1959 till 1974 for his own personal use.

His administration's reception of CIA funding has become one of the grounds for some state-run Chinese newspapers to discredit him along with the Tibetan independence movement.

In his autobiography Freedom in Exile, the Dalai Lama criticised the CIA again for supporting the Tibetan independence movement "not because they (the CIA) cared about Tibetan independence, but as part of their worldwide efforts to destabilize all communist governments".

In 1999, the Dalai Lama said that the CIA Tibetan program had been harmful for Tibet because it was primarily aimed at serving American interests, and "once the American policy toward China changed, they stopped their help."

== Public image ==
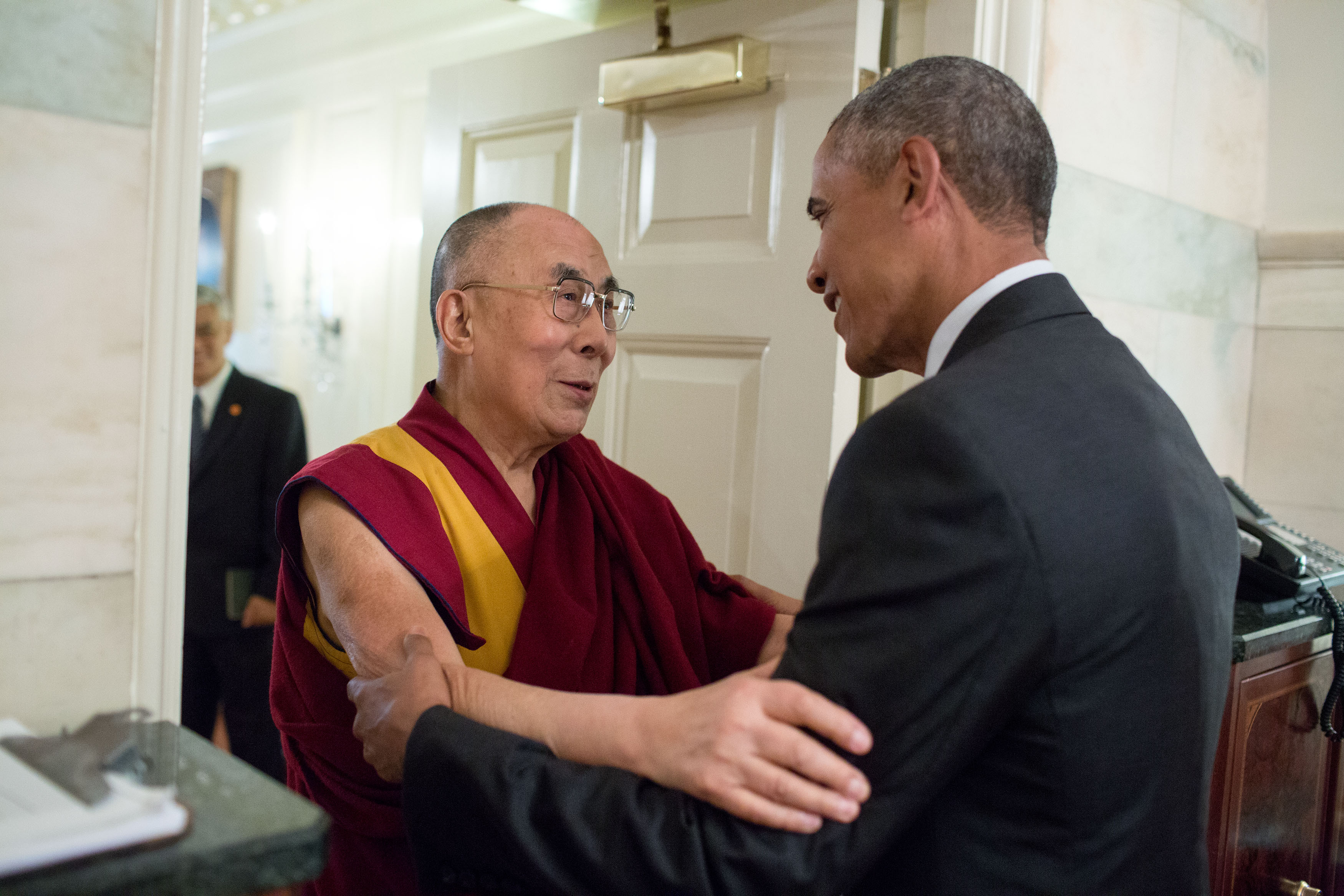
The Dalai Lama meeting with US President Barack Obama in 2016

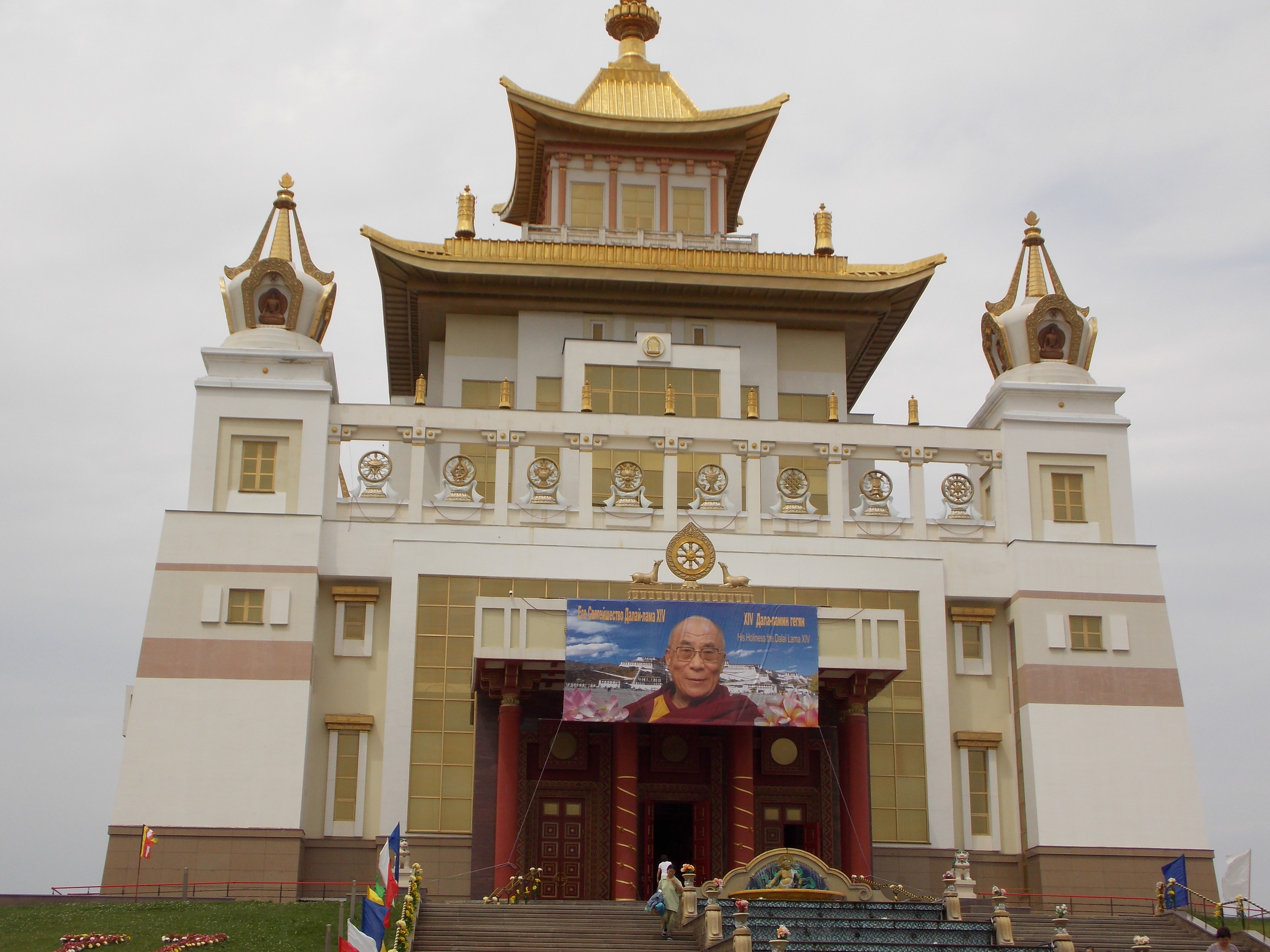
Buddhist temple in Kalmykia, Russia

In 2020 the Dalai Lama placed highly in global surveys of the world's most admired men, ranking with Pope Francis as among the world's religious leaders cited as the most admired.

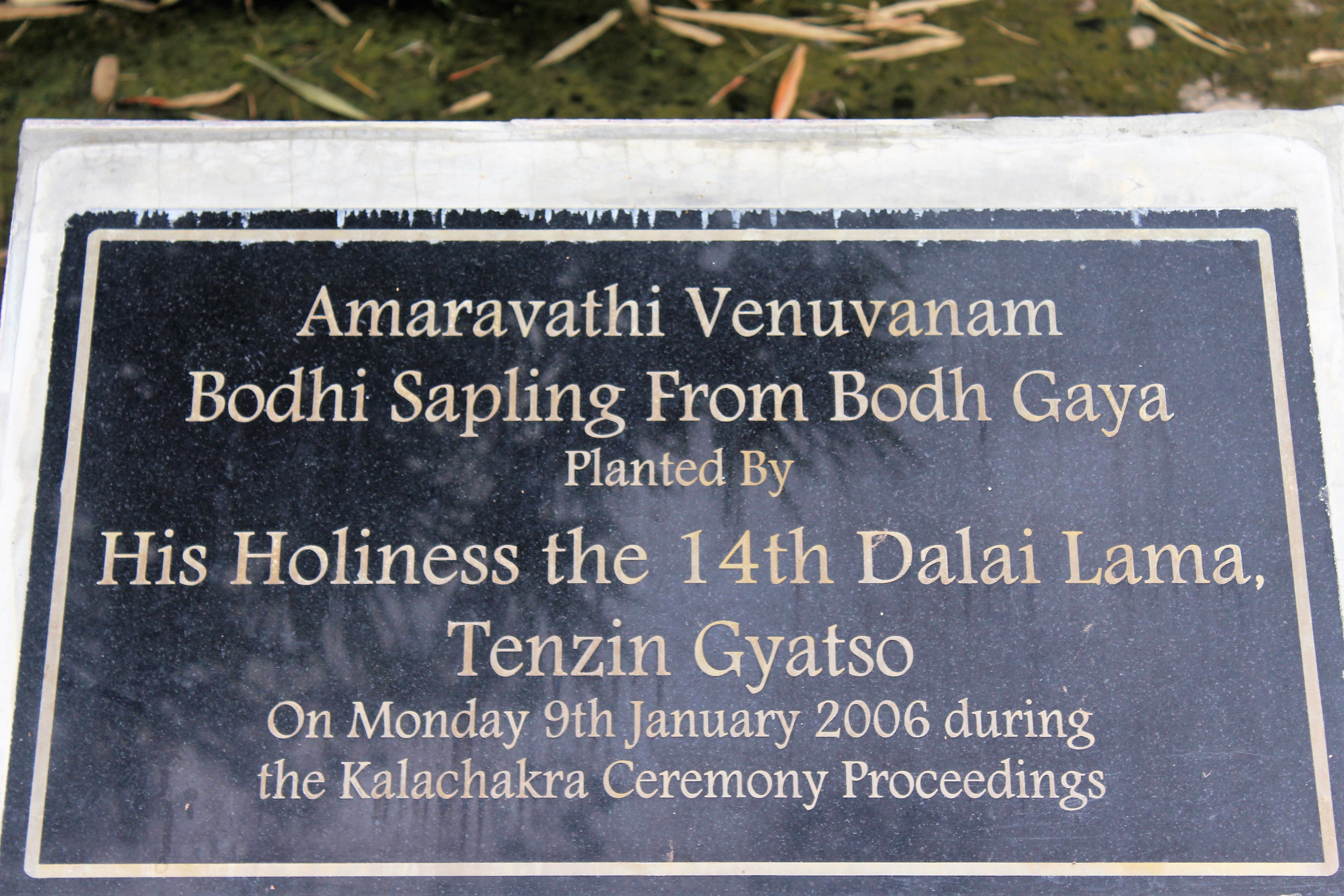
Stone plaque at a plantation by Tenzin in Amaravathi

The Dalai Lama's appeal is variously ascribed to his charismatic personality, international fascination with Buddhism, his universalist values, and international sympathy for the Tibetans. In the 1990s, many films were released by the American film industry about Tibet, including biopics of the Dalai Lama. This is attributed to both the Dalai Lama's 1989 Nobel Peace Prize as well as to the euphoria following the Fall of Communism. The most notable films, Kundun and Seven Years in Tibet (both released in 1997), portrayed "an idyllic pre-1950 Tibet, with a smiling, soft-spoken Dalai Lama at the helm—a Dalai Lama sworn to non-violence": portrayals the Chinese government decried as ahistorical.

The Dalai Lama has his own pages on Twitter, Facebook and Instagram.

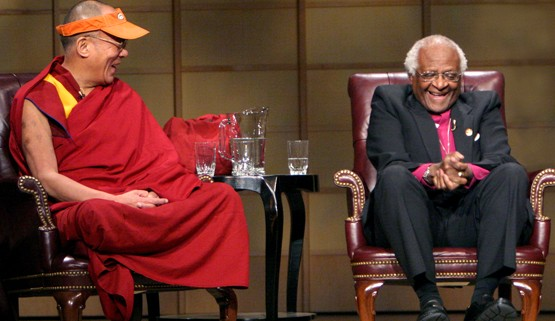
The Dalai Lama with Bishop Desmond Tutu in 2004

The Dalai Lama has tried to mobilise international support for Tibetan activities. The Dalai Lama has been successful in gaining Western support for himself and the cause of greater Tibetan autonomy, including vocal support from numerous Hollywood celebrities, most notably the actors Richard Gere and Steven Seagal, as well as lawmakers from several major countries. Photos of the Dalai Lama were banned after March 1959 Lhasa protests until after the end of the Cultural Revolution in 1976. In 1996 the Chinese Communist Party once again reinstated the total prohibition of any photo of the 14th Dalai Lama. According to the Tibet Information Network, "authorities in Tibet have begun banning photographs of the exiled Dalai Lama in monasteries and public places, according to reports from a monitoring group and a Tibetan newspaper. Plainclothes police went to hotels and restaurants in Lhasa, the Tibetan capital, on 22 and 23 April and ordered Tibetans to remove pictures of the Dalai Lama ..." The ban continues in many locations throughout Tibet today.

=== In the media ===
The 14th Dalai Lama has appeared in several non-fiction films including:

- 10 Questions for the Dalai Lama (2006, documentary)
- Dalai Lama Renaissance (2007, documentary)
- The Sun Behind the Clouds (2010)
- Bringing Tibet Home (2013)
- Monk with a Camera (2014, documentary)
- Dalai Lama Awakening (2014)
- Compassion in Action (2014)

He has been depicted as a character in various other movies and television programs including:

- Kundun, 1997 film directed by Martin Scorsese
- Seven Years in Tibet, 1997 film starring Brad Pitt and David Thewlis
- Klovn "Dalai Lama" Season 1, Episode 4 (2005)
- Red Dwarf episode "Meltdown" (1991)
- Song of Tibet, 2000 film directed by Xie Fei.
- The Great Escape "14th Dalai Lama" (2018) on Epic
- "Dalai Lama", episode of the Indian television series Mega Icons (2019–20) on National Geographic.

In popular media, the Dalai Lama appeared on the HBO late-night talk show Last Week Tonight with John Oliver on 5 March 2017, where he discussed issues including Tibetan sovereignty, Tibetan self-immolations, and his succession plans.

A biographical graphic novel, Man of Peace, also envisaging the Dalai Lama's return to Tibet, was published by Tibet House US. The Extraordinary Life of His Holiness the Fourteenth Dalai Lama: An Illuminated Journey, illustrations and text by artist Rima Fujita, narrated by the Dalai Lama, was published by Simon and Schuster in 2021.

=== Awards and honours ===
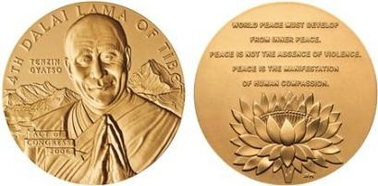
The Congressional Gold Medal was awarded to Tenzin Gyatso in 2007.

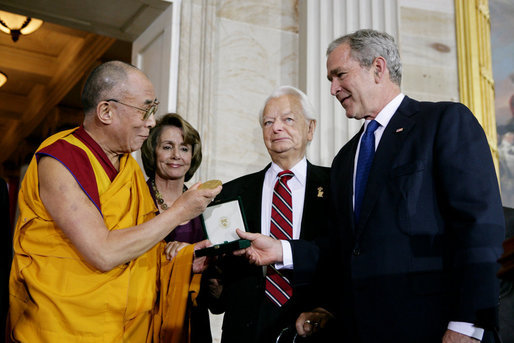
The Dalai Lama receiving a Congressional Gold Medal in 2007. From left: Speaker of the United States House of Representatives Nancy Pelosi, Senate President pro tempore Robert Byrd and US President George W. Bush

The Dalai Lama has received numerous awards and honours worldwide over his spiritual and political career. For a more complete list see Awards and honours presented to the 14th Dalai Lama.

After the 1989 Tiananmen Square protests and massacre, the Norwegian Nobel Committee awarded him the 1989 Nobel Peace Prize. The Committee officially gave the prize to the Dalai Lama for "the struggle of the liberation of Tibet and the efforts for a peaceful resolution" and "in part a tribute to the memory of Mahatma Gandhi".

He has also been awarded the:

- 1959 Ramon Magsaysay Award for Community Leadership;
- 1994 Freedom Medal from the Roosevelt Institute;
- 1994 Wallenberg Medal from the University of Michigan;
- 2005 Christmas Humphreys Award from the Buddhist Society in the United Kingdom;
- 2007 Congressional Gold Medal, the highest civilian award bestowed by the American Congress and President. The Chinese government declared this would have "an extremely serious impact" on relations with the United States;
- 2006 Order of the White Lotus by the Republic of Kalmykia for outstanding services and significant contribution to the spiritual revival and prosperity of the republic.
- 2007 Ahimsa Award from the Institute of Jainology in recognition of individuals who embody and promote the principles of Ahimsa (Non-violence); and in
- 2012, Order of the Republic of Tuva by the Tuvan Republic in recognition of the contribution to the upbringing of high spiritual and cultural tolerance, strengthening interreligious and interethnic harmony.
- 2012, the Templeton Prize. He donated the prize money to the charity Save the Children.

In 2006, he became one of only six people ever to be granted Honorary Citizenship of Canada. In 2007 he was named Presidential Distinguished Professor at Emory University in Atlanta, Georgia, the first time he accepted a university appointment. He is the chief Patron of the Maha Bodhi Society of India, conferred upon him at the 2008 Annual General Meeting of the Maha Bodhi Society of India. At the 68th Annual Grammy Awards, he won the Grammy Award for Best Audio Book, Narration & Storytelling Recording.

=== "Suck my tongue" incident ===
Footage of Dalai Lama's controversial encounter with an Indian schoolboy in 2023

In a February 2023 video, the Dalai Lama was seen kissing a boy on the lips and asking the child to suck his tongue. The incident took place at his temple in Dharamshala, Himachal Pradesh, India. Nearly 100 students were in attendance, as well as the boy's mother, a trustee of the event's organiser. Her son had requested a hug from the Dalai Lama, who then asked for and received a kiss from the child, pulling him closer to touch lips. After a pause, the Dalai Lama said "suck my tongue" and, with his tongue out, leaned toward the boy, who appeared nervous and withdrew after sticking out his own tongue. In an interview clip released by Voice of Tibet, the boy later said it had been a "good experience" meeting the Dalai Lama, from whom he received a lot of "positive energy".

The interaction was originally recorded by Voice of America, which posted the footage after editing out the "suck my tongue" part. The removed portion of the clip resurfaced in April 2023, and the Dalai Lama's conduct received negative media coverage. Some victim groups and media commentators raised concerns of "child abuse", while the Tibetan Legal Association warned four Indian news outlets to retract parts of their reporting.

The office of His Holiness issued a statement saying that the Dalai Lama often teases "in an innocent and playful way", adding that he "wishes to apologize to the boy and his family ... for the hurt his words may have caused" and "regrets the incident". Penpa Tsering, the political leader of the Central Tibetan Administration, called the gesture an "innocent grandfatherly affectionate demeanour" followed by a "jovial prank" with a tongue. He and other Tibetans accused "pro-Chinese sources" of being behind the video but have not provided any evidence.

Some academics, Tibetan leaders and cultural groups described the situation as a cultural misunderstanding. They mentioned that sticking out one's tongue is a form of traditional Tibetan greeting to show respect or agreement, stemming from a tradition of performing the gesture to demonstrate that one is not reincarnated from the malevolent king Langdarma, who was said to have a black tongue. The practice is not known to involve "sucking", however. David Germano, a Tibetologist at the University of Virginia, suggested that the Dalai Lama's limited English proficiency led him to mistranslate a Tibetan expression that means "eat my tongue." Germano said, "The context as I understand it is that when grandparents play with kids they are communicating that I have given you every sweet or treat I have, and now I have none left, so you can eat my tongue!" The HAQ Centre for Child Rights in New Delhi said the video was "certainly not about any cultural expression and even if it is, such cultural expressions are not acceptable."

The controversy also drew attention to past incidents where the Dalai Lama caressed the arm of a disabled girl sitting next to him and touched Lady Gaga's knee through her torn trousers before the star laughed.

== Publications ==
- My Land and My People: The Autobiography of His Holiness the Dalai Lama. Ed. David Howarth. Weidenfeld and Nicolson, 1962. ISBN 978-0-446-67421-8
- Deity Yoga: In Action and Performance Tantras. Ed. and trans. Jeffrey Hopkins. Snow Lion, 1987. ISBN 978-0-93793-850-8
- Tantra in Tibet. Co-authored with Tsong-kha-pa, Jeffrey Hopkins. Snow Lion, 1987. ISBN 978-0-93793-849-2
- The Dalai Lama at Harvard. Ed. and trans. Jeffrey Hopkins. Snow Lion, 1988. ISBN 978-0-93793-871-3
- Freedom in Exile: The Autobiography of the Dalai Lama, London: Little, Brown and Co., 1990, ISBN 978-0-349-10462-1
- My Tibet, co-authored with photographer Galen Rowell, 1990, ISBN 978-0-520-08948-8
- The Path to Enlightenment. Ed. and trans. Glenn H. Mullin. Snow Lion, 1994. ISBN 978-1-55939-032-3
- Essential Teachings, North Atlantic Books, 1995, ISBN 978-1-55643-192-0
- The World of Tibetan Buddhism, translated by Geshe Thupten Jinpa, foreword by Richard Gere, Wisdom Publications, 1995, ISBN 978-0-86171-100-0
- Tibetan Portrait: The Power of Compassion, photographs by Phil Borges with sayings by Tenzin Gyatso, 1996, ISBN 978-0-8478-1957-7
- Healing Anger: The Power of Patience from a Buddhist Perspective. Trans. Thupten Jinpa. Ithaca, NY: Snow Lion, 1997, ISBN 978-1-55939-073-6
- The Gelug/Kagyü Tradition of Mahamudra, co-authored with Alexander Berzin. Ithaca, NY: Snow Lion Publications, 1997, ISBN 978-1-55939-072-9
- The Art of Happiness, co-authored with Howard C. Cutler, M.D., Riverhead Books, 1998, ISBN 978-0-9656682-9-3
- The Good Heart – A Buddhist Perspective on the Teachings of Jesus, translated by Geshe Thupten Jinpa, Wisdom Publications, 1998, ISBN 978-0-86171-138-3
- Kalachakra Tantra: Rite of Initiation, edited by Jeffrey Hopkins, Wisdom Publications, 1999, ISBN 978-0-86171-151-2
- MindScience: An East–West Dialogue, with contributions by Herbert Benson, Daniel Goleman, Robert Thurman, and Howard Gardner, Wisdom Publications, 1999, ISBN 978-0-86171-066-9
- The Power of Buddhism, co-authored with Jean-Claude Carrière, 1999, ISBN 978-0-7171-2803-7
- Opening the Eye of New Awareness, Translated by Donald S. Lopez Jr., Wisdom Publications, 1999, ISBN 978-0-86171-155-0
- Ethics for the New Millennium, Riverhead Books, 1999, ISBN 978-1-57322-883-1
- Consciousness at the Crossroads. Ed. Zara Houshmand, Robert B. Livingston, B. Alan Wallace. Trans. Thupten Jinpa, B. Alan Wallace. Snow Lion, 1999. ISBN 978-1-55939-127-6
- Ancient Wisdom, Modern World: Ethics for the New Millennium, Little, Brown/Abacus Press, 2000, ISBN 978-0-349-11443-9
- Dzogchen: Heart Essence of the Great Perfection, translated by Geshe Thupten Jinpa and Richard Barron, Snow Lion Publications, 2000, ISBN 978-1-55939-219-8
- The Meaning of Life: Buddhist Perspectives on Cause and Effect, translated by Jeffrey Hopkins, Wisdom Publications, 2000, ISBN 978-0-86171-173-4
- Answers: Discussions with Western Buddhists. Ed. and trans. Jose Cabezon. Snow Lion, 2001. ISBN 978-1-55939-162-7
- The Compassionate Life, Wisdom Publications, 2001, ISBN 978-0-86171-378-3
- Violence and Compassion: Dialogues on Life Today, with Jean-Claude Carriere, Doubleday, 2001, ISBN 978-0-385-50144-6
- Imagine All the People: A Conversation with the Dalai Lama on Money, Politics, and Life as it Could Be, Coauthored with Fabien Ouaki, Wisdom Publications, 2001, ISBN 978-0-86171-150-5
- An Open Heart, edited by Nicholas Vreeland; Little, Brown; 2001, ISBN 978-0-316-98979-4
- The Heart of Compassion: A Practical Approach to a Meaningful Life, Twin Lakes, Wisconsin: Lotus Press, 2002, ISBN 978-0-940985-36-0
- Sleeping, Dreaming, and Dying, edited by Francisco Varela, Wisdom Publications, 2002, ISBN 978-0-86171-123-9
- Essence of the Heart Sutra: The Dalai Lama's Heart of Wisdom Teachings, edited by Geshe Thupten Jinpa, Wisdom Publications, 2002, ISBN 978-0-86171-284-7
- The Pocket Dalai Lama. Ed. Mary Craig. Shambhala Pocket Classics, 2002. ISBN 978-1-59030-001-5
- The Buddhism of Tibet. Ed. and trans. Jeffrey Hopkins, Anne C. Klein. Snow Lion, 2002. ISBN 978-1-55939-185-6
- The Art of Happiness at Work, co-authored with Howard C. Cutler, M.D., Riverhead, 2003, ISBN 978-1-59448-054-6
- Stages of Meditation (commentary on the Bhāvanākrama). Trans. Ven. Geshe Lobsang Jordhen, Losang Choephel Ganchenpa, Jeremy Russell. Snow Lion, 2003. ISBN 978-1-55939-197-9
- Der Weg des Herzens. Gewaltlosigkeit und Dialog zwischen den Religionen (The Path of the Heart: Non-violence and the Dialogue among Religions), co-authored with Eugen Drewermann, PhD, Patmos Verlag, 2003, ISBN 978-3-491-69078-3
- The Path to Bliss. Ed. and trans. Thupten Jinpa, Christine Cox. Snow Lion, 2003. ISBN 978-1-55939-190-0
- How to Practice: The Way to a Meaningful Life, translated and edited by Jeffrey Hopkins, 2003, ISBN 978-0-7434-5336-3
- The Wisdom of Forgiveness: Intimate Conversations and Journeys, coauthored with Victor Chan, Riverbed Books, 2004, ISBN 978-1-57322-277-8
- The New Physics and Cosmology: Dialogues with the Dalai Lama, edited by Arthur Zajonc, with contributions by David Finkelstein, George Greenstein, Piet Hut, Tu Wei-ming, Anton Zeilinger, B. Alan Wallace and Thupten Jinpa, Oxford University Press, 2004, ISBN 978-0-19-515994-3
- Dzogchen: The Heart Essence of the Great Perfection. Ed. Patrick Gaffney. Trans. Thupten Jinpa, Richard Barron (Chokyi Nyima). Snow Lion, 2004. ISBN 978-1-55939-219-8
- Practicing Wisdom: The Perfection of Shantideva's Bodhisattva Way, translated by Geshe Thupten Jinpa, Wisdom Publications, 2004, ISBN 978-0-86171-182-6
- Lighting the Way. Snow Lion, 2005. ISBN 978-1-55939-228-0
- The Universe in a Single Atom: The Convergence of Science and Spirituality, Morgan Road Books, 2005, ISBN 978-0-7679-2066-7
- How to Expand Love: Widening the Circle of Loving Relationships, translated and edited by Jeffrey Hopkins, Atria Books, 2005, ISBN 978-0-7432-6968-1
- The Tibetan Book of the Dead, translated and edited by Gyurnme Dorje, Graham Coleman, and Thupten Jinpa, introductory commentary by the 14th Dalai Lama, Viking Press, 2005, ISBN 978-0-670-85886-6
- Living Wisdom with His Holiness the Dalai Lama, with Don Farber, Sounds True, 2006, ISBN 978-1-59179-457-8
- Mind in Comfort and Ease: The Vision of Enlightenment in the Great Perfection. Ed. Patrick Gaffney. Trans. Matthieu Ricard, Richard Barron and Adam Pearcey. Wisdom Publications, 2007, ISBN 978-0-86171-493-3
- How to See Yourself as You Really Are, translated and edited by Jeffrey Hopkins, 2007, ISBN 978-0-7432-9045-6
- The Leader's Way, co-authored with Laurens van den Muyzenberg, Nicholas Brealey Publishing, 2008, ISBN 978-1-85788-511-8
- My Spiritual Autobiography compiled by Sofia Stril-Rever from speeches and interviews of the 14th Dalai Lama, 2009, ISBN 978-1-84604-242-3
- Beyond Religion: Ethics for a Whole World, Mariner Books, 2012, ISBN 978-0-547-84428-2
- The Wisdom of Compassion: Stories of Remarkable Encounters and Timeless Insights, coauthored with Victor Chan, Riverhead Books, 2012, ISBN 978-0-552-16923-3
- My Appeal to the World, presented by Sofia Stril-Rever, translated from the French by Sebastian Houssiaux, Tibet House US, 2015, ISBN 978-0-9670115-6-1
- The Book of Joy: Lasting Happiness in a Changing World, coauthored by Archbishop Desmond Tutu, 2016, ISBN 978-0-67007-016-9
- Behind the Smile: The Hidden Side of the Dalai Lama, by Maxime Vivas (author), translated from the French book Not So Zen, Long River Press 2013, ISBN 978-1-59265-140-5
- Voice for the Voiceless: Over Seven Decades of Struggle With China for My Land and My People (2025)
- Dreams of a White Snow Lion: The Remarkable Life, Vision, and Deeds of the Dalai Lama, foreword by the Dalai Lama, by Sherab Dhargye and Mariateresa Bianca, Shambhala Publications, 2026, ISBN 978-1-64547-541-5

== Discography ==
=== Studio albums ===
Title	Album details	Peak chart positions		
Title	Album details	GER	SWI	US World
Inner World	Released: 6 July 2020; Label: Khandro; Format: LP, digital download, streaming	88	18	8

=== Singles ===
Title	Year	Album
"Compassion"	2020	Inner World

== See also ==
- Bibliography of the history of Tibet
- Awards and honours presented to the 14th Dalai Lama
- Dalai Lama Center for Peace and Education
- Foundation for Universal Responsibility of His Holiness the Dalai Lama
- Golden Urn
- History of Tibet (1950–present)
  - Annexation of Tibet by the People's Republic of China
  - Chinese occupation of Tibet
  - Human rights in Tibet
  - Period of de facto Tibetan independence
  - Protests and uprisings in Tibet since 1950
  - Sinicization of Tibet
- List of organisations of Tibetans in exile
- List of peace activists
- List of Nobel laureates
- List of refugees
- List of rulers of Tibet
- Mind & Life Institute
  - Freedom of religion in China
- Religious persecution
- Templeton Prize lauretes
- Tibet Religious Foundation of His Holiness the Dalai Lama
- Tibetan Centre for Human Rights and Democracy
- Tibetan culture
- Tibetan Institute of Performing Arts

== Notes ==
14th Dalai Lama Dalai Lama Born: 6 July 1935
Buddhist titles
Preceded by Thubten Gyatso	Dalai Lama; 1935–present Recognised in 1937; enthroned in 1940	Incumbent; Heir: 15th Dalai Lama
Political offices
Preceded by Ngawang Sungrab Thutob; Regent	Ruler of Tibet; 1950–1959; Part of the People's Republic of China from 1951	fled to India during the 1959 rebellion
New office	Director of the Preparatory Committee for the Tibet Autonomous Region; 1956–1959	Succeeded by Choekyi Gyaltsen, 10th Panchen Erdeni as Acting Director
New office	Head of state of the Central Tibetan Administration; 1959–2012	Succeeded by Lobsang Sangay as Sikyong
Awards and achievements
Preceded by United Nations; Peacekeeping Forces	Laureate of the Nobel Peace Prize; 1989	Succeeded by Mikhail Gorbachev
