= Timeline of Tibetan history =

A brief chronology of the history of Tibet:

== Chronology ==
Year	Notes
173 AD	Birth of Thothori Nyantsen, 28th King of Tibet.
233	Nyantsen receives a Buddhist scripture, marking the initial introduction of Buddhism into Tibet (Currency from this event was dated).
618–650	Reign of Songtsen Gampo, 33rd king. He sends scholars to India to study Sanskrit and a Tibetan script is devised.
640	Tibet invades and occupies Nepal.
641	Marriage of Gampo to Tang Chinese Princess Wencheng. They spread Buddhism in Tibet and found Jokhang.
645	Gampo sends a minister to the Court of Tang China requesting permission to build a temple on Mount Wutai in Shanxi Province which is granted.
654–676	Tibetan Empire conquest of Tu-yu-lun state and annexation of Chinese territories in Central Asia.
704	Tride Tsugtsen (died 755) becomes king.
710	Tsugtsen marries Tang Chinese princess Chin-Cheng.
717	The Tibetans (according to an 11th-century Chinese history) join with the Turkic Türgish to attack Kashgar.
720	Tibetan troops take Uighur principality of 'Bug-cor in the Dunhuang oasis.
755–797	Reign of Trisong Detsen, Tsugtsen's son. Reconquest of Central Asia
763	Tibetans invade the Tang Chinese capital of Chang'an and withdraw 15 days later.
779	Establishment of Samye Monastery. Buddhism officially recognised as state religion.
783	Peace treaty signed with Tang China.
785–805	Tibetan army advances westward to the Pamirs and Oxus River.
797	Muni Tsangpo, Trisong Detsen's son, becomes king.
799–815	Reign of Sadneleg
815–836	Reign of Ralpachen, son of Sadneleg. Great translation of Buddhist texts conducted during this period.
821	Changqing Treaty of Alliance with Tang China, Tibet retains most of Central Asian territories.
823	The contents of the Changqing Treaty were engraved on a monument placed in front of Jokhang. The monument says "[Dang dynasty and Tibet] have two emperors but consult issues as one country" (舅甥二主，商议社稷如一，结立大和盟约，永无渝替)
836–842	Reign of Lang Darma, brother of Ralpachen. Supporter of the traditional Tibetan religion of Bon, he dismantles the burgeoning political power of the Buddhist establishments, but there is no evidence that he persecutes Buddhists as some Buddhist historians have alleged.
842	Lang Darma ritually murdered by a Buddhist monk. Struggle for power and fragmentation ensues with constant warring and allying.
978	Rinchen Zangpo, the great translator invites Indian teachers into western Tibet and a Buddhism renaissance begins, with monasteries established in the west.
1040	Birth of Milarepa (died 1123), great Tibetan poet and mystic. Chetsun Sherab Jungnay founds Shalu Monastery which becomes renowned as a centre of scholarly learning and psychic training.
1042	Atiśa (died 1054), a great Mahayana teacher from India, arrives in Tibet and conducts missionary activities.
1057	Establishment of Reting Monastery.
1071	Founding of Sakya Monastery.
1182	Birth of Sakya Pandita (died 1251), learned scholar of the Sakya sect.
1207	Tibetans send delegation to Genghis Khan and establish friendly relations.
1227	Death of Genghis Khan.
1240s–50s	Mongol invasions of Tibet.
1244	Sakya Pandita invited to meet Mongol Khan and invested with temporal power over Tibet.
1260	Kublai Khan grants Pandit's nephew Drogön Chögyal Phagpa (1235–1280) the title of State Preceptor and supreme authority over Tibet, re-establishing religious and political relations with the Mongols.
1270	Phagpa received the title of Imperial Preceptor from Kublai Khan. Beginning of Yuan rule of Tibet.
1354	Fighting breaks out between the Sakyapa sect and the powerful Lang family which founds the Phagmodrupa dynasty.
1357	Birth of Je Tsongkhapa, founder of the Gelugpa sect.
1391	Birth of Gedun Truppa, disciple of Tsongkhapa and head of the Gelugpa sect, posthumously named as the First Dalai Lama.
1409	Establishment of Ganden Monastery.
1416	Establishment of Drepung Monastery.
1419	Establishment of Sera Monastery. Death of Tsongkhapa.
1434–1534	Power struggles between the provinces of Ü and Tsang because of the religious divide between the Gelugpa and Karmapa sects. Rise of the Rinpungpa dynasty.
1447	Establishment of Tashilhunpo Monastery in Gyantse.
1474	Death of the 1st Dalai Lama.
1475	Birth of the 2nd Dalai Lama, Gedun Gyatso.
1542	Death of the 2nd Dalai Lama.
1543	Birth of the 3rd Dalai Lama, Sonam Gyatso.
1565	Overthrown of the Rinpungpa dynasty by the Tsangpa dynasty.
1578	The Dalai Lama title was created by Altan Khan at Yanghua Monastery for Sonam Gyatso, the 3rd Dalai Lama.
1582	Establishment of Kumbum Monastery.
1587	The 3rd Dalai Lama was promoted to Duǒ Er Zhǐ Chàng (Chinese:朵儿只唱) by the Wanli Emperor, seal of authority and golden sheets were granted.
1588	Death of the 3rd Dalai Lama. Rebirth as the 4th Dalai Lama, Yonten Gyatso, great-grandson of Altan Khan and only non-Tibetan in the Dalai Lama lineage.
1616	Death of the 4th Dalai Lama.
1617	Birth of the great 5th Dalai Lama, Ngawang Lozang Gyatso. Under him, many construction projects begin across Tibet, including the Potala Palace. However, Ü Province falls to Tsang provincial forces and the power of the Karmapa sect grows.
1624–1636	Jesuit missionaries arrive in western Tibet.
1641–42	Güshi Khan of the Khoshut Mongols overthrows the King of Tsang and returns the territory to the Dalai Lama. Establishment of the Ganden Phodrang regime by the 5th Dalai Lama with his help. Beginning of Khosut Khanate rule over Tibet until 1717
1642–1659	Consolidation of the Tibetan theocracy. Power of the Karmapa sect is reduced once more, and many monasteries handed over to the Gelugpa sect. The Abbot of Tashilhunpo is bestowed the title Panchen Lama by the Dalai Lama.
1652	5th Dalai Lama visits Ming China.
1682	Death of the 5th Dalai Lama, kept a secret by the regent.
1683	Birth of the 6th Dalai Lama, Tsangyang Gyatso in Tawang.
1697	6th Dalai Lama enthroned and only now is the death of the 5th Dalai Lama made public.
1705	The last khan of the Khoshut Khanate, Lha-bzang Khan, invades Tibet and conquers Lhasa.
1706	The Khan deposes the 6th Dalai Lama and sends him to Ming China but he dies on the way. The Khan declares that the rebellious 6th Dalai Lama was not a true reincarnation and enthrones an eminent monk of his selection until the real one can be found.
1707	Italian Capuchin monks arrive in Tibet.
1708	Another reincarnation of the 6th Dalai Lama is found and he takes refuge in Kumbum Monastery.
1716	Jesuit Father Ippolito Desideri arrives in Lhasa.
1717–1720	Dzungar Mongols occupy Lhasa, killing Lha-bzang Khan. The Manchu Emperor of China deposes the 6th Dalai Lama and recognizes a claimant from Kumbum named Kelzang Gyatso, who is officially recognised as the 7th Dalai Lama in 1720. Beginning of Qing rule of Tibet.
1733–1747	Pholhanas (d. 1747) ends internal conflicts, and with Chinese support becomes ruler of Tibet.
1750	riots break out in Lhasa after the ambans assassination of the regent.
1751	The 7th Dalai Lama is recognised as ruler of Tibet, without effective political power.
1757	Death of the 7th Dalai Lama.
1758	Birth of the 8th Dalai Lama, Jompal Gyatso.
1774–75	First British Mission to Tibet let by George Bogle
1783–84	British Mission led by Samuel Turner. Chinese troops impose the Peace of Kathmandu following Gurkha incursions into Tibet.
1793	29-Article Ordinance for the More Effective Governing of Tibet (欽定藏內善後章程二十九條) was issued. Golden Urn was introduced.
1804	Death of the 8th Dalai Lama.
1806–1815	The 9th Dalai Lama.
1811-12	British explorer Thomas Manning reaches Lhasa.
1816–37	The 10th Dalai Lama, Tsultrim Gyatso.
1838–56	The 11th Dalai Lama, Khedrup Gyatso.
1841–42	Dogra–Tibetan War.
1842	Treaty of Chushul between Qing dynasty and Dogra dynasty
1846	Lazarist monks, Huc and Gabet, arrive in Lhasa.
1855–56	Nepalese–Tibetan War
1856–75	12th Dalai Lama, Trinley Gyatso.
1876	Birth of the 13th Dalai Lama, Thupten Gyatso. Diplomatic conflict between Britain and Russia over privileges in Tibet.
1890	British Protectorate over Sikkim.
1904	British military expedition under Francis Younghusband forces its way into Lhasa, forcing the Dalai Lama to flee to Mongolia. Agreement is made with the abbot of Ganden Monastery. Treaty of Lhasa signed.
1909	Dalai Lama returns safely to Lhasa.
1910	Restoration of Chinese control over eastern Tibet and dispatch of troops to Lhasa.
1911	Xinhai Lhasa turmoil following the Wuchang Uprising of October 1911 which led to the fall of the Qing dynasty.
1912	Dalai Lama returns to Lhasa from India, ruling without Chinese interference.
1913–14	Simla Convention between the British, Chinese and Tibetan delegates but the Chinese fail to ratify agreement.
1920-21	Mission of Sir Charles Alfred Bell to Tibet.
1923	Panchen Lama flees to China.
1933	Death of the 13th Dalai Lama.
1934	Appointment of Regent (abbot of Reting Monastery).
1935	Birth of the 14th Dalai Lama, Tenzin Gyatso.
1940	On 26 January 1940, the Regent Reting Rinpoche requested the Central Government to exempt Lhamo Dhondup from lot-drawing process using Golden Urn to become the 14th Dalai Lama. The request was approved by the Central Government. Enthronement of the 14th Dalai Lama.
1944	Arrival of Austrians Heinrich Harrer and Peter Aufschnaiter in Tibet. They reach Lhasa in January 1946.
1947	Indian independence and end of the British Tibet Policy.
1950	6 to 19 October Battle of Chamdo.
1951	Arrival of the People's Liberation Army in Lhasa following an agreement for liberation with the Central People's Government.
1954	Dalai Lama attended the National People's Congress in Beijing as a deputy and met Mao Zedong. Establishment of the North-East Frontier Agency in South Tibet, occupied by India.
1959	After a revolt against acceded reform, the 14th Dalai Lama fled Tibet with the help of CIA, later set up an exile government in India.
1960–62	Famine, caused by Great Leap Forward and termination of cross-Himalayan trade with India.
1962	Sino-Indian War.
1964	Establishment of the Tibet Autonomous Region.
2011	The 14th Dalai Lama bequeathed his political power as the head of state and temporal leader of Tibet to the democratically elected prime minister Dr. Lobsang Sangay, marking the end of the Ganden Phodrang theocratic rule to Tibet which lasted for 370 years (1642–2011).

== See also ==
- Timeline of the Tibetan Empire (7th to 9th century)
- Timeline of the Era of Fragmentation (9th to 13th century)
