= List of Dalai Lamas =

Dalai Lama as temporal ruler of Tibet
- Emblem of the Tibetan government-in-exile

- Flag of the Tibetan government-in-exile

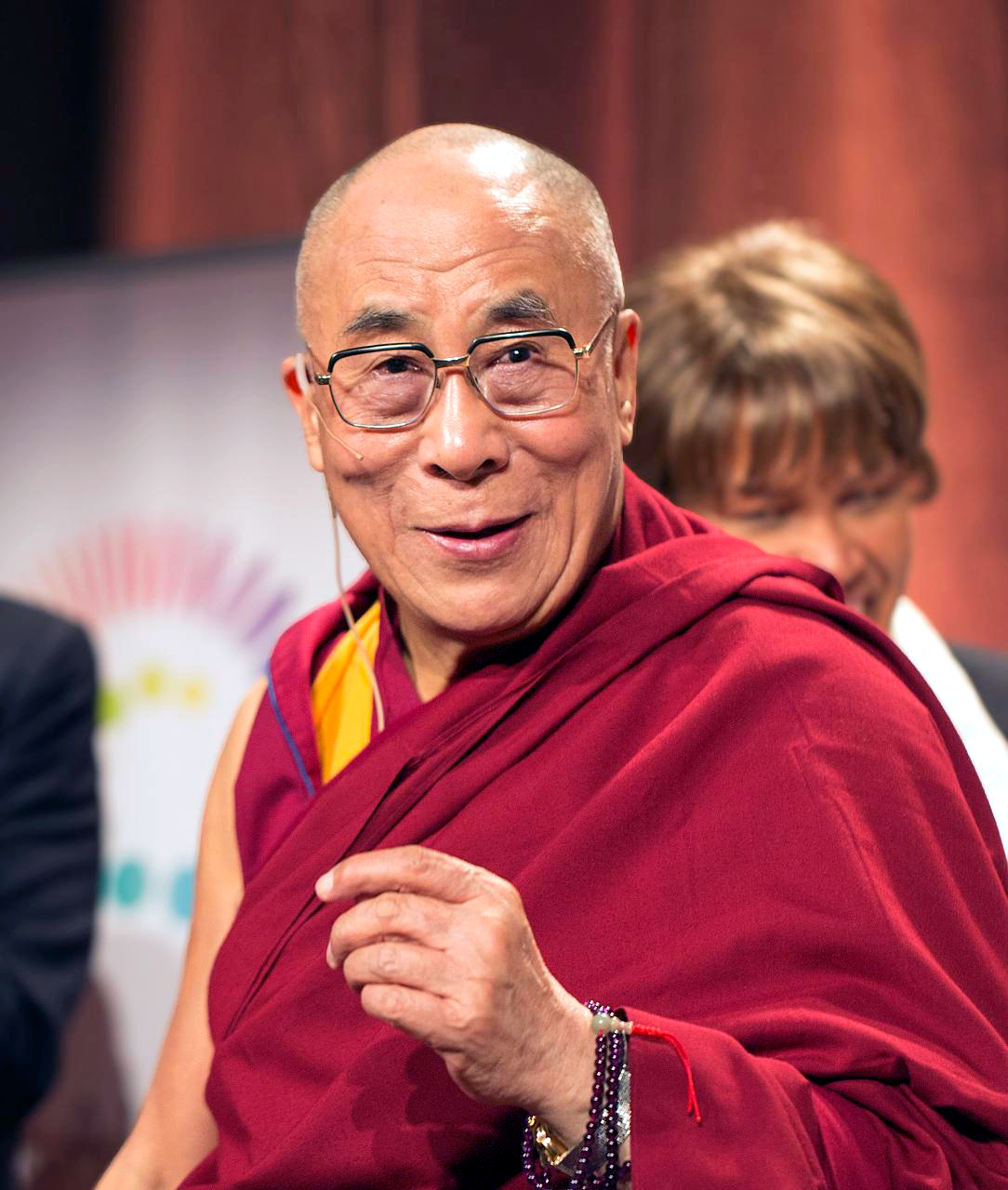
- 14th Dalai Lama
- Style: His Holiness
- Residence: Potala Palace; Norbulingka
- Seat: Lhasa
- Term length: Life tenure
- Formation: 1642
- First holder: 5th Dalai Lama
- Final holder: 14th Dalai Lama
- Abolished: 23 May 1951 (Seventeen Point Agreement)

This is a list of Dalai Lamas of Tibet. There have been 14 recognised incarnations of the Dalai Lama.

There has also been one non-recognised Dalai Lama, Ngawang Yeshe Gyatso (declared in 1707), by Lha-bzang Khan as the "true" 6th Dalai Lama – however, he was never accepted as such by the majority of the Tibetan people.

== List ==
| Title | Portrait | Name (Lifespan) | Tibetan Wylie transliteration | Dalai Lama from | Dalai Lama until |
|---|---|---|---|---|---|
| 1st Dalai Lama | | Gedun Drupa (1391–1474) | དགེ་འདུན་གྲུབ་པ། dge 'dun grub pa | N/A | 1474 |
| 2nd Dalai Lama | | Gedun Gyatso (1475–1542) | དགེ་འདུན་རྒྱ་མཚོ། dge-'dun rgya-mtsho | N/A | 1542 |
| 3rd Dalai Lama | | Sonam Gyatso (1543–1588) | བསོད་ནམས་རྒྱ་མཚོ་ bsod nams rgya mtsho | 1578 | 1588 |
| 4th Dalai Lama | | Yonten Gyatso (1589–1617) | ཡོན་ཏན་རྒྱ་མཚོ་ yon tan rgya mtsho | 1601 | 1617 |
| 5th Dalai Lama | | Ngawang Lobsang Gyatso (1617–1682) | ངག་དབང་བློ་བཟང་རྒྱ་མཚོ་ Ngag-dbang blo-bzang rgya-mtsho | 1642 | 1682 |
| 6th Dalai Lama | | Tsangyang Gyatso (1683–1706) | ཚངས་དབྱངས་རྒྱ་མཚོ tshangs-dbyangs rgya-mtsho | 1697 | 1706 |
| 7th Dalai Lama | | Kelzang Gyatso (1708–1757) | བསྐལ་བཟང་རྒྱ་མཚོ་ bskal bzang rgya mtsho | 1720 | 1757 |
| 8th Dalai Lama | | Jamphel Gyatso (1758–1804) | འཇམ་དཔལ་རྒྱ་མཚོ 'jam dpal rgya mtsho | 1762 | 1804 |
| 9th Dalai Lama | | Lungtok Gyatso (1805–1815) | ལུང་རྟོགས་རྒྱ་མཚོ་ lung rtogs rgya mtsho | 1810 | 6 March 1815 |
| 10th Dalai Lama | | Tsultrim Gyatso (1816–1837) | ཚུལ་ཁྲིམས་རྒྱ་མཚོ་ tshul khrim rgya mtsho | 1826 | 30 September 1837 |
| 11th Dalai Lama | | Khedrup Gyatso (1838–1856) | མཁས་གྲུབ་རྒྱ་མཚོ་ mkhas grub rgya mtsho | 1842 | 31 January 1856 |
| 12th Dalai Lama | | Trinley Gyatso (1857–1875) | འཕྲིན་ལས་རྒྱ་མཚོ། 'phrin las rgya mtsho | 1860 | 25 April 1875 |
| 13th Dalai Lama | | Thubten Gyatso (1876–1933) | ཐུབ་བསྟན་རྒྱ་མཚོ་ thub bstan rgya mtsho | 31 July 1879 | 17 December 1933 |
| 14th Dalai Lama | | Tenzin Gyatso (born 1935) | བསྟན་འཛིན་རྒྱ་མཚོ་ bstan 'dzin rgya mtsho | 22 February 1940 (de jure) | Incumbent |
| 14th Dalai Lama | | Tenzin Gyatso (born 1935) | བསྟན་འཛིན་རྒྱ་མཚོ་ bstan 'dzin rgya mtsho | 17 November 1950 (de facto) | Incumbent |

== See also ==
- List of Panchen Lamas
- List of rulers of Tibet

== Bibliography ==
- Stein, R. A. (1972). Tibetan civilization ([English ed.]. ed.). Stanford, Calif.: Stanford Univ. Press. ISBN 0-8047-0901-7.
- Mullin, Glenn H. (2001). The Fourteen Dalai Lamas: A Sacred Legacy of Reincarnation. Clear Light Publishers. Santa Fe, NM. ISBN 1-57416-092-3.
