= Succession of the 14th Dalai Lama =

Geo-political dispute about religious procedure

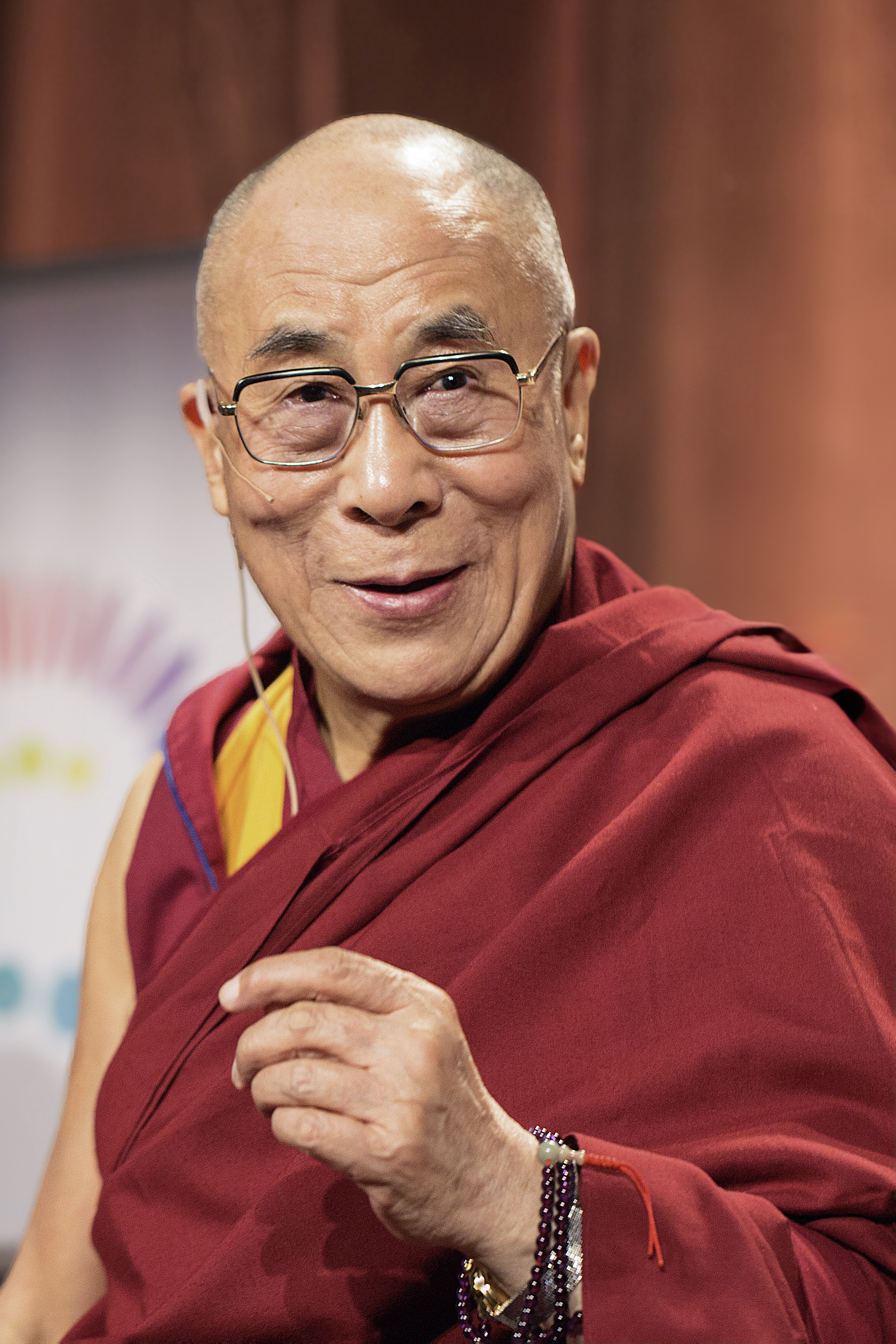
14th Dalai Lama in 2012

The Dalai Lama title was created by Altan Khan in 1587. According to Tibetan Buddhism, the Dalai Lama is believed by adherents to be able to choose the body into which he is reincarnated. That person, when found, will then become the next Dalai Lama.

In the past, the 14th Dalai Lama has said that he could reincarnate as a person from outside of Tibet, as a "mischievous blonde woman" or not reincarnate at all. In 2025, he said that the institution of Dalai Lama will continue and be recognized exclusively by the Gaden Phodrang. Chinese officials have accused him of "flip-flopping" on the issue, while critics have accused the Chinese government of interfering in religious affairs. The Chinese government has stated that Tibetan affairs are China's internal affairs that brook no external interference.

== Background ==
According to Tibetan Buddhism, if a high lama about to pass away sees benefit in being reborn to continue his work, he reincarnates accordingly. After the lama's death, a child is sought, and the candidate who passes a series of tests is recognized as the tulku, or reincarnation, of the deceased lama. The process of recognition begins with consulting another high lama or oracle for indications, such as the blossoming of trees, earth tremors, the direction of smoke from cremation, omens or dreams experienced by the parents, all of which must be confirmed. More tests include checking a child's personality and whether they remember anything about the previous lama, his possessions, and close associates. Additional inner and secret tests using meditative insight are conducted. The final decision, based on all findings, is made by an authoritative lama.

The tradition of formally recognizing reincarnate lamas began with Karma Pakshi, the second Karmapa. In the Gelug school, the tradition began with the second Dalai Lama, Gedun Gyatso. If a single candidate is identified, the high lamas report their findings to eminent individuals and then to the Government. If more than one candidate is identified, the true successor is found by officials and monks drawing lots in a public ceremony. Once identified, the successful candidate and his family are taken to Lhasa where the child will study the Buddhist scriptures in order to prepare for spiritual leadership. Since the 1790s, confirmation through or exemption from the Golden Urn process has been required for multiple Dalai Lamas and Panchen Lamas.

== According to the 14th Dalai Lama ==
In a 2004 interview with Time, the 14th Dalai Lama stated:

The institution of the Dalai Lama, and whether it should continue or not, is up to the Tibetan people. If they feel it is not relevant, then it will cease and there will be no 15th Dalai Lama. But if I die today I think they will want another Dalai Lama. The purpose of reincarnation is to fulfill the previous [incarnation's] life task. My life is outside Tibet, therefore my reincarnation will logically be found outside. But then, the next question: Will the Chinese accept this or not? China will not accept. The Chinese government most probably will appoint another Dalai Lama, like it did with the Panchen Lama. Then there will be two Dalai Lamas: one, the Dalai Lama of the Tibetan heart, and one that is officially appointed.

The Dalai Lama stated in 2007 that the next Dalai Lama could possibly be a woman, remarking, "If a woman reveals herself as more useful the lama could very well be reincarnated in this form". On 24 September 2011, the Dalai Lama issued a statement concerning his reincarnation giving exact signs on how the next one should be chosen, the place of rebirth and that the Chinese appointed Dalai Lama should not be trusted.

In 2015, the 14th Dalai Lama claimed (presumably as a joke) he may be reincarnated as a mischievous blonde woman. In 2019, the 14th Dalai Lama said that if a female Dalai Lama comes, she should be more attractive.

In October 2019, the 14th Dalai Lama stated that because of the feudal origin of the Dalai Lama reincarnation system, the reincarnation system should end. In his book Voice for the Voiceless, the Dalai Lama states that his reincarnation will be born outside of China. He writes, "Since the purpose of a reincarnation is to carry on the work of the predecessor, the new Dalai Lama will be born in the free world so that the traditional mission of the Dalai Lama - that is, to be the voice for universal compassion, the spiritual leader of Tibetan Buddhism, and the symbol of Tibet embodying the aspirations of the Tibetan people - will continue."

Responding to pronouncements of Chinese government officials insisting that they had the responsibility to choose the next Dalai Lama, Lobsang Sangay, Sikyong (prime minister) of the Tibetan government-in-exile, countered "It's like Fidel Castro saying, 'I will select the next Pope and all the Catholics should follow.'"

On 2 July 2025, shortly before his 90th birthday, the Dalai Lama released a statement saying, "I am affirming that the institution of the Dalai Lama will continue." He further stated that members of the Gaden Phodrang Trust would have exclusive responsibility for recognizing the next Dalai Lama and that "no one else has any such authority to interfere in this matter."

== According to the Chinese government ==
The government of China has adopted a process for selecting the Tibetan Buddhist Dalai Lamas based on the Qing dynasty's imperial rules and the customary right of Chinese emperors to approve Buddhist reincarnations. The government involvement in the selection process remains controversial.

In 2004 the Religious Affairs Regulations (Chinese: 宗教事务条例) was published by the Central Government of the People's Republic of China after the Method of Reincarnation of Lamas (Chinese: 喇嘛轉世辦法) was abolished. Article 36 of the Religious Affairs Regulations states that the reincarnation system must follow religious rituals and historical customs, and be approved by the government.

The Golden Urn selection method that was established during the Qing dynasty became institutionalized in the 2007 State Religious Affairs Bureau Order No. 5 (Chinese: 国家宗教事务局令第5号) of the Central Government. Article 7 states that no group or individual may carry out activities related to searching for and identifying the reincarnated soul boy of the 'living Buddha' without authorization. Article 8 states that lot-drawing ceremony with Golden Urn is applicable to those rinpoches, or lamas who were reincarnated previously in history. Request of exemption is handled by State Administration for Religious Affairs, for those with great impact, request of exemption is handled by State Council.

In 2015, the Chairman of the Standing Committee of the People's Congress of Tibet, Padma Choling (白玛赤林), accused the Dalai Lama of profaning religion and hypocrisy for expressing the idea that reincarnation was not obligatory. Padma also objected to the Dalai Lama's insistence that no government had the right to choose the next Dalai Lama for political purposes. Padma argued instead that the Chinese government in Beijing had the right to decide.

The Chinese Communist Party (CCP) is officially atheist although it tolerates religion among members of the public. It is not easy to become a 'living Buddha' in China. After years of meditation and discipline comes the bureaucracy. The CCP is uncomfortable with forces beyond its control and has for years attempted to regulate the religious affairs of Tibetan Buddhists, including their reincarnations.

In October 2019, Chinese Foreign Ministry speaker Geng Shuang stated:

The institution of reincarnation of the Dalai Lama has been in existence for several hundred years. The 14th (present) Dalai Lama himself was found and recognised following rituals and conventions, and his succession was approved by the then central government. Therefore, the reincarnation must comply with Chinese laws and regulations, follow rituals and historic conventions.

=== History of the Golden Urn process ===
In 1792 the Qianlong Emperor of the Qing dynasty published The Discourse of Lama, in which he questioned the reincarnation of Buddhas because they are not supposed to have births or deaths according to fundamental teachings of Buddhism. On the other hand, without reincarnated tulkus, many Tibetan Buddhists would lose their spiritual support. Qianlong explained that choosing reincarnated lamas with the Golden Urn, as opposed to private designation or one person's choice, would be more fair and could also prevent greedy families from acquiring multiple religious positions such as reincarnated rinpoches or lamas. The first article of 29-Article Ordinance for the More Effective Governing of Tibet states that the purpose of Golden Urn is to ensure the prosperity of Gelug and to eliminate cheating and corruption in the selection process.

Since the creation of the Golden Urn, its confirmation or exemption has been required for multiple Dalai Lamas and Panchen Lamas. In 1814 the registration process for all 167 Tulkus in Tibet, Kham, and Inner Mongolia was completed.

According to Chinese reports, on 26 January 1940, the Reting Rinpoche requested the Central Government to exempt Lhamo Dhondup from the Golden Urn lot-drawing process. Tibetologist Melvyn Goldstein wrote that while the Chinese envoy enjoyed additional privileges during the 14th Dalai Lama's enthronement, it is implausible for the Tibetan leadership to seek permission from the Chinese government. The request was approved by the Central Government of Republic of China in 1940, and Lhamo Dhondup went on to become the 14th Dalai Lama.

== Opinions ==
According to Laxianjia, deputy director of Chinese government affiliated China Tibetology Research Center, irrespective of the Dalai Lama's exile outside of China, his reincarnation "is still part of the Gelug tradition and under the jurisdiction of the Chinese government, as most temples are located within China". In 2025, Li Decheng, the deputy director general of the China Tibetology Research Center, said that Drepung Monastery in Lhasa has the capacity to look for the 15th Dalai Lama, and that it is "illegal" for the Dalai Lama to be "declared to have been reincarnated abroad."

Some analysts opine that even if China uses the Golden Urn to pick a future Dalai Lama, they would lack the legitimacy and popular support needed to be functional, as Tibetan Buddhists all over the world would not recognize them. According to Tibetan scholar Robert Barnett, China has failed in Tibet, also failed to find consistent leadership in Tibet by any Tibetan lama who is really respected by Tibetan people, and who at the same time endorses Communist Party rule."

Despite the tradition of selecting young children, the 14th Dalai Lama may name an adult as his successor. Doing so would have the advantage that the successor would not need to spend decades studying Buddhism and could be taken seriously as a leader by the Tibetan diaspora immediately.

The selection process for the next Dalai Lama has drawn interest and involvement from various nations, including Mongolia, which maintains strong ties to Tibetan Buddhism.

Given that Tibetan Government in Exile and the Dalai Lama are based in India today and that the Dalai Lama has stated he will likely be reborn outside of Tibet/China, the prospect of the next Dalai Lama being born in India raises questions about what impact that would have on India-China relations. Kiren Rijiju, the Minister of Minority Affairs of India, affirmed that the Dalai Lama holds a central and defining role within global Buddhism. He asserted that any decision concerning the succession of the Dalai Lama should be guided by the preferences and decisions of the Dalai Lama himself, rather than external influence.

A political challenge to Chinese control of Tibet from an Indian-born leader has implications for both sides. Alternatively, a CCP-appointed leader who gains power within the India-based government in exile also has significant ramifications.

On 25 March 2026, the Czech Senate passed a resolution with strong support, emphasizing the protection of religious freedom for the Tibetan people and their exclusive right to choose their spiritual leader, the Dalai Lama. The resolution asserted that China has no legitimate authority in selecting the successor to 14th Dalai Lama and affirms that the choice of the 15th Dalai Lama is solely the responsibility of the Tibetan people.

== See also ==
- History of Tibet
- Tibet Autonomous Region
- Tibet Policy and Support Act
- Sinicization of Tibet

== Sources ==
- Goldstein, Melvyn C. (18 June 1991). A History of Modern Tibet, 1913–1951: The Demise of the Lamaist State. University of California Press. ISBN 978-0-520-91176-5.
