= Sitting-in-the-bed =

Tibetan Buddhist ceremony

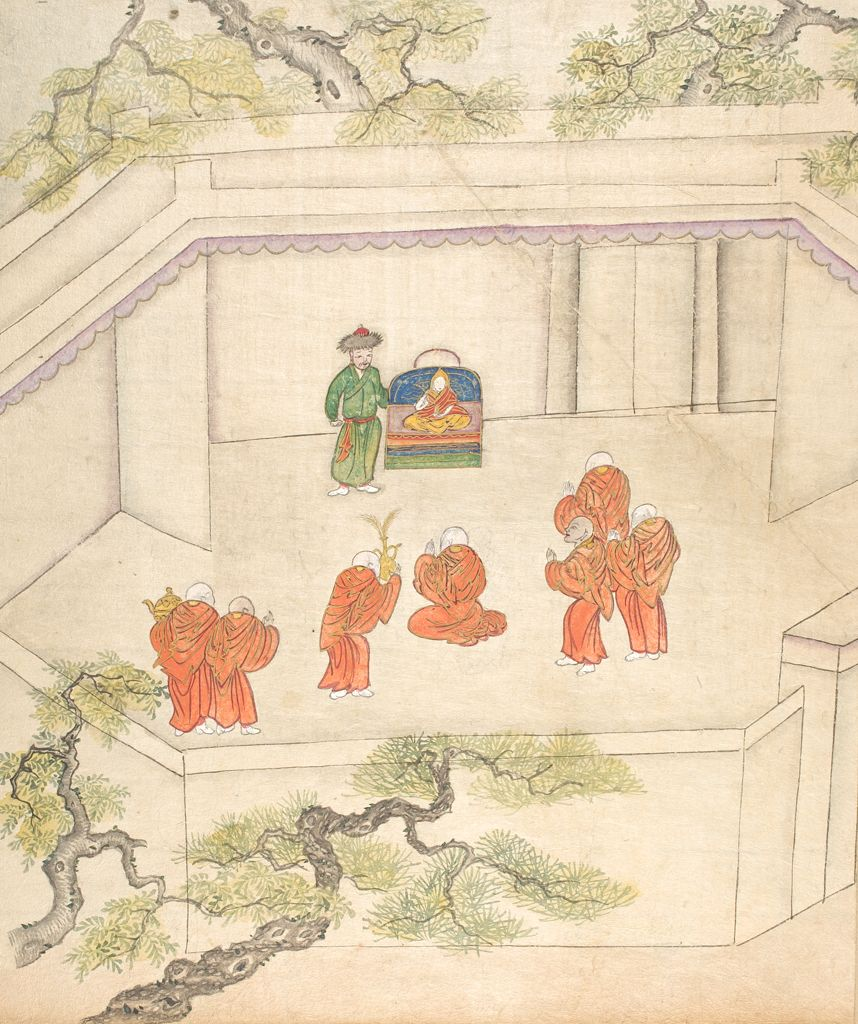
Sitting-in-the-bed of the 9th Dalai Lama

Sitting-in-the-bed (Tibetan: ཁྲི་ལ་བཞུགས khri la bzhugs Chinese: 坐床, zuo chuang) is a major religious ceremony in Tibetan Buddhist temples. It is a necessary ceremony for the reincarnated person to formally succeed the living Buddha by the reincarnated soul boy and change the name during the inheritance process of the living Buddha.

In Buddhist texts, the terms "bed" (床) and "throne" (座) are often used interchangeably. For example, the phrase "the body is a bed and a seat, pervading the universe" (身為床座徧大千) of the Buddhāvataṃsaka Sūtra implies the Buddha's great aspiration and profound virtue, capable of saving all sentient beings through his own efforts. Similarly, the sitting-in-the-bed ceremony (坐床大典) of the Dalai Lama and Panchen Lama in Tibet is actually the enthronement ceremony, and the so-called "golden bed" is just the "precious throne".

The main content of sitting on the bed is to respect the ancestors of Tibetan Buddhism sects, and Songtsen Gampo, Princess Wencheng, Padmasambhava, and the goddess Bailangmu.

For important lamas including the Dalai Lamas and Panchen Lamas, sitting-in-the-bed ceremony happens after Golden Urn ceremony and approval from the Central Government. Sitting-in-the-bed ceremony for the 10th Dalai Lama was held in the Potala Palace. Sitting-in-the-bed ceremony for the 13th Dalai Lama was held in the Potala Palace.

== See also ==
- Golden Urn
