= Golden Urn =

Method for selecting Tibetan reincarnations

Chinese name
- Traditional Chinese: 金瓶掣籤
- Simplified Chinese: 金瓶掣签
- Literal meaning: Drawing Lots from the Golden Vase
Transcriptions
Standard Mandarin
- Hanyu Pinyin: Jīnpíng Chèqiān
- IPA: [tɕínpʰǐŋ ʈʂʰɤ̂tɕʰjɛ́n]

Tibetan name
- Tibetan: གསེར་བུམ་སྐྲུག་པ
Transcriptions
- Wylie: gser bum skrug pa

The Golden Urn is a method introduced by the Qing dynasty of China in 1793 for selecting Tibetan reincarnations by drawing lots or tally sticks from a golden urn. After the Sino-Nepalese War, the Qianlong Emperor promulgated the 29-Article Ordinance for the More Effective Governing of Tibet, which included regulations on selecting lamas. The Golden Urn was ostensibly introduced to prevent cheating and corruption in the process but it also positioned the Qianlong Emperor as a religious authority capable of adducing incarnation candidates. A number of lamas, such as the 8th and 9th Panchen Lamas and the 10th Dalai Lama, were confirmed using the Golden Urn. In cases where the Golden Urn was not used, the amban was consulted. Lhamo Dhondup was exempted from the Golden Urn to become the 14th Dalai Lama in 1940.

== History ==
=== Qing dynasty ===
The Golden Urn originated in a 1792 decree by the Qianlong Emperor, after the Qing victory in the Second Invasion of the Sino-Nepalese War. Article One of the decree, the 29-Article Ordinance for the More Effective Governing of Tibet, was designed to be used in selecting rinpoches, lamas, and other high offices in Tibetan Buddhism, including the Dalai Lamas, Panchen Lamas, and Mongolian lamas. In Qianlong Emperor's article The Discourse of Lama (Chinese: 喇嘛说), also published in 1792, he explained the history of lamas and the reincarnation system, argued that the reincarnation system is man-made, and created rules to eliminate the system's drawbacks.

The 29-Article Ordinance for the More Effective Governing of Tibet allows the Qing emperors of China to control the selection process to prevent Mongol and Tibetan nobles from taking advantage of it to seize religious power and to prevent lamas from combining with secular forces.

The Qianlong Emperor issued two Golden Urns. One is enshrined in Jokhang Temple in Lhasa and is to be used for choosing Dalai and Panchen Lama reincarnations; the other is in Yonghe Temple in Beijing for choosing Mongolian Lama, known as Jebtsundamba Khutughtu, reincarnations.

The specific ritual to be followed when using the Golden Urn was written by the 8th Dalai Lama, Jamphel Gyatso. The names and dates of birth of each candidate were to be written in the Manchu, Han, and Tibetan languages on metal or ivory slips and placed in the urn. After prayers before the statue of the Jowo in the Jokhang temple in Lhasa, a slip was drawn. The 7th Panchen Lama, Palden Tenpai Nyima, used the Golden Urn for the first time in 1822 to choose the 10th Dalai Lama, Tsultrim Gyatso.

=== Republic of China ===
On 12 August 1927, the Central Government mandated that before the publication of new laws, all laws regarding Tibetan Buddhism should continue unless they conflicted with new doctrine or new laws of the Central Government.

In August 1929, the Supreme Court of the Central Government ruled that before the publication of new laws, preexisting laws about Tibet and the reincarnation of rinpoches or lamas applied.

In 1935, the Central Government of China published the Ordinance of Lama Temple Management (Chinese: 管理喇嘛寺廟條例). Article 2 states that reincarnated lamas are limited to those who were reincarnated previously, unless approved by the Central Government. Article 5 states that all monasteries, temples, and lamas must register with the Mongolian and Tibetan Affairs Commission. Article 7 states that the Mongolian and Tibetan Affairs Commission shall draft the methods of lamas' reincarnation, appointment, rewards and punishments, registration, etc., and submit them to the Executive Yuan for approval.

In 1936, based on articles 2 and 7 of the Ordinance of Lama Temple Management (Chinese: 管理喇嘛寺廟條例), the Mongolian and Tibetan Affairs Commission published the Method of Reincarnation of Lamas (Chinese: 喇嘛轉世辦法).

Article 3 states that the death of lamas including the Dalai Lama and the Panchen Lama should be reported to Mongolian and Tibetan Affairs Commission, soul boys should be found, reported to and checked by Mongolian and Tibetan Affairs Commission, and a lot-drawing ceremony with the Golden Urn system should be held. Article 6 states that local governments should invite Central Government officials to take care of the sitting-in-the-bed ceremony. Article 7 states that soul boys should not be searched for from current lama families.

=== People's Republic of China ===
The traditional method of identifying the reincarnation of Lamas (Chinese: 喇嘛轉世辦法) was abolished in 2004. In 2004, the Central Government published the Religious Affairs Regulations (Chinese: 宗教事务条例). Article 36 states that the reincarnation system must follow religious rituals and historical customs and be approved by the government.

In 2007, the Central Government published the State Religious Affairs Bureau Order No. 5 (Chinese: 国家宗教事务局令第5号). Article 7 states that no group or individual may carry out activities related to searching for and identifying the reincarnated soul boy of the Living Buddha without authorization.

Article 8 states that a lot-drawing ceremony with the Golden Urn is applicable to rinpoches or lamas reincarnated previously in history. The State Administration for Religious Affairs handles requests for exemption, and the State Council handles requests for exemptions that would have significant impact.

== Usage ==
=== Dalai Lamas born after 1792 ===
	Name	Date of sitting-in-the-bed ceremony	Golden Urn Used?	Approval process from the Central Government
9	Lungtok Gyatso	10 November 1808	No	Exemption from using Golden Urn was approved by the Emperor.
10	Tsultrim Gyatso	8 August 1822	Yes	Lot-drawing result was reported and approved by emperor.
11	Khendrup Gyatso	16 April 1842	Yes	Request to proceed with the lot-drawing ceremony was approved in December 1840.
12	Trinley Gyatso	3 July 1860	Yes	Lot-drawing ceremony was approved by the Emperor
13	Thubten Gyatso	14 June 1879	No	In 1877, request to exempt the 13th Dalai Lama from using lot-drawing process was approved by the Central Government of China.
14	Tenzin Gyatso	22 February 1940	No	On 26 January 1940, the Regent Reting Rinpoche requested the Central Government of Republic of China to exempt Lhamo Dhondup from lot-drawing process using Golden Urn to become the 14th Dalai Lama. The request was approved by the National Government of the Republic of China.

=== Panchen Lamas born after 1792 ===
	Name	Date of sitting-in-the-bed ceremony	Golden Urn Used?	Approval process from the Central Government
8	Tenpai Wangchuk	15 November 1860	Yes	Lot-drawing result was reported and approved by Xianfeng Emperor in October 1860.
9	Thupten Chokyi Nyima	1 February 1892	Yes	Lot-drawing process was approved by Guangxu Emperor on 25 February 1888.
10	Choekyi Gyaltsen	10 August 1949	No	Exemption of using lot-drawing process was approved on 3 June 1949 by the Central Government.
11*	Gyaincain Norbu	8 December 1995	Yes	Lot-drawing ceremony was held on 29 November 1995, and Gyaincain Norbu was approved by the Central Government on 8 December 1995 to become the 11th Panchen Lama.

- Late in the evening of May 13, 1995, officials from relevant departments in Beijing and Tibet received a surprise phone call from the Dalai Lama's permanent representative in Hong Kong, Gyalo Thondup (the Dalai Lama's second brother), informing them that the Dalai Lama would formally announce the reincarnation of the 10th Panchen Lama the following day. On May 14, 1995, the Dalai Lama announced in Delhi Tibetan radio from India that Gedhun Choekyi Nyima, born in Gyali County, Tibet, was the reincarnation of the 10th Panchen Lama. At that time, the selection process for the candidate was still underway; the golden urn drawing ceremony had not yet taken place, and the Chinese central government had not yet announced any information regarding the reincarnation. The Dalai Lama's preemptive announcement sparked strong dissatisfaction among the Chinese central government, and Chadrel Rinpoche was secretly arrested that same month. On June 14, 1996, the 17th meeting of the Standing Committee of the Eighth National Committee of the CPPCC revoked Chadrel Rinpoche's membership in the CPPCC and its Standing Committee. In 1997, he was sentenced to six years in prison and deprived of political rights for three years by the Shigatse Intermediate People's Court in the Tibet Autonomous Region on charges of splitting the country and intentionally leaking state secrets.

=== Changkya Khutukhtu born after 1642 ===
	Name	Date of sitting-in-the-bed ceremony	Golden Urn Used?	Approval process from the Central Government
4	Yéshé Tenpé Gyeltsen		Yes	Approved by Central Government of China.
5	Changkya Yéshé Tenpé Nyima		Yes	Approved by Central Government of China.
6	Lozang Tendzin Gyeltsen		Yes	Approved by Central Government of China.
7	Lozang Penden Tenpé Drönmé		Yes	Approved by Central Government of China.
8	Tendzin Dönyö Yéshé Gyatso		No	Designated by the Dalai Lama, not approved by Central Government of China.

- After the retrocession of Taiwan, Lozang Penden Tenpé Drönmé arrived in Taiwan as the government moved to Taiwan. It has been reported that before his death in 1957 he had signed a pledge that he would not reincarnate until the Republic of China retook the mainland. However, the Dalai Lama recognised the current incarnation, Tendzin Dönyö Yéshé Gyatso, on 11 August 1998. He was born in 1980 in Tsongkha, was ordained at an early age and came to India as a refugee in 1998. He is now residing in the re-established Drepung Monastery, in India. Neither he nor two other claimants to be the current Changkya are recognised by either Taipei or Beijing.

=== Jebtsundamba Khutuktu born after 1792 ===
	Name	Date of sitting-in-the-bed ceremony	Golden Urn Used?	Approval process from the Central Government
5	Luvsanchültimjigmed		Yes	Approved by Central Government of China.
6	Luvsantüvdenchoyjijaltsan		Yes	Approved by Central Government of China.
7	Agvaanchoyjivanchugperenlaijamts		Yes	Approved by Central Government of China.
8	Bogd Khan		Yes	Approved by Central Government of China.

== See also ==
- 13-Article Ordinance for the More Effective Governing of Tibet
- Caesaropapism
