= Palden Tenpai Nyima, 7th Panchen Lama =

Palden Tenpai Nyima

Tibetan: གྤལ་ལྡན་བསྟན་པའི་ཉི་མ་
Wylie: Dpal-ldan Bstan-pa'i Nyi-ma
ZWPY: Baidan Dainbai Nyima

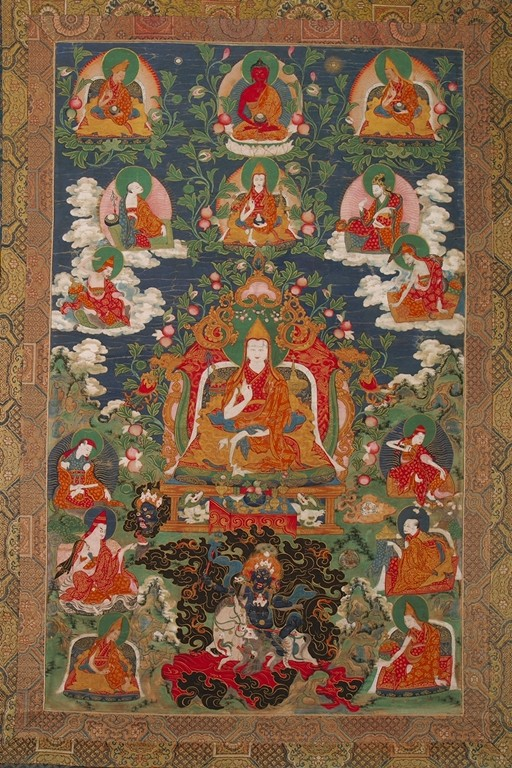
Palden Tenpai Nyima

Palden Tenpai Nyima (1782–1853) was the 7th Panchen Lama of Tibet.

== Early life and reign ==
Lobsang Palden Yeshe, the previous Panchen Lama, died from smallpox in Beijing in 1780. His brother Shamarpa, who was acting as regent, wrote to the British Governor of India, Warren Hastings, in 1782 to say that a new incarnation had been found.

Shamarpa had hoped to inherit some of the riches given to his brother in Beijing after his death. When this didn't happen, he conspired with the Nepalese, who sent a Gurkha army in 1788 and took control of Shigatse. Shamarpa, however, did not keep his side of the bargain and the Gurkha army returned three years later to claim their spoils, but a Chinese army drove them back to Nepal in 1792.

== The 7th Panchen Lama and successive Dalai Lamas ==
The 7th Panchen Lama's life coincided with the "period of the short-lived Dalai Lamas". This made the Panchen Lama "the lama of the hour, filling the void left by the four Dalai Lamas who died in their youth."

The first of these short-lived Dalai Lamas was the 9th Dalai Lama, found in 1807 after the death of the 8th Dalai Lama in 1804. In 1810 (or 1811) the 7th Panchen Lama gave the pre-novice ordination to the 9th Dalai Lama at Potala Palace, and gave him the name Lungtok Gyatso.

After the 9th Dalai Lama died in 1815, eight years passed before a new Dalai Lama was chosen. The political events in this period are murky, but finally the 7th Panchen Lama intervened and used the Golden Urn (from which names of candidates were picked) for the first time as part of the tests for the choice of the new Dalai Lama. In 1822 the 10th Dalai Lama was placed upon the Golden Throne and soon after his enthronement received his pre-novice ordination and the name Tsultrim Gyatso from the 7th Panchen Lama. In 1831, Tsultrin Gyatso received full ordination from Palden Tenpai Nyima. The 10th Dalai Lama died in 1837.

In 1841, the 7th Panchen Lama recognised the 11th Dalai Lama, administered the pre-novice vows and named him Khedrup Gyatso.

In 1844, the 7th Panchen Lama had a summer palace built about 1 km south of Tashilhunpo Monastery containing 2 chapels in walled gardens. The 10th Panchen Lama added sumptuous sitting rooms and audience room. It is now a popular picnic spot described in a tourist guide.

In 1844 the 11th Dalai Lama left to travel to Eastern Tibet. Monks from Sera Monastery kidnapped three secretaries from the Regent's government to guarantee his welfare, which resulted in a national emergency. The 7th Panchen Lama was invited to return to Lhasa from Tsang Province and, in the 8th month of that year, was placed on the throne as the new regent. However, he only accepted that role for a short period, handing over the regency to Rva-dreng Nga-wang Ye-she Tsul-trim in 1845. In 1846 the 7th Panchen Lama administered the full novice ordination on the 11th Dalai Lama.

== Death and legacy ==
The 7th Panchen Lama died in 1853. According to R. A. Stein, he "enjoyed great prestige at the Chinese court."

All the tombs from the 5th to the 9th Panchen Lamas were destroyed during the Cultural Revolution and have been rebuilt by the 10th Panchen Lama with a huge tomb at Tashilhunpo Monastery in Shigatse, known as the Tashi Langyar.

== Footnotes ==
Preceded by Lobsang Palden Yeshe	Panchen Lama	Succeeded by Tenpai Wangchuk
