= State Religious Affairs Bureau Order No. 5 =

Chinese regulation

State Religious Affairs Bureau Order No. 5 (simplified Chinese: 国家宗教事务局令第5号; traditional Chinese: 國家宗教事務局令第5號), officially named Measures on the Management of the Reincarnation of Living Buddhas in Tibetan Buddhism (simplified Chinese: 藏传佛教活佛转世管理办法; traditional Chinese: 藏傳佛教活佛轉世管理辦法), is an order passed during a conference of the State Administration for Religious Affairs on 13 July 2007, marked for implementation on 1 September 2007.

Order No. 5 states that a Reincarnation Application must be filed by all Buddhist temples in that country before they are allowed to recognize individuals as tulkus (reincarnated teachers).

Tibetan Buddhists maintain that lamas and other spiritual leaders can consciously influence their rebirths, and often are reborn many times to continue their spiritual pursuits. These tulkus are referred to in sources translated from Chinese as living Buddhas.

The order is based on the prior decree entitled Notice of the Central Committee of the Chinese Communist Party and the State Council on Improving Several Issues Concerning Religious Work (Chinese: 中共中央、国务院关于进一步做好宗教工作若干问题的通知) published in 1991, which emphasizes the party's control over religious issues.

== Order No. Five regulations ==
The Articles of the State Religious Affairs Bureau Order No. 5 are as follows, sourced from International Campaign for Tibet and from Chinese media sources:

These "Management measures for the reincarnation of living Buddhas in Tibetan Buddhism" were passed at the administrative affairs conference of the State Administration of Religious Affairs on July 13, 2007, and will be implemented on September 1, 2007.

Bureau Director, Ye Xiaowen July 18, 2007

- Article 1: These measures have been formulated in accordance with the "Regulations on Religious Affairs" in order to guarantee citizens' freedom of religious belief, to respect Tibetan Buddhism's practice of inheriting living Buddha positions, and to regulate the management of living Buddha reincarnation affairs.
- Article 2: Reincarnating living Buddhas should respect and protect the principles of the unification of the state, protecting the unity of the minorities, protecting religious concord and social harmony, and protecting the normal order of Tibetan Buddhism.
- Reincarnating living Buddhas should respect the religious rituals and historically established systems of Tibetan Buddhism, but may not re-establish feudal privileges which have already been abolished.
- Reincarnating living Buddhas shall not be interfered with or be under the dominion of any foreign organization or individual.
- Article 3: Reincarnating living Buddhas should have the following conditions:
- (1) A majority of local religious believers and the monastery management organization must request the reincarnation;
- (2) The inheritance lineage should be real and have continued to the present day;
- (3) The monastery applying for the living Buddha reincarnation must be the monastery at which the living Buddha monk is registered, it must be registered as a Tibetan Buddhist place of religious activity, and it must have the ability to train and raise living Buddhas.
- Article 4: Applicants to be reincarnating living Buddhas who have any of the following conditions may not be reincarnated:
- (1) Reincarnations which are not regulated by the religious doctrine of Tibetan Buddhism;
- (2) Those in city-level people's governments and above with delineated districts, which ordered no reincarnations to be permitted.
- Article 5: Reincarnating living Buddhas should carry out application and approval procedures. The application and approval procedure is: the management organization at the monastery applying for the living Buddha reincarnation where the monk is registered, or the local Buddhist Association, should submit applications for reincarnations to the local religious affairs departments at the level of people's government above county-level; once the people's government above county-level has made suggestions, the people's government religious affairs department reports upwards, and examination and approval shall be made by the provincial or autonomous regional people's government religious affairs department. Living Buddha reincarnations who have a relatively large impact shall be reported to the provincial or autonomous regional people's government for approval; those with a great impact shall be reported to the State Administration for Religious Affairs for approval; those with a particularly great impact shall be reported to the State Council for approval.
- Verification and authorization of the living Buddha application should solicit the opinions of the corresponding Buddhist Association.
- Article 6: When there is debate over the size of a living Buddha's impact, the China Buddhist Association shall officiate, and report to the State Administration of Religious Affairs to be put on the record.
- Article 7: Once an application for a living Buddha's reincarnation has received approval, depending on the size of the living Buddha's impact, the corresponding Buddhist Association shall establish a reincarnation guidance team; the management organization at the monastery where the living Buddha is registered, or the corresponding Buddhist Association, shall establish a search team to look for the reincarnate soul child, and search affairs shall be carried out under the leadership of the guidance team.
- The reincarnate soul child shall be recognized by the provincial or autonomous regional Buddhist Association or the China Buddhist Association in accordance with religious rituals and historically established systems.
- No group or individual may without authorization carry out any activities related to searching for or recognizing reincarnating living Buddha soul children.
- Article 8: Living Buddhas which have historically been recognized by drawing lots from the golden urn shall have their reincarnating soul children recognized by drawing lots from the golden urn.
- Requests not to use drawing lots from the golden urn shall be reported by the provincial or autonomous regional people's government religious affairs departments to the State Administration of Religious Affairs for approval; cases with a particularly large impact shall be reported to the State Council for approval.
- Article 9: Once a reincarnating living Buddha soul child has been recognized, it shall be reported the provincial or autonomous regional people's government religious affairs department for approval; those with a great impact shall be reported to the State Administration for Religious Affairs for approval; those with a particularly great impact shall be reported to the State Council for approval.
- Reincarnating living Buddhas who have been approved by the provincial or autonomous regional people's government religious affairs departments or by the autonomous regional people's government shall be reported to the State Administration of Religious Affairs to be put on record.
- Article 10: When the reincarnating living Buddha is installed, a representative of the approving authority shall read out the documents of approval, and the corresponding Buddhist Association shall issue a living Buddha permit.
- Living Buddha permits shall uniformly be issued by the China Buddhist Association and reported to the State Administration of Religious Affairs to be put on record.
- Article 11: Persons and units who are responsible for being in contravention of these measures and who without authority carry out living Buddha reincarnation affairs, shall be dealt administrative sanction by the people's government religious affairs departments in accordance with stipulations in the "Regulations on Religious Affairs"; when a crime has been constituted, criminal responsibility shall be pursued.
- Article 12: When the reincarnating living Buddha has been installed the management organization at the monastery where he is registered shall formulate a training plan, recommend a scripture teacher, and submit the plan to the local Buddhist Association, which shall report upward to the provincial or autonomous regional people's government religious affairs department for approval.
- Article 13: Provinces and autonomous regions which are involved in affairs of reincarnating living Buddhas may formulate and implement detailed measures in accordance these measures, and report them to the State Administration of Religious Affairs to be put on record.
- Article 14: These measures shall be implemented from September 1, 2007.

=== August 2007 Decree ===
On August 3, 2007, China's State Administration for Religious Affairs issued a decree that all the reincarnations of tulkus of Tibetan Buddhism must get government approval, otherwise they are "illegal or invalid". The decree states, "It is an important move to institutionalize management on reincarnation of living Buddhas. The selection of reincarnates must preserve national unity and solidarity of all ethnic groups and the selection process cannot be influenced by any group or individual from outside the country." It also requires that temples which apply for reincarnation of a living Buddha must be "legally-registered venues for Tibetan Buddhism activities and are capable of fostering and offering proper means of support for the living Buddha."

Reincarnation Applications have to be submitted to four governmental bodies for approval, specifically the religious affairs department of the provincial-level government, the provincial-level government, State Administration for Religious Affairs, and the State Council.

=== Regulations ===
The state-run China Daily reported the regulations are composed of 14 articles, including the principle, conditions, approval procedures, the duties and responsibilities of religious groups for reincarnation as well as punishment for those violating the regulations. They allegedly guarantee normal religious activities of Tibetan Buddhism and protect the religious belief of Tibetan Buddhism followers according to law.

The China Daily also reported the State Administration for Religious Affairs said, "The government only administrate religious affairs related to state and the public interests and will not interfere in the pure internal religious affairs".

=== Impact ===
On 4 August 2007, Xinhua News Agency reported the new rules are "an important move to institutionalise management of reincarnation of living Buddhas". Tulkus are indeed an important element in Tibetan Buddhism, forming a clergy of influential religious figures. It is believed they are continuously reincarnated to take up their positions anew. Often there is more than one candidate competing to be recognised as the actual reincarnation, and the authority to decide who is the true claimant carries significant power.

According to the Chinese government, the decree was allegedly implemented in response to clergy's protests about the reincarnation of living Buddhas "against religious ritual and historical convention". According to the CCP-run China Daily, "over 1,000 living Buddhas" have been reincarnated through this "legal channel" in Tibet and other areas in China since 1991.

== Spiritual tradition versus golden urn ==
During the historical priest and patron relationship between independent Tibet and the Chinese empire, documents mention golden urns created by the Qing Qianlong Emperor to allow the Emperor of China to determine the reincarnation of the Dalai Lama and the Panchen Lama, in case of a dispute.

Neither the 13th Dalai Lama Tubten Gyatso nor the 14th Dalai Lama Tenzin Gyatso used a golden urn. In 1877, request to exempt the 13th Dalai Lama from using lot-drawing process was approved by the Central Government. On 26 January 1940, the Regent Reting Rinpoche requested the Central Government to exempt Lhamo Dhondup from lot-drawing process using Golden Urn to become the 14th Dalai Lama. The request was approved by the Central Government. It is disputed whether or not a golden urn was used for the 10th Dalai Lama Tsultrim Gyatso, but Lot-drawing result was reported and approved by emperor.

There were two golden urns prepared by the Qianlong Emperor. One is enshrined in Jokhang Temple in Lhasa for choosing Dalai and Panchen Lama reincarnations, the other is in Yonghe Temple in Beijing for choosing Mongolian Jebtsundamba Khutughtu reincarnations. In 1936, a golden urn was said to be used as a Method of Reincarnation of Lamas《喇嘛轉世辦法》by Mongolian and Tibetan Affairs Commission of the Central Government.

In Mongolia, the Khalkha Mongol nobles' power was deliberately undermined by Qianlong when he appointed the Tibetan Ishi-damba-nima of the Lithang royal family of the eastern Tibetans as the 3rd reincarnated Jebtsundamba Khutuktu Lama instead of the Khalkha Mongol which they wanted to be appointed. The decision was first protested against by the Outer Mongol Khalkha nobles and then the Khalkhas sought to have him placed at a distance from them at Dolonnor, but Qianlong snubbed both of their requests, sending the message that he was putting an end to Outer Mongolian autonomy. The decision to make Tibet the only place where the reincarnation came from was intentional by the Qing to curtail the Mongols.

== See also ==
- Golden Urn
- 29-Article Ordinance for the More Effective Governing of Tibet
- Jebtsundamba Khutuktu
- Choekyi Gyaltsen, 10th Panchen Lama
- Yeshe Gyatso
- 6th Dalai Lama
- Afterlife
- Bodhisattva
- History of the People's Republic of China
- Freedom of religion in China
