= Shirin Dorje Pohang =

Coordinates: 29.64878°N 91.11142°E

Shirin Dorje Pohang or Shirin Dorjee Pho Zhang (Chinese: 雪林多吉颇章, Tibetan: ཞོལ་གླིང་རྡོ་རྗེ་ཕོ་བྲང, Wylie: zhol gling rdo rje pho brang) is the palace of Panchen Lama, located in Lhasa, Tibet Autonomous Region, China.

== History ==
The building was completed in 1956 on the site of the former Xuezelingka (Chinese: 雪策林卡). The building is adjacent to the office building of the Preparatory Committee for the Tibet Autonomous Region, which was completed in 1956.

On November 29, 1995, at 4:00 p.m., the ceremony of the enthronement of the 11th Panchen Lama was held in Shirin Dorjee Pohang. At the ceremony, State Councilor Luo Gan, a representative of the State Council of the People's Republic of China, announced the State Council's "Reply on the Approval for the Succession of Khyentse Norbu, Recognized as the 11th Banchen Erdeni by the Golden Urn" issued on that day.

In October 2004, Lhasa's Shirin Dorjee Pohang and Shigatse's Deqing Gesang Pohang (Chinese: 德庆格桑颇章) started to rebuild, this time by the central government to allocate more than 50 million yuan, all the projects in accordance with the requirements of cultural relics maintenance, and add a lot of life functions and religious traditional crafts, murals and paintings and other projects. In September 2006, the 11th Panchen Erdeni visited the two repair works when the main works at both sites were fully completed.
