= Soul boy =

Soul boy may refer to:

- Reincarnated soul boy, title used in Tibetan Buddhism
- Soulboy, English youth subculture
- Soul Boy (song), a song by Paul McCartney
- Soulboy (album), 2005 studio album by Khalil Fong
- Soulboy (film), 2010 British film
- Soul Boy, 2010 Kenyan film
