= Reincarnated soul boy =

Administration of reincarnation in Tibetan buddhism

Reincarnated soul boy (Chinese: 转世灵童) is the Chinese title used in the reincarnation process of living Buddhas in Tibetan Buddhism, it is a title for reincarnated practitioners before they formally become living Buddhas.

The reincarnated soul boy is identified by traditional methods. Generally speaking, there can be one or more candidates. After a sitting-in-the-bed ceremony is held, he will become a living Buddha.

In 1793, 29-Article Ordinance for the More Effective Governing of Tibet (Chinese: 钦定藏内善后章程二十九条) was published, it states that to eliminate cheating and corruption in the selection process, the Golden Urn must be used for reincarnated soul boys so one soul boy can be picked to become the living Buddha.

In 2007, the State Religious Affairs Bureau Order No. 5 (Chinese: 国家宗教事务局令第5号) was published by the Central Government. Article 7 states that no group or individual may carry out activities related to searching for and identifying the reincarnated soul boy of the Living Buddha without authorization. Article 8 states that lot-drawing ceremony with Golden Urn is applicable to those rinpoches, or lamas who were reincarnated previously in history. Request of exemption is handled by State Administration for Religious Affairs, for those with great impact, request of exemption is handled by State Council.

== See also ==
- Golden Urn
