= Office building of the Preparatory Committee for the Tibet Autonomous Region =

The Office building of the Preparatory Committee for the Tibet Autonomous Region (Chinese: 西藏自治区筹备委员会办公楼) is located in Lhasa, Tibet Autonomous Region, China.

== History ==
The building was completed in 1956 on the site of the former Xuezelingka (Chinese: 雪策林卡) for the Preparatory Committee for the Tibet Autonomous Region. The building is adjacent to the Shirin Dorje Pohang (Chinese: 雪林多吉颇章), which was completed in 1956. The building is now in the compound of the CPC TAR Committee, and was recognized as a Tibet Autonomous Region Cultural Relics Protection Unit (Chinese: 西藏自治区文物保护单位) in 2009.
