= Thomas Manning (sinologist) =

British sinologist and explorer (1772–1840)

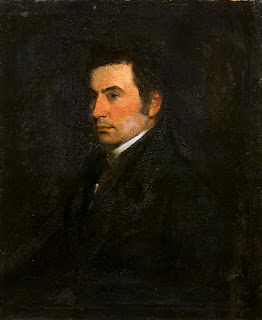
Thomas Manning, painting, Royal Asiatic Society, London

Thomas Manning (8 November 1772 – 1840) is considered the first lay Chinese studies scholar in Europe and was the first Englishman to enter Lhasa, the holy city of Tibet.

== Early life ==
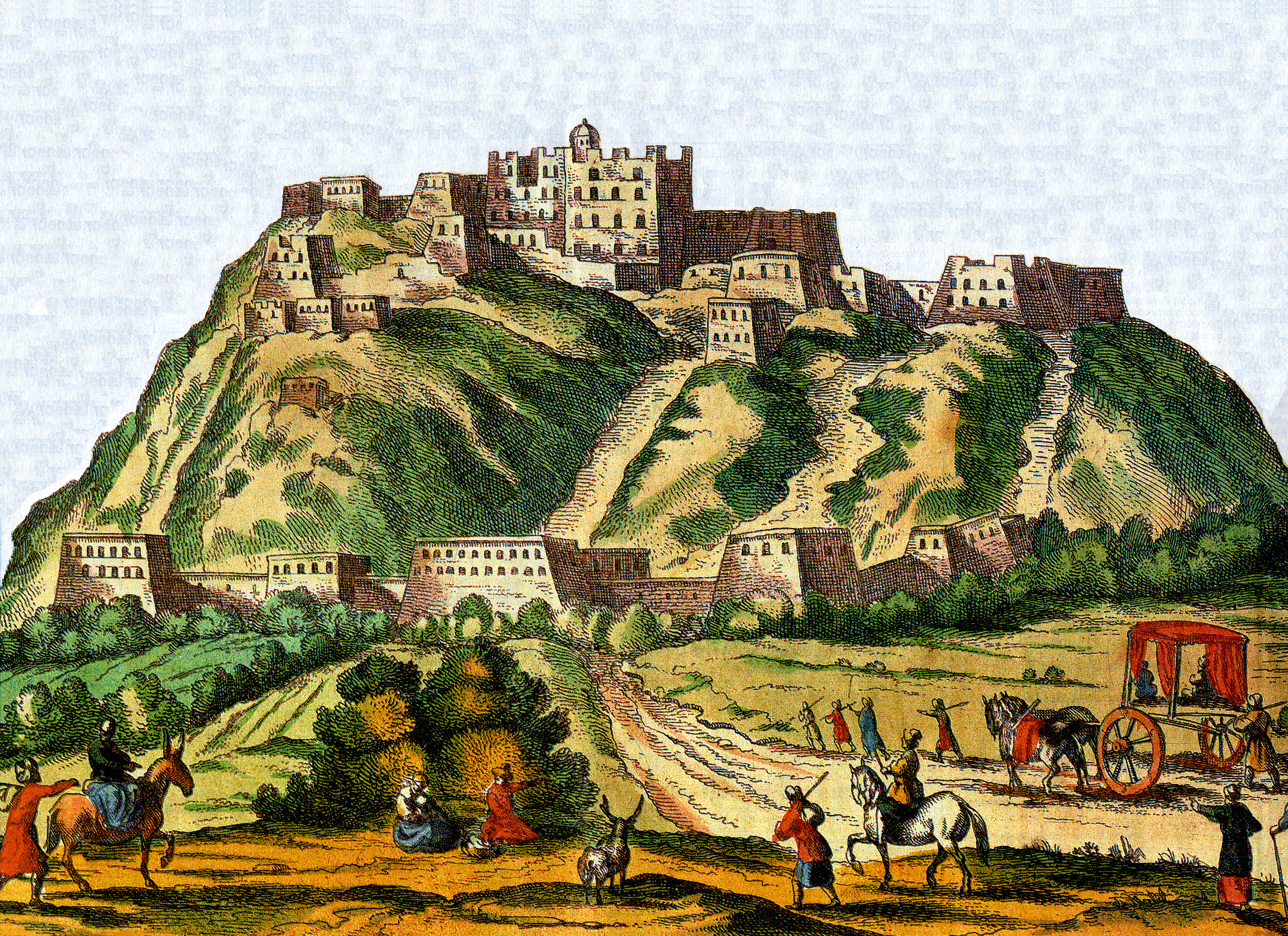
Potala Palace, Lhasa (Athanasius Kircher: China Illustrata, 1667) or Johann Grueber 1661 ?

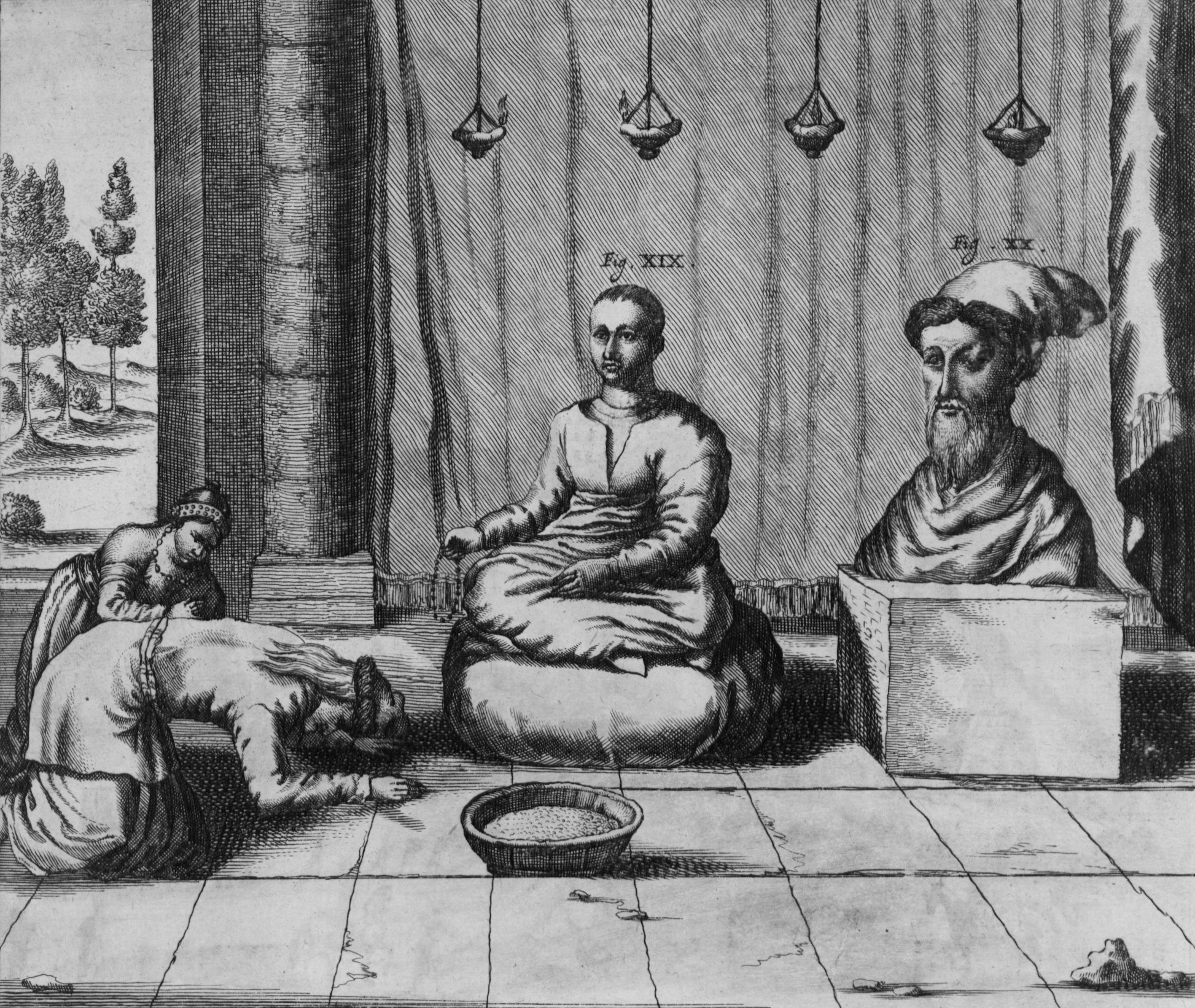
Dalai Lama (Athanasius Kircher: China Illustrata, 1667)

Manning was born in Broome, Norfolk. After leaving school, he entered Gonville and Caius College, Cambridge to study mathematics where he became a friend of future writer and essayist Charles Lamb and was expected to achieve Second Wrangler. However, his eccentricity and a "strong repugnance to oaths" meant that he left before graduation. Long devoted to Chinese studies, he studied medicine and Chinese at Paris from 1800 to 1803.

== China and Tibet ==
After making his way to Canton (now Guangzhou) on the south coast of China, Manning procured a letter of introduction from the Select Committee of the East India Company (EIC) to then Governor-General of India Lord Minto. The letter requested that he be given "every practicable assistance in the prosecution of his plans". In practice Manning received little official help but with a single Chinese servant named Zhao - a Roman Catholic convert who spoke Latin fluently - he travelled through Bhutan into Tibet, arriving in Phari at the head of the Chumbi Valley on 21 October 1811. The imperial resident commissioner (amban) of Qing arrived on 31 October and promised to write immediately to the Qing official in Lhasa seeking permission for Manning to proceed. His medical skills were much in demand and led to a request to travel on with the amban to Gyantse, a journey made uncomfortable by the extreme cold and an unpredictable horse. In Gyantse, he continued to practice medicine while waiting for the necessary passport to travel on to Lhasa. This was duly granted and on 17 December 1811, he had an audience with the 9th Dalai Lama, Lungtok Gyatso, at the Potala Palace. As the Dalai Lama was only seven years old, the interview was short and consisted of only a few remarks to Manning translated first from Tibetan to Chinese and then into Latin which Manning used to speak with Zhao.

Manning remained in Lhasa for several months during which he had several further audiences with the Dalai Lama. The local amban of the region, however, suspicious of Manning's cover story claiming to be a Buddhist lama from India, sent an official report to the Qing court in Peking conveying his suspicions that Manning was most likely a Christian missionary in disguise. While awaiting the Qing Court's response to the amban's report, Manning and Zhao were effectively held as prisoners in Lhasa, with Manning eventually forced to sell off several of his possessions when his funds ran low. Orders finally arrived from the Qing court in February 1812, questioning why an alleged Buddhist lama from British-ruled Calcutta would make the grueling trip to Lhasa, before ultimately accusing Manning of being a foreign missionary and ordering him to return the way he came. Manning was allowed to depart Lhasa on 19 April, although Zhao was imprisoned on charges of treason and never seen again, before ultimately arriving in Koch Bihar on 10 June 1812. Not only had Manning become the first Englishman to visit Lhasa, but also the first to obtain interviews with the Dalai Lama. He subsequently concluded that the Tibetans had an intense dislike for the Chinese and "would view the Chinese influence in Tibet overthrown without many emotions of regret, especially if the rulers under the new influence were to treat the Grand Lama with respect."

In 1817, as a member of Lord Amherst's British delegation, Manning reached China for the first time. But the delegation was not accepted by the Qing China's Jiaqing Emperor and was forced to leave Peking some days later. Traveling back to England, he met Napoleon on the island of Saint Helena, where the emperor spent the last six years of his life under British supervision. Manning suffered a stroke in 1838 and moved to Bath where he died in 1840.

== Manning's work ==
Manning never published anything regarding his journey, and its occurrence was known to few, until his narrative was printed, through the zeal of Sir Clements Markham, secretary of the Royal Geographical Society, in 1876.

In his journal he described his meeting with the 7-year-old 9th Dalai Lama: "the nice and fascinating figure caught my whole attention and it was a pleasure to talk to this well educated little prince." He also described the occupation of Tibet by the Chinese: "I was struck with the appearance of everything being perfecly Chinese." If Manning was impressed by the Potala palace, his admiration stopped there. "If the palace had exceeded my expectations," he wrote, "the town as far fell short of them. There is nothing striking, nothing pleasing in its appearance. The habitations are begrimed with smut and dirt. The avenues are full of dogs, some growling and gnawing bits of hide which lie around in profusion, and emit a charnel-house smell; other limping and looking livid; others ulcerated; others starved and dying, and pecked at by the ravens; some dead and preyed upon. In short everything seems mean and gloomy, and excites the idea of something unreal."

Manning was the "friend M." of Charles Lamb, from whom "Elia" professes to have got that translation of a Chinese MS. which furnished the Dissertation upon roast pig. A number of letters from Manning to Charles Lamb have survived and are contained in a book edited by G.A. Anderson published by Harper & Brother, New York, 1926.
