= Tenpai Wangchuk, 8th Panchen Lama =

Panchen Lama of Tibet

- Tenpai Wangchuk

Tibetan name
- Tibetan: བསྟན་པའི་དབང་ཕྱུག་་
Transcriptions
- Wylie: Bstan-pa'i Dbang-phyug
- Tibetan Pinyin: Dainbai Wangqug

Tenpai Wangchuk (1855–1882) was the eighth Panchen Lama of Tibet.

8th Panchen Lama, Tenpai Wangchuk, also known as Namgyal Wangdui Gyaltsen, was born in 1855 in Namling County (རྣམ་གླིང་རྫོང་། 南木林), Shigatse prefecture, western Tibet. He was born into an aristocratic family of Nyingma school. One member of his family was an incarnation of Nyingma school. The fact that the new Panchen Lama came from a different tradition created a discontent among the Tashilhunpo Monastery monks (who profess the Gelug tradition). His father's name was Tenzin Wangjia and his mother's name was Zhaxila (Chinese transcription).

In 1857 Tenpai Wangchuk was identified as the eighth incarnation of the Panchen Lama. He was the first Panchen Lama to be identified by drawing a lot from the Golden Urn. In 1860 Tenpai Wangchuk (aged 5), in the presence of Reting Rinpoche Hutukthu, was finally enthroned as the 8th incarnation of Panchen Lama in the Tashilhunpo Monastery.

In 1877 (or 1878) Tenpai Wangchuk along with regent Tenzin Hutukthu identified the 13th Dalai Lama using the Golden Urn. The 8th Panchen Lama died in 1882 in the age of 27.

All the tombs from the Fifth to the Ninth Panchen Lamas were destroyed during the Cultural Revolution and have been rebuilt by the 10th Panchen Lama with a huge tomb at Tashilhunpo Monastery in Shigatse, known as the Tashi Langyar.

Preceded by Palden Tenpai Nyima	Reincarnation of the Panchen Lama	Succeeded by Thubten Choekyi Nyima
