= 11th Dalai Lama =

Spiritual leader of Tibet from 1842 to 1855

11th Dalai Lama, Khedrup Gyatso
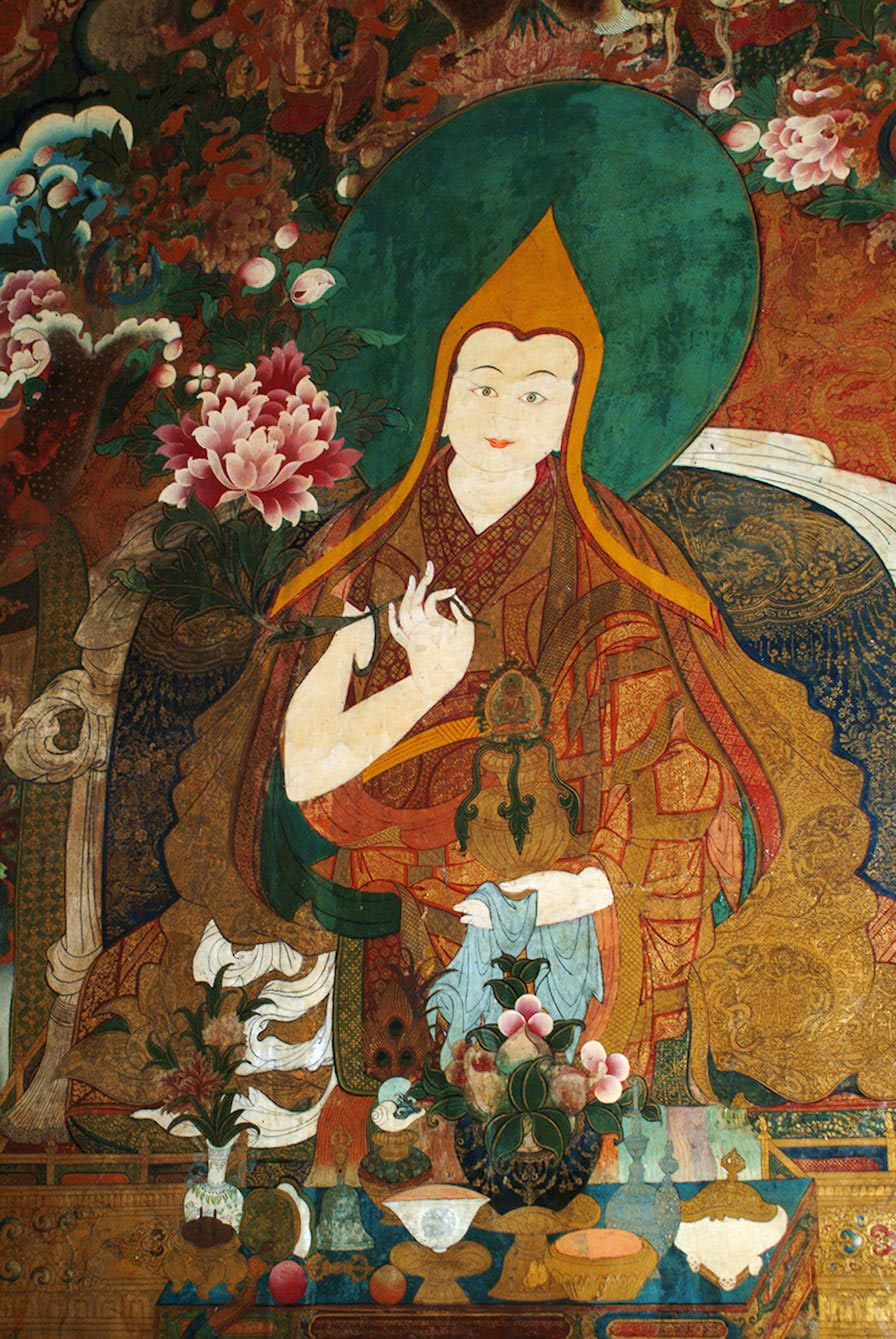
- Title: His Holiness the 11th Dalai Lama

Personal life
- Born: 1 November 1838 Garthang Monastery, Kham, Qing Tibet
- Died: 31 January 1856 (aged 17) Potala Palace, Lhasa, Qing Tibet
- Parents: Tsewang Dondrup (father); Yungdrung Butri (mother)

Religious life
- Religion: Tibetan Buddhism

Senior posting
- Period in office: 1842–1855
- Predecessor: 10th Dalai Lama, Tsultrim Gyatso
- Successor: 12th Dalai Lama, Trinley Gyatso

Tibetan name
- Tibetan: མཁས་གྲུབ་རྒྱ་མཚོ་
Transcriptions
- Wylie: mkhas grub rgya mtsho

The 11th Dalai Lama, Khedrup Gyatso (Tibetan: མཁས་གྲུབ་རྒྱ་མཚོ་, Wylie: Mkhas Grub Rgya Mtsho) (1 November 1838 – 31 January 1856) was recognized by the Ganden Tripa as the 11th Dalai Lama of Tibet and enthroned in 1842. He enlarged the Norbulingka, studied at Sera Monastery, Drepung Monastery and Ganden Monastery, and taught students.

He was recognised as the 11th Dalai Lama in 1841, after being born in Garthang near Dartsedo, the same village where the 7th Dalai Lama, Kelzang Gyatso was born in 1708. He was taken to Lhasa and in 1842, the 7th Panchen Lama, Lobzang Tenpai Nyima, gave him refuge vows, cut his hair and gave him the name of Khedrup Gyatso.

In 1842, he was enthroned as the 11th Dalai Lama in the Potala Palace on the Full Moon day of the 4th Lunar month (24 May 1842). In 1846 he became a preliminary monk (rab byung), and in 1848 at the age of eleven years he took the getsul novice vows of monkhood, while both were bestowed by the 7th Panchen Lama

He had a residence at the Norbulingka built in 1848, and participated in the annual Zhoton summer festival in Lhasa, while also traveling on pilgrimage to Samye Monastery, Mount Kailash and its Lake Manasarovar, and to other places. He gave public audiences, taught, and stood for his examinations in 1852 and 1853, and passed.

He wrote a book of stanzas, Story of the Monkeys and Birds (Bya sprel gyi gtam-rgyud). It is an allegory of the war at the end of the 18th century between the Tibetans and the Gurkhas ('birds' and 'monkeys' respectively).

He assumed political leadership on the request of Daoguang Emperor in 1855 but died less than one year later on 31 January 1856, becoming the third successive Dalai Lama who died at a young age.

"During the period of the short-lived Dalai Lamas—from the Ninth to the Twelfth incarnations—the Panchen Lama was the lama of the hour, filling the void left by the four Dalai Lamas who died in their youth."

Buddhist titles
Preceded by Tsultrim Gyatso	Dalai Lama; 1842–1856; Recognized in 1841	Succeeded by Trinley Gyatso
