= 12th Dalai Lama =

Spiritual leader of Tibet from 1860 to 1875

12th Dalai Lama, Trinley Gyatso
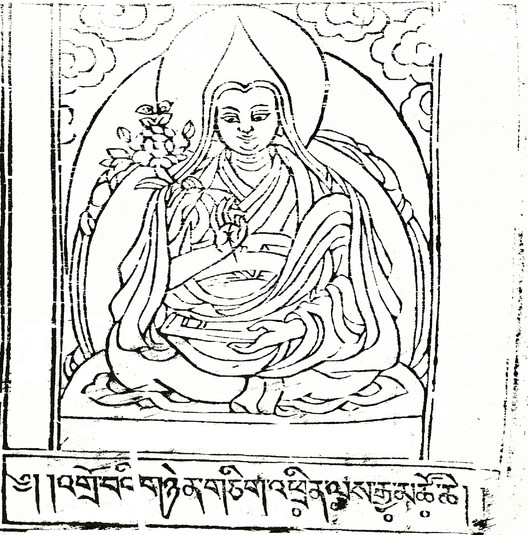
- Title: His Holiness the 12th Dalai Lama

Personal life
- Born: 28 December 1856 Lhoka, Ü-Tsang, Tibet, Qing Dynasty
- Died: 25 April 1875 (aged 18) Lhasa, Tibet, Qing Dynasty

Religious life
- Religion: Tibetan Buddhism

Senior posting
- Period in office: 1860–1875
- Predecessor: 11th Dalai Lama, Khedrup Gyatso
- Successor: 13th Dalai Lama, Thubten Gyatso

Tibetan name
- Tibetan: འཕྲིན་ལས་རྒྱ་མཚོ།
Transcriptions
- Wylie: 'phrin las rgya mtsho

Trinley Gyatso also spelled: Thinle Gyatso (Tibetan: འཕྲིན་ལས་རྒྱ་མཚོ།, Wylie: Phrin Las Rgya Mtsho) (28 December 1856 – 25 April 1875) was the 12th Dalai Lama of Tibet.

His short life coincided with a time of major political unrest and wars among Tibet's neighbours. The British Empire, which controlled India, was expanding its influence northwards, while the Qing dynasty, weakened by the Opium Wars and the Taiping Rebellion, lost influence in Tibet, leaving the Tibetans politically adrift.

He was recognised as a reincarnation of the Dalai Lama in 1858 and enthroned in 1860. During his period of training as a child, Tibet banned Europeans from entering the country due to British wars with Sikkim and Bhutan, both of whom were controlled to a considerable degree by the lamas in Lhasa. These wars were seen as efforts to colonise Tibet—something seen as unacceptable by the lamas. Also, with Christian missionaries threatening to enter Tibet via the Mekong and Salween Rivers, Tibetans tried to emphasize the Qing dynasty's authority over Tibet in the 1860s.

Trinley Gyatso was fully enthroned as Dalai Lama on 11 March 1873 but could not stamp his full authority on Tibet because he died of a mysterious illness on 25 April 1875.

"During the period of the short-lived Dalai Lamas—from the Ninth to the Twelfth incarnations—the Panchen was the lama of the hour, filling the void left by the four Dalai Lamas who died in their youth."

Buddhist titles
Preceded by Khedrup Gyatso	Dalai Lama; 1860–1875; Recognized in 1858	Succeeded by Thubten Gyatso
