= 8th Dalai Lama =

Spiritual leader of Tibet from 1762 to 1804

8th Dalai Lama, Jamphel Gyatso
- འཇམ་དཔལ་རྒྱ་མཚོ
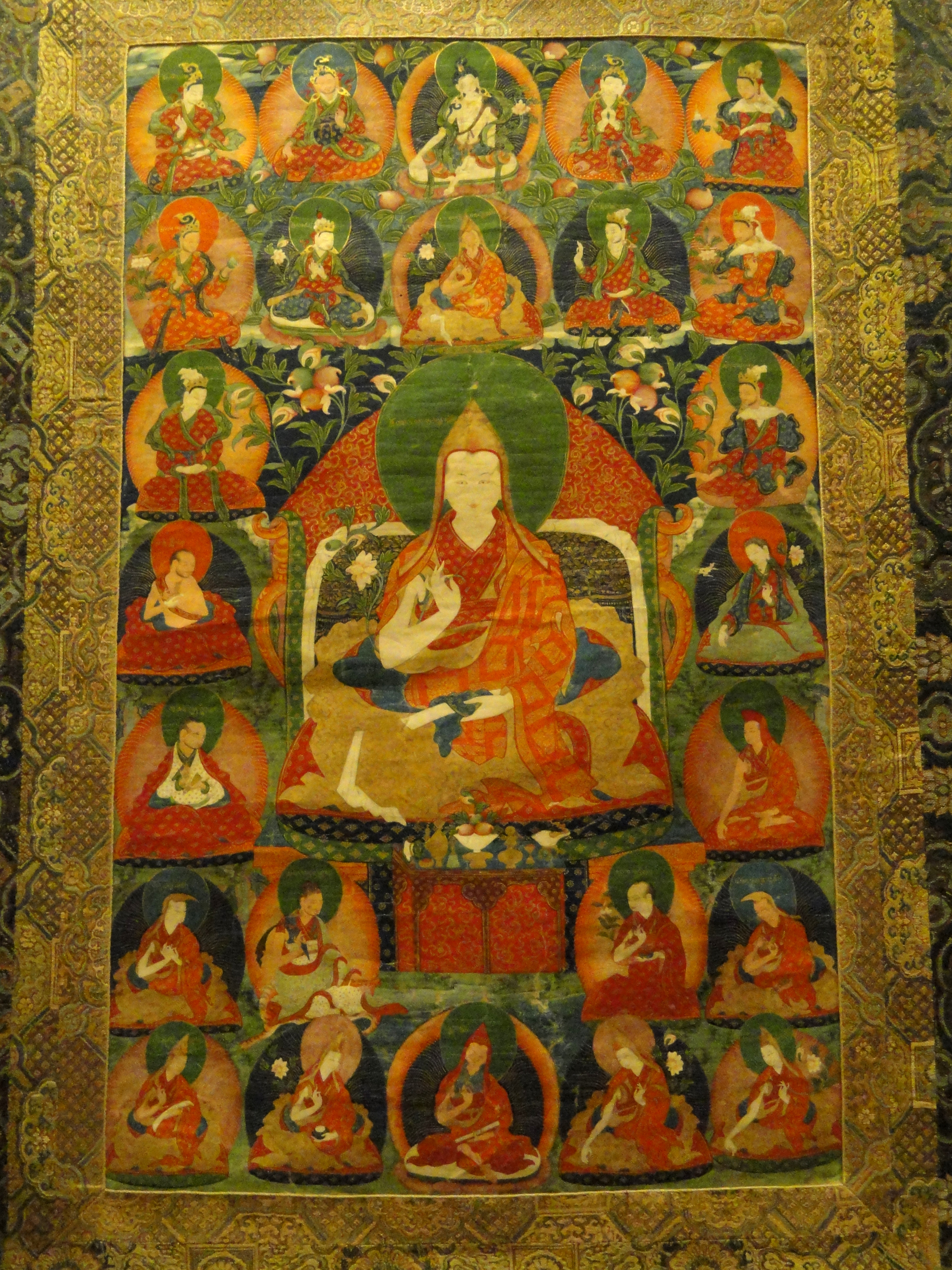
- Title: 8th Dalai Lama

Personal life
- Born: c. 1758 Thobgyal, Ü-Tsang, Tibet,
- Died: 1804 (aged 45–46) Tibet

Religious life
- Religion: Tibetan Buddhism

Senior posting
- Period in office: 1762–1804
- Predecessor: 7th Dalai Lama, Kelzang Gyatso
- Successor: 9th Dalai Lama, Lungtok Gyatso

Tibetan name
- Tibetan: འཇམ་དཔལ་རྒྱ་མཚོ།
Transcriptions
- Wylie: 'jam dpal rgya mtsho

The 8th Dalai Lama, Jamphel Gyatso (Tibetan: འཇམ་དཔལ་རྒྱ་མཚོ་, Wylie: Jam Dpal Rgya Mtsho) (1758–1804) was recognized as the 8th Dalai Lama of Tibet.

Born in 1758 at Lhari Gang (Tob-rgyal Lha-ri Gang) in the Upper Ü-Tsang region of southwestern Tibet his father, Sonam Dhargye and mother, Phuntsok Wangmo, were originally from Kham. They were distant descendants of Dhrala Tsegyal, who was one of the major heroes of the Gesar epic.

== Traditional history ==
He was escorted to Lhasa and enthroned as the leader of the Tibetan people in the Potala Palace in 7th month of the Water Horse Year (1762) when he was five years old (four by Western reckoning). The enthronement ceremony was presided over by Demo Tulku Jamphel Yeshi, the first of a series of Regents to represent the Dalai Lamas when they were minors. The ceremony was held in the 'Beyond Mind Temple of the Second Potala'.

He was the disciple of Yongzin Yeshe Gyaltsen, the Kushok Bakula Rinpoche.

The country continued to be ruled by regents until the Wood Dragon Year (1784) when the Regent was sent as an ambassador to China and the Dalai Lama ruled alone until 1790, when the Regent returned to help Jamphel Gyatso. In 1788 there was a conflict with Nepali wool traders leading to a skirmish with the Gurkhas. In 1790 the Gurkhas invaded southern Tibet and conquered several provinces including Nyalam and Gyirong. The city of Shigatse and the Tashilhunpo Monastery were captured and looted but the Gurkhas were driven back to Nepal in 1791 after the Qing dynasty sent troops to Tibet. A peace treaty between the Qing dynasty and Gurkhas was agreed on in 1796.

=== Norbulingka Park and Summer Palace and other activities ===
He built the Norbulingka Park and Summer Palace in 1783 on the outskirts of Lhasa. He also commissioned an exquisite copper statue of the Buddha for the people of Southern Tibet which was brought into India in the 1960s and is now housed at the Library of Tibetan Works & Archives, Dharamsala, India.

=== Later life ===
"He was a mild and contemplative person with no great interest in temporal affairs and although he lived to be 45 [44 by Western reckoning], for most of his life he was content to let a Regent conduct the administration."

He died in 1804 at the age of 47 (46 by Western reckoning).

== Footnotes ==
- Khetsun Sangpo Rinpoche. (1982). "Life and times of the Eighth to Twelfth Dalai Lamas." The Tibet Journal. Vol. VII Nos. 1 & 2. Spring/Summer 1982, pp. 47–48.
- https://web.archive.org/web/20051213024822/http://www.dalailama.com/page.51.htm

Buddhist titles
Preceded by Kelzang Gyatso	Dalai Lama; 1762–1804; Recognized in 1760	Succeeded by Lungtok Gyatso
