= 13th Dalai Lama =

Spiritual leader of Tibet from 1879 to 1933

13th Dalai Lama, Thubten Gyatso
- ཐུབ་བསྟན་རྒྱ་མཚོ
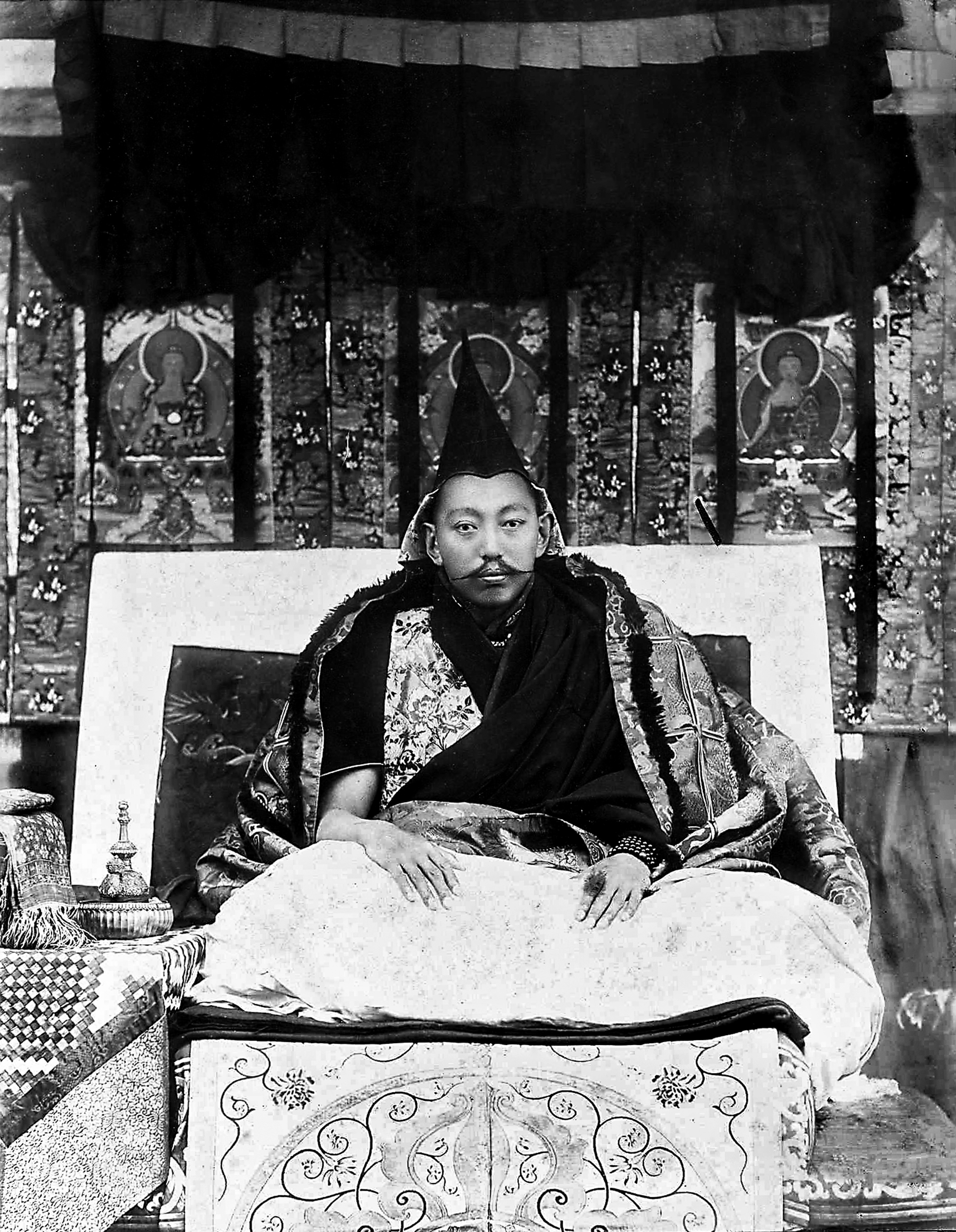
- Photograph by M. Sain, 1910
- Title: His Holiness the 13th Dalai Lama

Personal life
- Born: 12 February 1876 Thakpo Langdun, Ü-Tsang, Tibet
- Died: 17 December 1933 (aged 57) Lhasa, Tibet
- Resting place: Potala Palace
- Home town: Lhasa
- Known for: 13th Dalai Lama
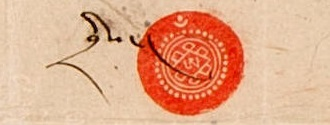
- Signature

Religious life
- Religion: Tibetan Buddhism
- Ordination: 1895

Senior posting
- Teacher: Phurchok Ngawang Jampa Rinpoche
- Period in office: 31 July 1879 – 17 December 1933
- Predecessor: 12th Dalai Lama, Trinley Gyatso
- Successor: 14th Dalai Lama, Tenzin Gyatso

Military service
- Rank: Dalai Lama
- Battles/wars: British Expedition to Tibet

The 13th Dalai Lama (born Thubten Gyatso; full spiritual name: Ngawang Lobsang Thupten Gyatso Jigdral Chokley Namgyal; Tibetan: ཐུབ་བསྟན་རྒྱ་མཚོ་, Wylie: Thub Bstan Rgya Mtsho) (12 February 1876 – 17 December 1933) was the 13th Dalai Lama of Tibet enthroned during a turbulent modern era. He presided during the collapse of the Qing dynasty, and is referred to as "the Great Thirteenth", responsible for redeclaring Tibet's national independence, and for his national reform and modernization initiatives.

In 1878, he was recognized as the reincarnation of the Dalai Lama. He was escorted to Lhasa and given his pre-novice vows by the Panchen Lama, Tenpai Wangchuk, and given the name "Ngawang Lobsang Thupten Gyatso Jigdral Chokley Namgyal". In 1879, he was enthroned at the Potala Palace, but did not assume political power until 1895, after he had reached his maturity.

Thubten Gyatso was an intellectual reformer and skillful politician. He was responsible for rebuilding Tibet's geopolitical position after the British expedition to Tibet, restoring discipline in monastic life, and increasing the number of lay officials to avoid excessive power being placed in the hands of the monks.

== Early life ==
The 13th Dalai Lama was born in the village of Thakpo Langdun, one day by car, south-east from Lhasa, and near Samye Monastery, Takpo province, in June 1876 to parents Kunga Rinchen and Lobsang Dolma, a peasant couple. Laird gives his birthdate as 27 May 1876, and Mullin gives it as dawn on the 5th month of the Fire Mouse Year (1876).

== Contact with Agvan Dorzhiev ==
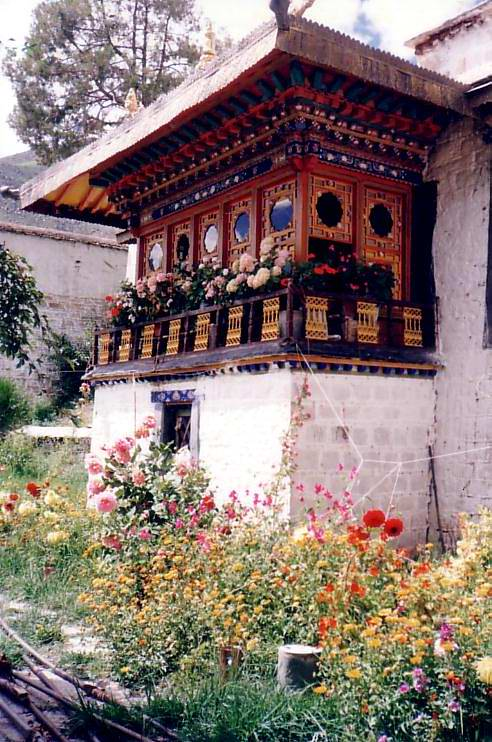
Retreat of the 13th Dalai Lama, Nechung, Tibet

Agvan Dorzhiev (1854–1938), a Khori-Buryat Mongol, and a Russian subject, was born in the village of Khara-Shibir, not far from Udinsk, to the east of Lake Baikal. He left home in 1873 at age 19 to study at the Gelugpa monastery, Drepung, near Lhasa, the largest monastery in Tibet. Having successfully completed the traditional course of religious studies, he began the academic Buddhist degree of Geshey Lharampa (the highest level of 'Doctorate of Buddhist Philosophy'). He continued his studies to become Tsanid-Hambo, or "Master of Buddhist Philosophy". He became a tutor and "debating partner" of the teenage Dalai Lama, who became very friendly with him and later used him as an envoy to Russia and other countries.

== Military expeditions in Tibet ==
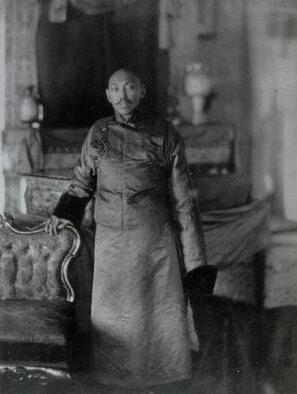
The 13th Dalai Lama in 1910 in Darjeeling, India

After the British expedition to Tibet by Sir Francis Younghusband in early 1904, Dorzhiev convinced the Dalai Lama to flee to Urga in Mongolia, almost 2,400 km (1,500 mi) to the northeast of Lhasa, a journey which took four months. The Dalai Lama spent over a year in Urga and the Wang Khuree Monastery (to the west from the capital) giving teachings to the Mongolians. In Urga he met the 8th Bogd Gegeen Jebtsundamba Khutuktu several times (the spiritual leader of Outer Mongolia). The content of these meetings is unknown. According to report from A.D. Khitrovo, the Russian Border Commissioner in Kyakhta, the Dalai Lama and the influential Mongol Khutuktus, high lamas and princes "irrevocably decided to secede from China as an independent federal state, carrying out this operation under the patronage and support from Russia, taking care to avoid the bloodshed". The Dalai Lama insisted that if Russia would not help, he would even ask Britain, his former foe, for assistance.

After the Dalai Lama fled, the Qing dynasty immediately proclaimed him deposed and again asserted sovereignty over Tibet, making claims over Nepal and Bhutan as well. The Treaty of Lhasa was signed at the Potala between Great Britain and Tibet in the presence of the Amban and Nepalese and Bhutanese representatives on 7 September 1904. The provisions of the 1904 treaty were confirmed in a 1906 treaty signed between Britain and China. The British, for a fee from the Qing court, also agreed not to annex Tibetan territory or to interfere in the administration of Tibet, while China agreed not to permit any other foreign state to interfere with the territory or internal administration of Tibet.

The Dalai Lama is thought to have been involved with the anti-foreign 1905 Tibetan Rebellion. The British expedition to Tibet had profound repercussions in the Tibetan Buddhist world, leading to heavy anti-Western and anti-Christian sentiment among Tibetan Buddhists. The expedition also led to a sudden and heavy-handed Chinese intervention in Tibetan areas, to develop, assimilate, and bring the regions under strong Qing central control. The Tibetan Lamas in Batang proceeded to revolt in 1905, massacring Chinese officials, French missionaries, and Christian Catholic converts. The Tibetan monks opposed the Catholics, razing the Catholic mission's Church, and slaughtering all Catholic missionaries and Qing officials. The Manchu Qing official Fengquan was assassinated by the Tibetan Batang Lamas, along with other Manchu and Han Chinese Qing officials and the French Catholic priests, who were all massacred when the rebellion started in March 1905. Tibetan Gelugpa monks in Nyarong, Chamdo, and Litang also revolted and attacked missions and churches and slaughtered westerners. Christian missionaries and Qing officials were linked in the eyes of the Tibetans as hostile foreigners to be attacked. Zhongtian (Chungtien) was the location of Batang monastery. The Tibetans slaughtered the converts, torched the building of the missionaries in Batang due to their xenophobia. Sir Francis Edward Younghusband wrote that At the same time, on the opposite side of Tibet they were still more actively aggressive, expelling the Roman Catholic missionaries from their long-established homes at Batang, massacring many of their converts, and burning the mission-house. There was anti-Christian sentiment and xenophobia running rampant in Tibet.

No. 10. Despatch from Consul-General Wilkinson to Sir E. Satow, dated Yünnan-fu, 28th April, 1905. (Received in London 14th June, 1905.) Pere Maire, the Provicaire of the Roman Catholic Mission here, called this morning to show me a telegram which he had just received from a native priest of his Mission at Tali. The telegram, which is in Latin, is dated Tali, the 24th April, and is to the effect that the lamas of Batang have killed PP. Musset and Soulie, together with, it is believed, 200 converts. The chapel at Atentse has been burnt down, and the lamas hold the road to Tachien-lu. Pere Bourdonnec (another member of the French Tibet Mission) begs that Pere Maire will take action. Pere Maire has accordingly written to M. Leduc, my French colleague, who will doubtless communicate with the Governor-General. The Provicaire is of opinion that the missionaries were attacked by orders of the ex-Dalai Lama, as the nearest Europeans on whom he could avenge his disgrace. He is good enough to say that he will give me any further information which he may receive. I am telegraphing to you the news of the massacre.

— I have, &c., (Signed) W. H. WILKINSON. East India (Tibet): Papers Relating to Tibet [and Further Papers ...], Issues 2–4, Great Britain. Foreign Office, p. 12.,

In October 1906, John Weston Brooke was the first Englishman to gain an audience with the Dalai Lama, and subsequently he was granted permission to lead two expeditions into Tibet. Also in 1906, Sir Charles Alfred Bell, was invited to visit Thubten Chökyi Nyima, the 9th Panchen Lama at Tashilhunpo, where they had friendly discussions on the political situation.

The Dalai Lama later stayed at the great Kumbum Monastery near Xining and then travelled east to the most sacred of four Buddhist mountains in China, Wutai Shan located 300 km from Beijing. From here, the Dalai Lama received a parade of envoys: William Woodville Rockhill, the American Minister in Peking; Gustaf Mannerheim, an Imperial Russian army colonel, who later became the Marshal of Finland and the 6th President of Finland; a German doctor from the Peking Legation; an English explorer named Christopher Irving; R.F. Johnson, a British diplomat from the Colonial Service; and Henri D'Ollone, the French army major and viscount. The Dalai Lama was mounting a campaign to strengthen his international ties and free his kingdom from Chinese rule.

In June 1908, C.G.E. Mannerheim met Thubten Gyatso in Wutai Shan during the course of his expedition from Turkestan to Peking. Mannerheim wrote his diary and notes in Swedish to conceal the fact that his ethnographic and scientific party was also an elaborate intelligence gathering mission for the Imperial Russian army. The 13th Dalai Lama gave a blessing of white silk for the Russian Emperor. Worried about his safety, Mannerheim gave Tibet's spiritual pontiff a Browning revolver and showed him how to reload the weapon.

"Obviously," the 14th Dalai Lama said, "The 13th Dalai Lama had a keen desire to establish relations with Russia, and I also think he was a little sceptical toward England at first. Then there was Dorjiev. To the English he was a spy, but in reality he was a good scholar and a sincere Buddhist monk who had great devotion to the 13th Dalai Lama."

In September 1908, the Dalai Lama was granted an audience with the Guangxu Emperor and Empress Dowager Cixi. The emperor tried to stress Tibet's subservient role, although the Dalai Lama refused to kowtow to him. He stayed in Beijing until the end of 1908; during such time, both the Guangxu Emperor and the Empress Dowager died and were succeeded by the Xuantong Emperor, with Prince Chun as regent.

When he returned to Tibet in December 1908, he began reorganising the government, but the Qing sent a military expedition of its own to Tibet in 1910 and he had to flee to India.

== Assumption of political power ==
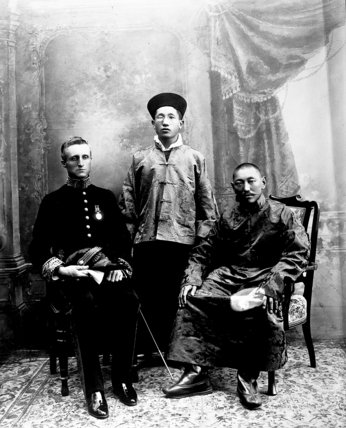
The 13th Dalai Lama of Tibet, British Political Officer Charles Bell (both seated), and Sidkeong Tulku Namgyal of Sikkim in 1910.

In 1895, Thubten Gyatso assumed ruling power from the monasteries which had previously wielded great influence through the Regent. Due to his two periods of exile in 1904–1909, first during the British expedition, and from 1910 to 1913 fleeing a Chinese invasion, he became well aware of the complexities of international politics and was the first Dalai Lama to become aware of the importance of foreign relations. The Dalai Lama, "accompanied by six ministers and a small escort" which included his close aide, diplomat and military figure Tsarong Dzasa, fled via Jelep La to Sikkim and Darjeeling, where they stayed almost two years. During this period he was invited to Calcutta by the Viceroy, Lord Minto, which helped restore relations with the British.

In 1911, revolution arose against imperial authorities, first in Wuchang and then in all of China, culminating in the abdication of the Xuantong Emperor, the abolition of the monarchy and the establishment of the Republic of China in 1912. As chaos unfolded in the mainland, Chinese forces were expelled by Tibet by local nationalists, who proclaimed Tibet to be an independent country on 4 April 1912, paving the way for the return of the Dalai Lama.

Thubten Gyatso returned to Lhasa in January 1913 with Tsarong Dzasa from Darjeeling, where he had been living in exile. The new Chinese government apologised for the actions of the previous Qing dynasty and offered to restore the Dalai Lama to his former position. He replied that he was not interested in Chinese ranks and was assuming spiritual and political leadership of Tibet.

After his return from exile in India in 1913, Thubten Gyatso assumed control of foreign relations and dealt directly with the Maharaja and the British Political officer in Sikkim and the king of Nepal rather than letting the Kashag or parliament do it.

Documents from Russian Foreign Ministry archives contain detailed argumentation of the 13th Dalai Lama that Tibet was never a part of China. Thubten Gyatso declared independence from China in early 1913 (13 February), after returning from India following three years of exile. He then standardized the Tibetan flag in its present form. At the end of 1912 the first postage stamps of Tibet and the first bank notes were issued.

Thubten Gyatso built a new medical college (Mentsikang) in 1913 on the site of the post-revolutionary traditional hospital near the Jokhang.

Legislation was introduced to counter corruption among officials, a national taxation system was established and enforced, and a police force was created. The penal system was revised and made uniform throughout the country. "Capital punishment was completely abolished and corporal punishment was reduced. Living conditions in jails were also improved, and officials were designated to see that these conditions and rules were maintained."

A secular education system was introduced in addition to the religious education system. Thubten Gyatso sent four promising students to England to study, and welcomed foreigners, including Japanese, British and American visitors.

As a result of his travels and contacts with foreign powers and their representatives (e.g., Pyotr Kozlov, Charles Alfred Bell and Gustaf Mannerheim), the Dalai Lama showed an interest in world affairs and introduced electricity, the telephone and the first motor cars to Tibet. Nonetheless, at the end of his life in 1933, he saw that Tibet was about to retreat from outside influences.

In the last decade of his life, the Dalai Lama's personal attendant, Thubten Kunphela rose to power and led several important projects for the modernization in Tibet. In 1931, a new factory complex consisting of currency mints and munition factories was established in Trapchi, with its machines driven by power from the first hydroelectric plant in Tibet. A modern army regiment was created in the same year, after the conflict broke out in Eastern Tibet.

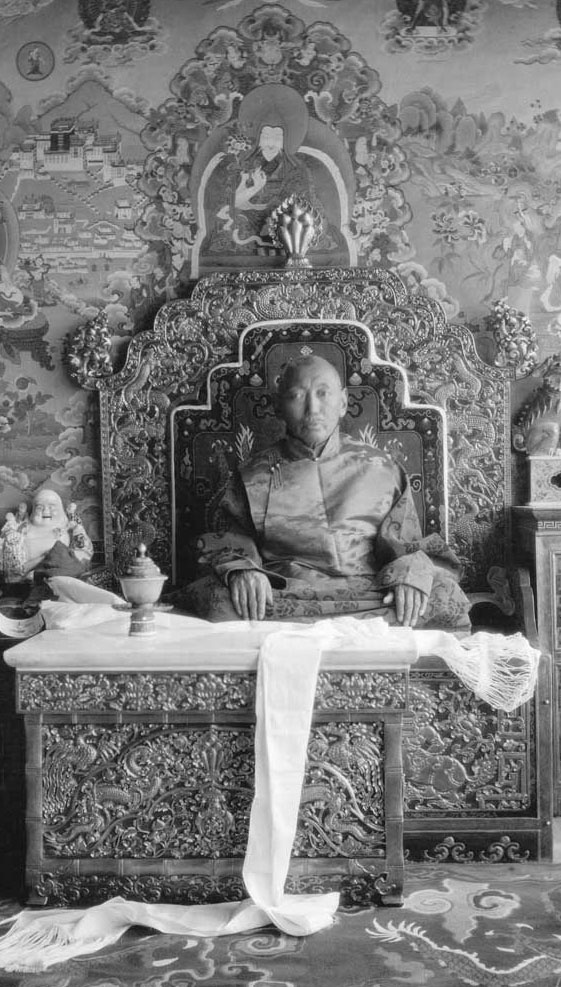
13th Dalai Lama in 1932, the year prior to his death

In 1930, Tibetan army invaded the Xikang and the Qinghai in the Sino-Tibetan War. In 1932, the Muslim Qinghai and Han-Chinese Sichuan armies of the National Revolutionary Army led by Chinese Muslim General Ma Bufang and Han General Liu Wenhui defeated the Tibetan army during the subsequent Qinghai–Tibet War. Ma Bufang overran the Tibetan armies and recaptured several counties in Xikang province. Shiqu, Dengke, and other counties were seized from the Tibetans. The Tibetans were pushed back to the other side of the Jinsha river. Ma and Liu warned Tibetan officials not to dare cross the Jinsha river again. Ma Bufang defeated the Tibetans at Dan Chokorgon. Several Tibetan generals surrendered, and were demoted by the Dalai Lama. By August, the Tibetans lost so much land to Liu Wenhui and Ma Bufang's forces that the Dalai Lama telegraphed the British authorities in India for assistance. British diplomatic pressure led to Nanjing declaring a ceasefire. Separate truces were signed by Ma and Liu with the Tibetans in 1933, ending the fighting.

== Prophecies and death ==
The 13th Dalai Lama predicted before dying:

"Very soon in this land (with a harmonious blend of religion and politics) deceptive acts may occur from without and within. At that time, if we do not dare to protect our territory, our spiritual personalities including the Victorious Father and Son (Dalai Lama and Panchen Lama) may be exterminated without trace, the property and authority of our Lhakhang's (residences of reincarnated lamas) and monks may be taken away. Moreover, our political system, developed by the Three Great Dharma Kings (Tri Songtsen Gampo, Tri Songdetsen and Tri Ralpachen) will vanish without anything remaining. The property of all people, high and low, will be seized and the people forced to become slaves. All living beings will have to endure endless days of suffering and will be stricken with fear. Such a time will come."

Buddhist titles
Preceded by Trinley Gyatso	Dalai Lama; 1879–1933; Recognized in 1878	Succeeded by Tenzin Gyatso
