= 29-Article Ordinance for the More Effective Governing of Tibet =

Tibetan imperial decree of 1793

- Traditional Chinese: 欽定藏內善後章程二十九條
- Simplified Chinese: 钦定藏内善後章程二十九条
Transcriptions
Standard Mandarin
- Hanyu Pinyin: Qīndìng Zàng nèi shànhòu zhāngchéng èrshíjiǔ tiáo

The 29-Article Ordinance for the More Effective Governing of Tibet (Chinese: 欽定藏內善後章程二十九條), also called twenty-nine-article Imperial Ordinance, was an imperial decree concerning the governance of Tibet that was supposedly issued by the Qianlong Emperor of China's Qing dynasty in 1793.

There were three versions in the Tibetan language, and the original was not found. The corresponding text in Chinese was not listed as 29 articles, but parts and parcels of it were seen in various memorials to the throne and decrees.

In 1792, the Qianlong Emperor published The Discourse of Lama that described the history of lamas and the reincarnation system. In it he described how the Golden Urn system was invented and said it would be a more fair mechanism of selecting the Dalai Lama than choosing reincarnated lamas based on private designation, or based on one person's decision. It is also used to eliminate greedy families with multiple reincarnated rinpoches and lamas.

== See also ==
- Tibet under Qing rule
- 13-Article Ordinance for the More Effective Governing of Tibet
