= 9th Dalai Lama =

Spiritual leader of Tibet from 1810 to 1815

9th Dalai Lama, Lungtok Gyatso
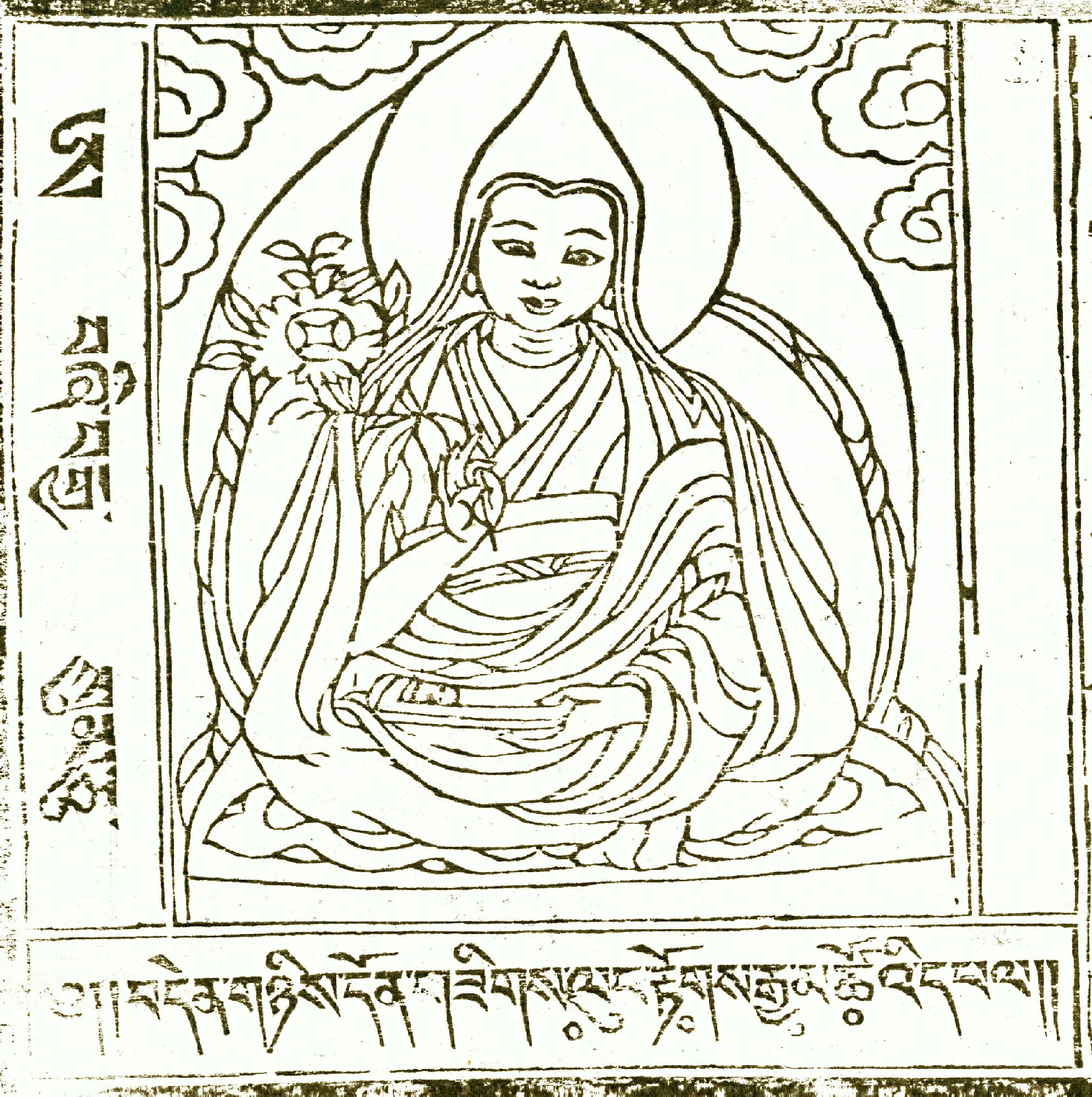
- Title: His Holiness the 9th Dalai Lama

Personal life
- Born: 1 December 1805 Dan Chokhor, Kham, Tibet
- Died: 6 March 1815 (aged 9) Ü-Tsang, Tibet
- Parents: Tenzin Chokyong (father); Dondrub Dolma (mother)

Religious life
- Religion: Tibetan Buddhism

Senior posting
- Period in office: 1810–1815
- Predecessor: 8th Dalai Lama, Jamphel Gyatso
- Successor: 10th Dalai Lama, Tsultrim Gyatso

Tibetan name
- Tibetan: ལུང་རྟོགས་རྒྱ་མཚོ་
Transcriptions
- Wylie: lung rtogs rgya mtsho

The 9th Dalai Lama (born Lungtok Gyatso; full spiritual name: Lobzang Tenpai Wangchuk Lungtok Gyatso) (Tibetan: ལུང་རྟོགས་རྒྱ་མཚོ་, Wylie: lung rtogs rgya mtsho) (1 December 1805 – 6 March 1815) was recognized as the 9th Dalai Lama of Tibet. He was the first and the youngest Dalai Lama among four successive Dalai Lamas who succumbed to illnesses before reaching 22 years of age.

== Early life ==
Under auspicious signs, Lungtok Gyatso was born near the monastery of Denchokor, on 1 December 1805. Many sources render him as an orphan, but others name his parents as Tenzin Chokyong and Dondrub Dolma. A contestant to be the next Dalai Lama since early infancy, the boy was brought to Gungtang monastery near Lhasa, where he was examined by Tibetan officials, including the Qing representatives, the ambans. He was the favored choice of the Eighth Dalai Lama's attendants. He was ultimately identified by the Seventh Panchen Lama, Gedhun Choekyi Nyima, who performed the tonsure ceremony and gave him the name Lobzang Tenpai Wangchuk Lungtok Gyatso in 1808.

== Life as Dalai Lama ==
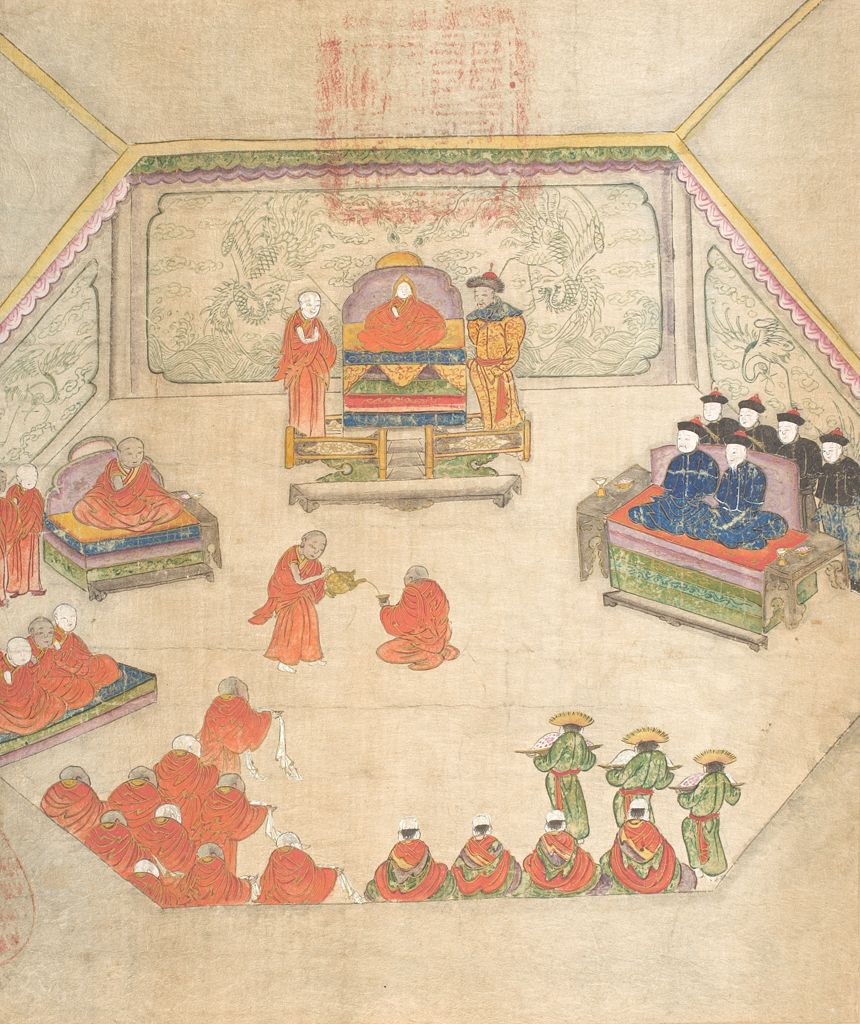
Last picture of "Finding a Dalai Lama" representing, enthronement of 9th Dalai Lama by Mongolian ambassador, Manjubazar (right to him), with ambans on the right sit.

In 1810, he was enthroned at the Potala Palace on the Golden Throne of the Ganden Phodrang Government. This same year the elderly Regent, Tatask Ngawang Gonpo died and the Demo Tulku Ngawang Lobsang Thubten Jigme Gyatso (d. 1819) was appointed to replace him.

"The English explorer Thomas Manning, who reached Lhasa in 1812, described his meeting with the 9th Dalai Lama, who was seven years old at the time, in rhapsodic terms. 'The lama's cute and interesting face engrossed all my attention,' Manning wrote. 'He had the simple, unaffected manners of a well-educated princely child. His face was, I thought, affectingly cute. He was of a happy and cheerful disposition. I was extremely affected by this interview with the lama. I could have wept through strangeness of sensation.'"

The Seventh Panchen Lama gave the boy the vows of novice monk in Lhasa in 1812, on 22 September. Lungtok Gyatso is said to have had a great interest in dharma and sharp intellect, memorizing lengthy prayer texts, root-texts of Abhisamayālaṅkāra, Mādhyamaka and Abhidharmakośa. Ngwang Nyandak (The Sixty-sixth Ganden Tripa), Jangchub Chopel (who later became the Sixty-ninth Ganden Tripa) and Yeshe Gyatso were also among his teachers.

== Death ==
The nine-year-old Dalai Lama came down with a cold at the annual Monlam Prayer Festival. He died in Tibet on 6 March 1815. "The entire nation was plunged into sorrow", which lasted until the recognition of the new reincarnation eight years later. His body was installed in a golden reliquary in the Potala Palace called Serdung Sasum Ngonga.

"During the period of the short-lived Dalai Lamas—from the Ninth to the Twelfth incarnations—the Panchen was the lama of the hour, filling the void left by the four Dalai Lamas who died in their youth."

== Sources ==
- Samten Chhosphel, "The Ninth Dalai Lama, Lungtok Gyatso" published on The Treasury of Lives, 2011."
- Brown, Mick (2010). The Dance of 17 Lives: The Incredible True Story of Tibet's 17th Karmapa. London: Bloomsbury. ISBN 978-1-58234-177-4.
- Morris, Richard Brandon; Irwin, Graham W. (1970). Harper Encyclopedia of the Modern World. Michigan: Harper & Row. ISBN 978-0-06-013072-5.
- Mullin, Glenn H. (2008). The Fourteen Dalai Lamas: A Sacred Legacy of Reincarnation. Santa Fe: Clear Light. ISBN 978-1-57416-092-5.
- Rinpoche, Khetsun Sangpo (1982). "Life and times of the Eighth to Twelfth Dalai Lamas". The Tibet Journal. VII (1 & 2 [Spring–Summer]).

Lungtok Gyatso Dalai Lama Born: 1 December 1805 Died: 6 March 1815
Buddhist titles
Preceded by Jamphel Gyatso	Dalai Lama; 1810–1815; Recognized in 1807	Succeeded by Tsultrim Gyatso
