= 10th Dalai Lama =

Spiritual leader of Tibet from 1816 to 1837

10th Dalai Lama, Tsultrim Gyatso
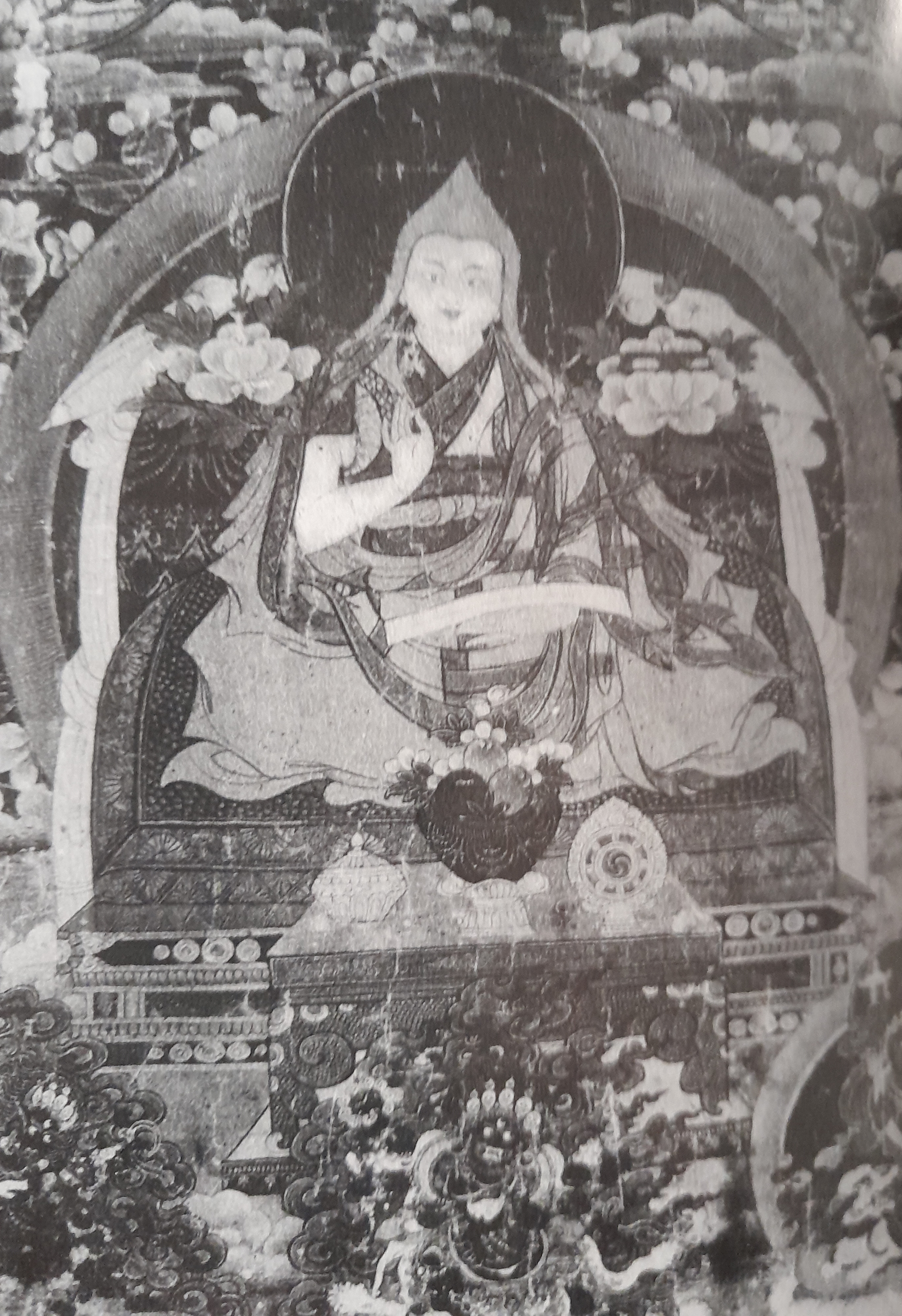
- Title: His Holiness the 10th Dalai Lama

Personal life
- Born: 25 or 26 May 1816 Lithang, Kham, Tibet
- Died: 30 September 1837 (aged 21) Lhasa, Ü-Tsang, Tibet
- Parents: Lobzang Nyendrak (father); Namgyel Butri (mother)

Religious life
- Religion: Tibetan Buddhism

Senior posting
- Period in office: 1816–1837
- Predecessor: 9th Dalai Lama, Lungtok Gyatso
- Successor: 11th Dalai Lama. Khedrup Gyatso

Tibetan name
- Tibetan: ཚུལ་ཁྲིམས་རྒྱ་མཚོ་
Transcriptions
- Wylie: tshul khrim rgya mtsho

The 10th Dalai Lama (born Tsultrim Gyatso; full spiritual name: Ngawang Lobzang Jampel Tsultrim Gyatso) (Tibetan: ཚུལ་ཁྲིམས་རྒྱ་མཚོ་, Wylie: Tshul Khrim Rgya Mtsho) (25 or 26 May 1816 – 30 September 1837) was the 10th Dalai Lama of Tibet, and born in Litang, Kham. He was fully ordained in the Gelug school of Tibetan Buddhism, studied the sutras and tantras, had several students, and rebuilt the Potala Palace.

Tsultrim Gyatso was born to a modest family known as Drongto Norbutsang (grong stod nor bu tshang) in Lithang, Kham, Tibet. His father was Lobzang Nyendrak (blo bzang snyan grags) and his mother was Namgyel Butri (rnam rgyal bu khrid). The 9th Dalai Lama Lungtok Gyatso had died in 1815, and five years passed before this incarnation was found.

Tsultrim Gyatso was chosen from a field of six potential incarnates of the 9th Dalai Lama Lungtok Gyatso. Preferred as the best by the Tibetan oracle and government officials in 1820, he travelled to Lhasa in 1821 after which the Kalon (regent) Demo Ngawang Lobzang Tubten Jigme Gyatso died. The Qing emperor's representatives (ambans) then insisted that their "golden urn" be used to confirm the incarnation, delaying the enthronement for a year.

During that year of delay, Tibetan historians state

According to Tibetan historians, Tibetan officials allowed the amban [to] announced that the Urn had been used to satisfy the Emperor, despite the reality that the Urn had not been employed. The enthronement took place on eighth day of the eighth month of the water-horse-year of the fourteenth sexagenary cycle, and was supervised by the regent.

The enthronement of the 10th Dalai Lama, Tsultrim Gyatso, was held at the Potala Palace on 23 September 1822, which is the eighth day of the eighth lunar month of the Water Horse Year.

Soon after his enthronement in 1822, the Dalai Lama received his pre-novice ordination from the Seventh Panchen Lama Lobzang Palden Tenpai Nyima and gave him the name Ngawang Lobzang Jampel Tsultrim Gyatso (ngag dbang blo bzang 'jam dpal tshul khrims rgya mtsho). The following month he became a novice monk. His father received a title and the Yutok estate, which initiated a noble Tibetan family line.

In 1825 in his 10th year, the Dalai Lama had many tutors and was enrolled at Drepung Monastery and studied both sutra and tantra. He likely studied at Ganden Monastery and Sera Monastery as well. He studied Tibetan Buddhist texts extensively during the rest of his life.

In 1830, the Dalai Lama was put in charge of the Tibetan state, and a report called the "Iron-Tiger Report" on agriculture and tax policies was prepared. In 1831 the Dalai Lama reconstructed the Potala Palace.

In 1834 the Dalai Lama gave teachings to the Fifth Kalkha and to the Mongolian King of Torgo, and sent senior monks to Mongolia to establish a Kalacakra center there.

The Dalai Lama set about to overhaul the economic structure of Tibet but did not live long enough to see his plans come to fruition. After becoming ill in 1834 during an epidemic breakout in Lhasa, the Dalai Lama received his full Gelong ordination from the Panchen Lama in his nineteenth year. He remained in poor health for three years and died in 1837.

Despite his death in his 22nd year, he was said to have had several students from Tibet and Bhutan. The 10th Dalai Lama's body was installed in a golden reliquary in the Potala Palace called The Supreme Ornament of the Three Realms” (gser gdung khams gsum rgyan mchog).

Buddhist titles
Preceded by Lungtok Gyatso	Dalai Lama; 1826–1837; Recognized in 1822	Succeeded by Khedrup Gyatso
