= Gyaincain Norbu =

11th Panchen Lama as recognized by China

Chökyi Gyalpo
- ཆོས་ཀྱི་རྒྱལ་པོ་
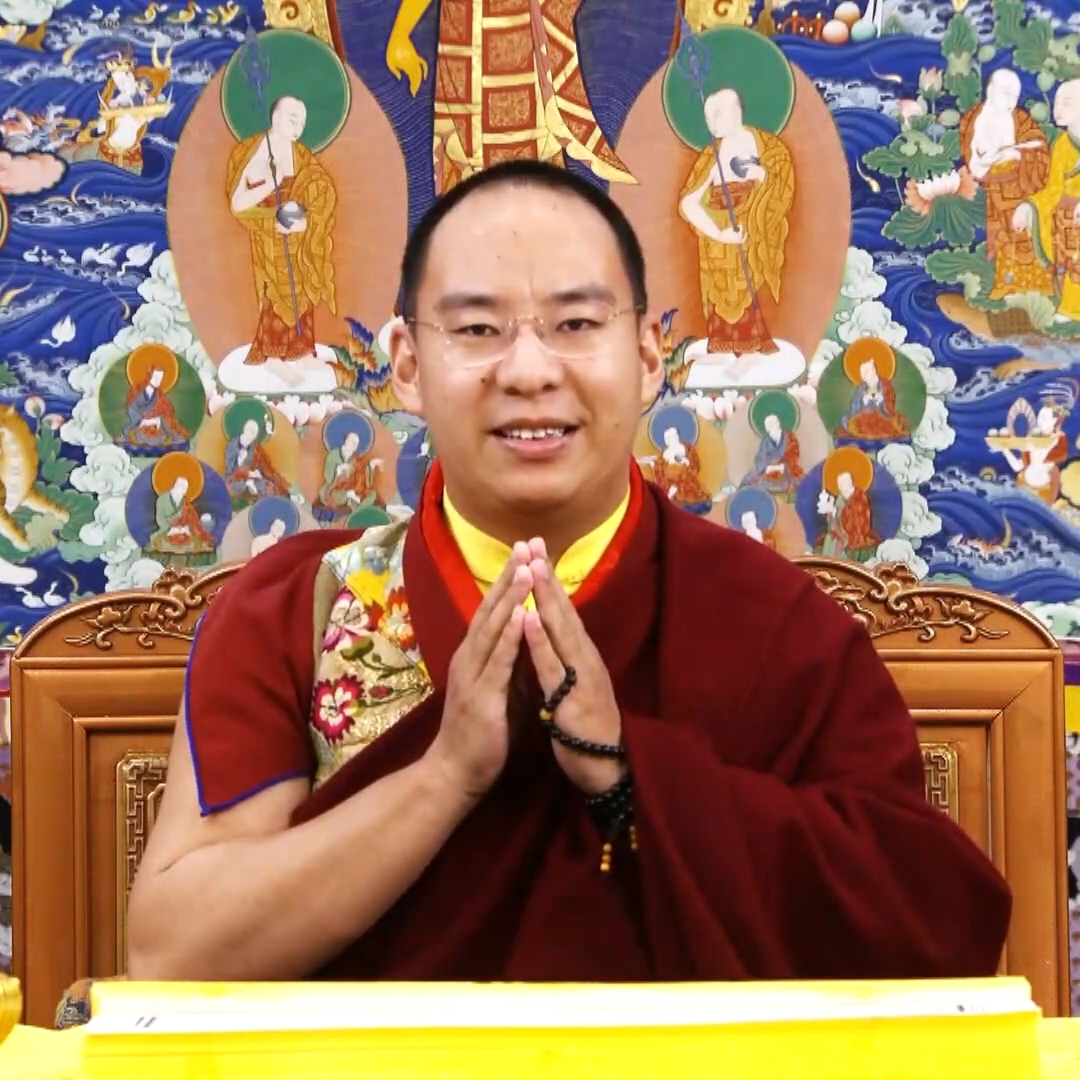
- Gyaincain Norbu in 2023

11th Panchen Lama (disputed)
- Incumbent
- Assumed office 8 December 1995; PRC interpretation, disputed by Gedhun Choekyi Nyima
- Preceded by: Choekyi Gyaltsen

Member of the National Committee of the Chinese People's Political Consultative Conference
- Incumbent
- Assumed office March 2008
- Chairman: Jia Qinglin; Yu Zhengsheng; Wang Yang; Wang Huning

Personal details
- Born: Gyaincain Norbu; 13 February 1990 (age 36) Lhari County, Nagqu, Tibet Autonomous Region, China
- Parents: Sonam Drakpa (father); Sangkyi Dolma (mother)

Chökyi Gyalpo, also referred to by his secular name Gyaincain Norbu or Gyaltsen Norbu (born 13 February 1990), is considered the 11th Panchen Lama by the People's Republic of China (PRC). He is also the vice president of the Buddhist Association of China, an organization managed by the United Front Work Department of the Central Committee of the Chinese Communist Party. Gyalpo is considered by critics to be a proxy of the Chinese government.

Gyalpo's position as Panchen Lama is disputed by the earlier recognition of Gedhun Choekyi Nyima, by the 14th Dalai Lama. Gedhun Choekyi Nyima, along with his family and Chadrel Rinpoche, the then-incumbent Khenpo of Tashi Lhunpo Monastery, were kidnapped and/or arrested then detained in one or more unknown locations by the Chinese government in the days following the Dalai Lama's official recognition of Gedhun Choekyi Nyima. The Tibetan administration in exile (Central Tibetan Administration) does not recognize the Chinese government's selection using the Golden Urn, but some monks in Chinese-controlled Tibetan monasteries do refer to the Chinese government's selection as the Panchen Lama.

== Names ==
- Gyaincain Norbu

Tibetan name
- Tibetan: ཆོས་ཀྱི་རྒྱལ་པོ་
Transcriptions
- Wylie: Chos-kyi Rgyal-po
- Tibetan Pinyin: Qögyi'gyäbo
- Lhasa IPA: bo

Chinese name
- Traditional Chinese: 確吉傑布
- Simplified Chinese: 确吉杰布
Transcriptions
Standard Mandarin
- Hanyu Pinyin: Quèjí Jiébù

Gyaincain Norbu's full religious name is Jêzün Lobsang Qamba Lhünzhub Qögyi'gyäbo Bäsangbo, although he is generally called Qoigyijabu (Tibetan: ཆོས་ཀྱི་རྒྱལ་པོ་་, Wylie: Chos-kyi Rgyal-po, ZWPY: Qögyi Gyäbo). Meaning "Dharma king", this name can also be written Qögyi'gyäbo, Qögyi Gyäbo, Qoigyi'gyaibo, Qoigyi Gyaibo, Chökyi Gyalpo, Choekyi Gyalpo, or, in Wylie transliteration, Chos-kyi rGyal-po. The Chinese equivalent is Quèjí Jiébù (确吉杰布).

The secular name, Gyaincain Norbu (Tibetan: རྒྱལ་མཚན་ནོར་བུ་, Wylie: Rgyal-mtshan Nor-bu, ZWPY: Gyäncän Norbu), can also be written Gyaencaen Norbu, Gyancain Norbu, or Gyaltsen Norbu.

== Biography ==
Gyaincain Norbu was born on 13 February 1990 in Lhari County in northern Tibet Autonomous Region. He had been living in Beijing during his early childhood to be educated in a Chinese way, and travelled to Tashilhunpo Monastery for his enthronement in November/December 1995, in Shigatse, the official seat of the Panchen Lamas. Since his selection by the Chinese government as the Panchen Lama he has studied Tibetan Buddhism; to his studies he added Tibetan language, sutra, and logic at ten, and he is bilingual in both Tibetan and Chinese. He spent most of his later childhood studying Buddhism in Beijing. In a rare appearance for his adolescent age, Norbu delivered a speech in Tibetan for the opening ceremony of the 2006 World Buddhist Forum about Buddhism and national unity. One Western press outlet reported a cold reception among delegates, with fellow Buddhists making no attempt to greet Gyaltsen Norbu during greeting ceremonies ahead of the conference on Wednesday. Tenzin Gyatso, the 14th Dalai Lama had not been invited, because he is viewed by China as "a long-time stubborn secessionist who has tried to split his Chinese motherland and break the unity among different ethnic groups."

Two years later, in 2008, he denounced anti-Han riots in Lhasa, saying "We resolutely oppose all activities to split the country and undermine ethnic unity". China sees him as "the public face of Tibetan Buddhism".

On 3 February 2010, Norbu was elected vice president of the Buddhist Association of China. Later that month, at 20 years old, Norbu became the youngest member of the advisory body National Committee of the Chinese People's Political Consultative Conference (CPPCC). Vice chairman of the Tibet Autonomous Region Hao Peng praised his appointment, in particular for Norbu's "demonstrating the role of the living Buddhas in Tibetan Buddhism and encouraging more believers to participate in state affairs". He was not, however, made vice chairman of the CPPCC, as Choekyi Gyaltsen, 10th Panchen Lama was and was widely expected of Norbu. Still, the Tibetan government in exile expressed concern that his appointment could prejudice his position on the next Dalai Lama, who normally requires approval from the Panchen Lama.

In May 2010, he reported to the ethnically Tibetan earthquake zone of the 2010 Yushu earthquake and held prayer services for victims. In June, he gave speeches at Tibet University and Tibet University of Traditional Tibetan Medicine in Lhasa promoting the value of education. In response to the 2010 Gansu mudslide, in which Zhugqu County, a third of which is populated by Tibetans, was hit, he donated ¥50,000 to relief efforts and prayed for the victims. He pays visits to the Tashilhunpo Monastery, the traditional seat of the Panchen Lama, although he does not live there. The Asia Times describes him as "A slight man who wears thick glasses and traditional crimson robes".

On 26 April 2012, Gyaincain made his first appearance outside of mainland China, in Hong Kong, to address over a thousand monks at the Third World Buddhist Forum on the topic of Dharma.

=== Selection ===
Following the death of the Choekyi Gyaltsen, 10th Panchen Lama in 1989, both the Tibetan government in exile and the Chinese government started parallel processes in the six-year-long search for the 11th Panchen Lama.

The head of the Chinese government's Panchen Lama search committee at the time, Chadrel Rinpoche, was able to secretly communicate with the Dalai Lama. He planned to submit the Dalai Lama's favored choice to the government. When the government learned of this, they arrested Chadrel in May 1995. The Dalai Lama moved to pre-empt China's choice, and proclaimed his own preferred candidate, Gedhun Choekyi Nyima, as the 11th incarnation of the Panchen Lama. Four days later, Chinese security forces escorted him from his home in Lhari County, stating that he "was at risk of being kidnapped by Tibetan separatists". China rejects Nyima as being "arbitrarily" chosen, while the Tibetan government in exile similarly insists on its candidate's legitimacy.

Chadrel was replaced on the search committee by Sengchen Lobsang Gyaltsen. The new committee decided to choose the Panchen Lama from a list of finalists by drawing lots from a Golden Urn. The Chinese custom of using the Golden Urn had been introduced in the year 1792 by the Qianlong Emperor and used to select the 10th, 11th, and 12th Dalai Lamas. Four days before his death, the China Tibet Information Center reports, the 10th Panchen Lama requested that the Golden Urn process be used to select his successor.

Six-year-old Gyaincain Norbu was selected on 8 December 1995 with the religious name Qoigyijabu. Exiled Tibetan abbot Arjia Rinpoche alleges that Ye Xiaowen, the central government official in charge of the Panchen Lama issue, stated privately that the selection had been rigged in favor of Gyaincain Norbu. Gyaincain Norbu was enthroned at Tashilhunpo Monastery and has since assumed the full functions of Panchen Lama. In attendance at the enthronement was the 8th Arjia Rinpoche, who in his book says, "We had to prostrate to the so-called Panchen Lama...we had neither the respect for nor faith in this chosen child... I felt soiled by this gesture."

== Diplomatic meetings ==
On 14 September 2010, the foreign minister of Singapore, George Yeo, became the first foreign member of government to meet officially with Gyaincain Norbu, at the Xihuang Monastery in Beijing.

== See also ==
- Golden Urn
- 29-Article Ordinance for the More Effective Governing of Tibet

Buddhist titles
Preceded by Choekyi Gyaltsen	Reincarnation of the Panchen Lama; 1995–present	Incumbent
