= Lhari =

Lhari may refer to:

- Lhari County, county in Tibet
- Lhari Town, town in Tibet
- Lhari stream and Lhari peak, at the border of Ladakh and Tibet
