= Lhade Namloyak =

Chinese writer and academic (born 1970)

- ལྷ་སྡེ་གནམ་ལོ་ཡག
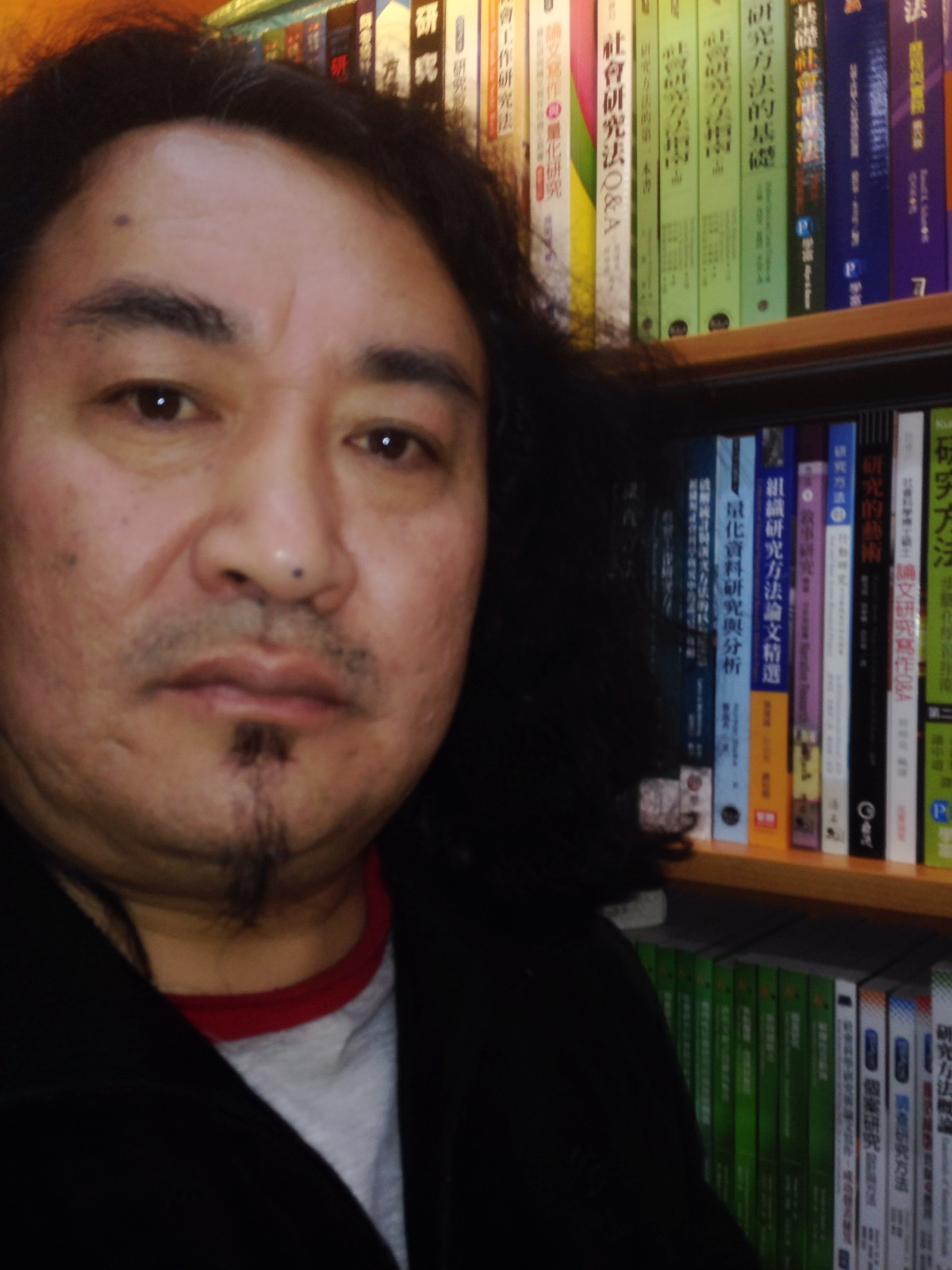
- Lhade Namloyak
- Born: 1970 (age 55–56); Xinghai County, Qinghai, China
- Citizenship: Australia
- Education: Qinghai Normal University
- Occupation: Polyglot Writer
- Writing career
- Pen name: Dongsai(Namloyak Dhungser)
- Language: Tibetan, Chinese, English
- Period: 1989-1992
- Genre: Poem
- Notable work: Poetry And Prison

Lhade Namloyak (Tibetan: ལྷ་སྡེ་གནམ་ལོ་ཡག, Wylie: Lha-sde Gnam-lo-yag/Namloyak Dhungser; simplified Chinese: 安乐业; traditional Chinese: 安樂業; pinyin: Ān Lèyè;;1970) is a Tibetan-Australian Polyglot Writer.

== Biography ==
Lhade Namloyak was born in Tangnaigai Township of Xinghai County, Qinghai in 1970, during the Cultural Revolution. He attended Xinghai County Minzu Middle School. In 1989 he was accepted to Qinghai Normal University and graduated in 1992. After graduation, he was assigned to the Bureau of Education of Xinghai County. He started to publish works in 1989. On May 9, 1993, he was arrested by the National Security Agency. He was sentenced to four years imprisonment for the crime of splitting the state. On November 14, 1997, he was released from prison. In March 1999 he was in exile in India.

From May 1, 1999 to March 31, 2005, Lhade Namloyak worked in the Central Tibetan Administration as a researcher. On May 14, 2007, he pursued advanced studies in Australia.

In October 2013, Lhade Namloyak published a book with Yuan Hongbing in Taipei, Taiwan on the death of the 10th Panchen Lama. The book claims Panchen was murdered by the Chinese Communist Party. It alleges that Deng Xiaoping and other senior members of the Communist Party, took the decision to murder by poisoning the 10th Panchen Lama, and under the leadership of Hu Jintao and Wen Jiabao, the implementation of Meng Hongwei, Hu Chunhua and Zhou Meizhen.

== Works ==
- Poetry And Prison (Chinese: 诗囚集)
- Nights of Snow on fire (Chinese: 雪被燃烧的夜晚)
- Truth for Promotion of Peaceful Talks—Follow-up Recording of the 3rd China Trip of Special Envoy of Dalai Lama (Chinese: 真相促和谈：追踪记录达赖喇嘛特使第三度中国行)
- Review of Tibetan's Opinions (Chinese: 人主张一瞥)
- The Poetry in Name of Tibet(Collective Tibetan translation) (Chinese: 名为西藏的诗)
- Research for Sangdhor (Chinese: 桑多研究)
- An in-depth perspective of Tibetan self-immolation-The origin and development of Tibetan self-immolation protest movement (Chinese: 深度透视藏人自焚：图伯特焚身抗议运动的来龙去脉)
- Assassination of the Buddha——The Truth of the Death of His Holiness the 10th Panchen Lama (Co-author: Yuan Hongbing) (Chinese: 杀佛：十世班禅大师蒙难真相)
- An Introduction to History of International Tibetology (Chinese: 国际藏学史导论)
- TIBET Restoring State VS Colonial 'Autonomic (Chinese: 西藏 复国VS 亡国)(1951-2021) October of 2021 in Taiwan
- Aflame for Freedom in Tibet: The Origin and Development of the Self-Immolation Movement (English), (co-translator/editor Dr. Joshua Esler), Lexington Books, 2024
- "The Truth Behind the Assassination of Tenzin Delek Rinpoche," narrated by Nyima Lhamo. (Translation into Chinese) Dharamshala, 2025
- "A Lazy Boy and His Magical Fingers". (Children's picture book in English) Sheridan Institute of Higher Education Press, 2025
