= Nagqu (disambiguation) =

Nagqu is a prefecture-level city in Tibet.

Nagqu may also refer to:

- Seni District, district in Tibet, formerly Nagqu County
- Nagqu Town, town in Nagchu County

== See also ==
- Nagu, a former municipality and parish of Finland
- Nagua, the capital of María Trinidad Sánchez province in the Dominican Republic
