= Lingti =

- Township
- Location within Tibet Autonomous Region
- Coordinates: 30°56′44″N 92°33′12″E
- Country: China
- Region: Tibet Autonomous Region
- Prefecture: Nagqu Prefecture
- County: Lhari County

Population (2004)
  - Total: 1,100
  - Major Nationalities: Tibetan
  - Regional dialect: Tibetan language
- Time zone: +8

Lingti, also Lindi or Lindixiang (Chinese: 林堤乡) is a small town and township-level division of Lhari County in the Nagqu Prefecture of the Tibet Autonomous Region, in China. It lies along the S305 road, 105 kilometres (65 mi) northwest of Lhari Town and 100 kilometres (62 mi) southwest by road of Nagchu Town. As of 2004 it had a population of about 1100. The principal economic activity is animal husbandry, pastoral yak, goat, sheep, and so on. The town's name means "forest embankment".

== Administrative divisions ==
The township-level division contains the following villages:

- Lindi Village (林堤村)
- Qiacha Village (恰查村)
- Wosuo Village (沃索村)
- Jiangjiu Village (江久村)
- Palongba Village (帕隆巴村)
- Yangre Village (央热村)
- Cangkang Village (仓康村)

== See also ==
- List of towns and villages in Tibet
