= Xarma =

- Township
- Location within Tibet Autonomous Region
- Coordinates: 30°47′42″N 92°40′40″E
- Country: China
- Region: Tibet Autonomous Region
- Prefecture: Nagqu Prefecture
- County: Lhari County

Population (2004)
  - Total: 1,700
  - Major Nationalities: Tibetan
  - Regional dialect: Tibetan language
- Time zone: +8

Xarma, also Sharma, Xiama or Xiamaxiang (Chinese: 夏玛乡) is a small town and township-level division of Lhari County in the Nagqu Prefecture of the Tibet Autonomous Region, in China. It lies along the S305 road, 69.4 kilometres (43.1 mi) northwest of Lhari Town and 136 kilometres (85 mi) southwest by road of Nagchu Town. As of 2004 it had a population of about 1700. The principal economic activity is animal husbandry, pastoral yak, goat, sheep, and so on.

== Administrative divisions ==
The township-level division contains the following villages:

- Po'ercang Village (坡尔仓村)
- Gongxi Village (贡西村)
- Langqing Village (朗庆村)
- Azhaiku Village (阿寨库村)
- Mentangku Village (门塘库村)
- Chuiqian Village (垂铅村)
- Jiaren Village (甲仁村)
- Takong Village (塔孔村)
- Jiagei Village (甲给村)
- Chuiqiong Village (垂琼村)
- Duola Village (多拉村)
- Naicang Village (乃仓村)
- Xiama Village (夏玛村 )

== See also ==
- List of towns and villages in Tibet
