= Gedhun Choekyi Nyima =

11th Panchen Lama as recognized by the 14th Dalai Lama

Gedhun Choekyi Nyima དགེ་འདུན་ཆོས་ཀྱི་ཉི་མ་
- Only circulated image, taken in 1995

11th Panchen Lama (disputed)
- Reign: 14 May 1995–present (CTA interpretation, disputed by Chinese Communist Party proxy Gyaincain Norbu)
- Predecessor: Choekyi Gyaltsen 10th Panchen Lama
- Born: 25 April 1989 (age 37); Lhari County, Tibet Autonomous Region, China
- Disappeared: 17 May 1995 (aged 6); Lhari County, Tibet Autonomous Region, China
- Status: Missing for 31 years, 4 months and 4 days

- Gedhun Choekyi Nyima

Tibetan name
- Tibetan: དགེ་འདུན་ཆོས་ཀྱི་ཉི་མ
Transcriptions
- Wylie: dge 'dun chos kyi nyi ma
- Tibetan Pinyin: Gêndün Qoigyi Nyima
- Lhasa IPA: Tibetan pronunciation: [ɡendỹ tɕʰøci ɲima]

Chinese name
- Traditional Chinese: 更登確吉尼瑪
- Simplified Chinese: 更登确吉尼玛
Transcriptions
Standard Mandarin
- Hanyu Pinyin: Gèngdēng Quèjí Nímǎ

Gedhun Choekyi Nyima (born 25 April 1989) is the 11th Panchen Lama belonging to the Gelugpa school of Tibetan Buddhism, as recognized and announced by the 14th Dalai Lama on 14 May 1995. Three days later, on 17 May, the six-year-old Panchen Lama was kidnapped and forcibly disappeared by the Chinese Communist Party (CCP), after the Chinese government failed in its efforts to install a substitute. A Chinese substitute is seen as a political tool to undermine the reincarnation of the Dalai Lama, which traditionally is recognized by the Panchen Lama. Gedhun Choekyi Nyima remains forcibly detained by the CCP, along with his family, in an undisclosed location since 1995. His khenpo, Chadrel Rinpoche, and another Gelugpa monk, Jampa Chungla, were also arrested. The United Nations, with the support of numerous states, organizations, and private individuals continue to call for the 11th Panchen Lama's release.

The Panchen Lama was born in Lhari County, Tibet Autonomous Region, from where he was kidnapped under the authority of the People's Republic of China. He has been called the world's youngest political prisoner. Since his recognition as the 11th Panchen Lama, he continues to be forcibly detained, along with his family, by the Chinese government, and has not been seen in public since 17 May 1995.

In a response to growing international pressure from the United Nations, governments of various states, and in 2020 from 159 independent organizations from 18 countries working with the United Nations, on 19 May 2020, the Chinese government alleged that the Panchen Lama is "now a college graduate with a stable job", but has not provided supporting evidence.

The Chinese government continues to refuse the Panchen Lama's and his family's release, or allow them to meet with observers.

== Selection of the 11th Panchen Lama ==
Four days before his death, the 10th Panchen Lama made his own will publicly to follow the tradition. On 24 January, following the opening ceremony of the Ling Pagoda, with religious figures in Tibet, Qinghai, Gansu, Sichuan and Yunnan provinces and autonomous regions, the 10th Panchen Lama held a special talk on the reincarnation of the Living Buddha, proposing that "the three candidate boys should be identified first and then investigated one by one" and "I would like to take the lead by drawing lots of Golden Urn before the image of Sakyamuni."

Following the death of the 10th Panchen Lama in 1989, the search for an individual to be recognised as his reincarnation by Tibetan Buddhists quickly became mired in mystery and controversy, as Tibet had been under the occupation and control of the anti-religious government of the People's Republic of China since 1959.

Three days after the death of the 10th Panchen Lama, the Premier of the State Council published its decision on how the 11th Panchen Lama was to be selected, claiming to have taken advice from the committee of Tashi Lhunpo Monastery and monks.

Armed with Beijing's approval, the head of the Panchen Lama search committee, Chadrel Rinpoche, maintained private communication with the Dalai Lama in order to arrive at a mutually acceptable candidate for both the Dalai Lama and Beijing authorities concerning the Panchen Lama's reincarnation. After the Dalai Lama named Gedhun Choekyi Nyima as the 11th incarnation of the Panchen Lama on 14 May 1995, Chinese authorities had Chadrel Rinpoche arrested and charged with treason and leaking state secrets. According to the Tibetan Government in Exile, he was replaced by Sengchen Lobsang Gyaltsen, so chosen because he was more likely to agree with the party line. Sengchen had been a political opponent of both the Dalai Lama and the 10th Panchen Lama. Because of the history of rivalry between different sects of Tibetan Buddhism, many Tibetans and scholars believe that this was a tactical move by the Chinese Communist Party (CCP) to create more unrest and disunity between the typically unified Tibetan peoples.

The new search committee ignored the Dalai Lama's 14 May announcement and instead chose from a list of finalists which excluded Gedhun Choekyi Nyima. In selecting a name, lottery numbers were drawn from a Golden Urn, a procedure used in Tibet by the Chinese (Manchu) emperor in 1793. The 14th Dalai Lama stated that the Tibetan method involves using possessions of the former Lama to identify his reincarnation, as the new child incarnate will reportedly recognize his past items amid miscellaneous ones.

The BBC reported that the CCP's choice of Gyaincain Norbu was rejected by most Tibetans. Alexander Norman wrote, "Today, the Panchen Lamas are famous for having two claimants to the see of Tashilhunpo: one recognised by the present Dalai Lama and taken into house arrest by the Chinese, the other recognised by China but by no one else."

== Whereabouts ==
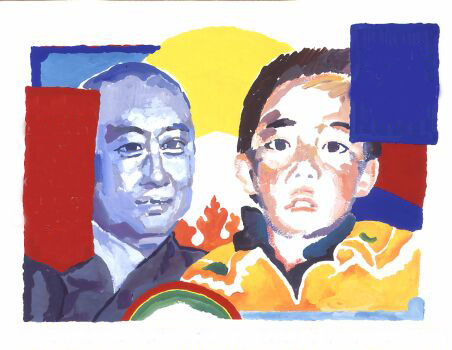
Depiction of Choekyi Gyaltsen (left) and Gedhun Choekyi Nyima (right) by Claude-Max Lochu in 2008

Since his kidnapping, the whereabouts of Gedhun Choekyi Nyima have been unknown. Chinese officials state that his whereabouts are kept undisclosed to protect him. Human rights organizations termed him the "youngest political prisoner in the world". No foreign party has been allowed to visit him.

The United Nations Committee on the Rights of the Child requested to be told of Nyima's whereabouts on 28 May 1996. Xinhua declined, responding that Gedhun Choekyi Nyima was at risk of being "kidnapped by separatists" and that "his security had been threatened". The Committee requested a visit with Gedhun Choekyi Nyima, supported by a campaign of more than 400 celebrities and associations petitioning for the visit, including six Nobel Prize winners. According to statements by the Chinese government from 1998, he was then leading a normal life.

In May 2007, Asma Jahangir, Special Rapporteur on Freedom of Religion or Belief of the UN Human Rights Council, asked the Chinese authorities what measures they had taken to implement the recommendation of the UN Committee on the Rights of the Child, that the government should allow an independent expert to visit and confirm the well-being of Gedhun Choekyi Nyima while respecting his right to privacy, and that of his parents. In a response dated 17 July 2007, Chinese authorities said, "Gedhun Choekyi Nyima is a perfectly ordinary Tibetan boy, in an excellent state of health, leading a normal, happy life and receiving a good education and cultural upbringing. He is currently in upper secondary school, he measures 165 cm [5 ft 5 in] in height and is easy-going by nature. He studies hard and his school results are very good. He likes traditional Chinese culture and has recently taken up calligraphy. His parents are both State employees, and his brothers and sisters are either already working or at university. The allegation that he disappeared together with his parents and that his whereabouts remain unknown is simply not true." This response did not answer the question about a visit or confirmation.

In 2015, on the twentieth anniversary of Gendun Choekyi Nyima's disappearance, Chinese officials announced "The reincarnated child Panchen Lama you mentioned is being educated, living a normal life, growing up healthily and does not wish to be disturbed."

In April 2018, the Dalai Lama declared that he knew from a "reliable source" that the Panchen Lama he had recognized, Gedhun Choekyi Nyima, was alive and receiving normal education. He said he hoped that the PRC-appointed Panchen Lama Gyaincain Norbu studied well under the guidance of a good teacher. As of 2026, Gedhun Choekyi Nyima has not been seen by any independent observer since his disappearance in 1995.

The UN Working Group on Enforced or Involuntary Disappearances considers the alleged kidnapping and detention of Nyima and his family to constitute an enforced disappearance, and as of 25 June 2024 continues to call for prompt and public release of the truth of Nyima's fate or whereabouts. An enforced disappearance, as defined by treaty and by customary international law, occurs when a person is arrested, detained, abducted, or otherwise deprived of liberty by State agents or people acting with State authorization, support or acquiescence, "followed by a refusal to acknowledge the deprivation of liberty or by concealment of the fate or whereabouts of the disappeared person, which place such a person outside the protection of the law". Enforced disappearance, as opposed to most domestic definitions of kidnapping, is a continuing crime which persists for "as long as perpetrators continue to conceal the fate and whereabouts of persons who have disappeared."

He was awarded the Democracy Service Medal by the National Endowment for Democracy in 2025.

== See also ==
- Golden Urn
- 29-Article Ordinance for the More Effective Governing of Tibet
- List of people who disappeared

Gedhun Choekyi Nyima Panchen Lama Born: 1989 April 25
Buddhist titles
Preceded by Choekyi Gyaltsen	Reincarnation of the Panchen Lama (Government of Tibet in Exile interpretation); 1995–present	Incumbent
