= Xiguan Airport =

Xiguan Airport may refer to the following airports in China:

- Xi'an Xiguan Airport, former airport serving Xi'an, Shaanxi
- Hanzhong Xiguan Airport, former airport serving Hanzhong, Shaanxi
- Fuyang Xiguan Airport, airport serving Fuyang, Anhui
