= Jiali =

Jiali may refer to the following places in mainland China or Taiwan:

- Jiali, Tainan (佳里區), district in Taiwan
- Lhari County (嘉黎县, in pinyin Jiālí Xiàn), county of Nagqu Prefecture, Tibet
