= Nagqu Dagring Airport =

Planned airport in Nagqu, Tibet, China

Coordinates: 29.3516°N 89.2992°E

Nagqu Dagring Airport (Chinese: 那曲达仁机场; pinyin: Nǎqū Dárén Jīchǎng) is a planned airport that will serve Seni in the Nagqu of Tibet. If built it will be the highest airport in the world at 4,436 m (14,554 ft), surpassing Daocheng Yading Airport as the highest. The airport is part of a Chinese government development scheme to build 97 airports across China by 2020. By then, the authorities intend that four-fifths of China's population will be within a 90-minute drive of an airport.

In 2015 it was announced that construction of the airport has been delayed due to the necessity to develop higher technological standards on very high altitude buildings (China has the world's four highest airports).
