= Codoi Township, Lhari County =

Codoi
- Township
- Location within Tibet Autonomous Region
- Coordinates: 30°28′N 92°30′E
- Country: China
- Region: Tibet Autonomous Region
- Prefecture: Lhasa Prefecture
- County: Lhünzhub County

Area
  - Total: 162 km^{2} (63 sq mi)

Population (2004)
  - Total: 5,000
  - Major Nationalities: Tibetan
  - Regional dialect: Tibetan language
- Time zone: +8

Codoi (Chinese: 措多乡) is a small town and township in Lhari County in Nagqu Prefecture of the Tibet Autonomous Region, in China. It had a population of about 16,000 as of 2004.

== Administrative divisions ==
The township contains the following villages:

- Rexu Village (热须村)
- Zhana Village (扎纳村)
- Longzhujiao Village (弄竹角村)
- Nimalong Village (尼玛隆村)
- Gangga Zhujiao Village (岗嘎竹角村)
- Duoqiwu Village (多奇吾村)
- Zamu Labu Village (杂姆拉布村)
- Leyangqia Village (勒央恰村)
- Saruduo Village (洒如朵村)
- Cuoguo Village (错果村)
- Nabu Village (那布村)
- Gadang Village (嘎当村)
- Muchiqin Village (亩迟勤村)
- Gutang Village (古塘村)
- Zalule Village (杂鲁勒村)
