= Chadrel Rinpoche =

Tibetan lama and political prisoner

Chadrel Rinpoche or Jadrel Jampa Thinley Rinpoche
- བྱ་བྲལ་རིན་པོ་ཆེ་
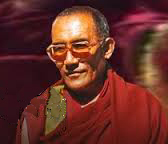
- Chadrel Rinpoche

Member of the 7th, 8th Chinese People's Political Consultative Conference
- In office April 1988 – 14 June 1996
- Chairman: Li Xiannian; Li Ruihuan

Personal details
- Born: 1939 (age 86–87) Shigatse, Tibet
- Disappeared: 14 May 1995 (age 54–55); Hanzhong Xiguan Airport, Chenggu, China
- Status: Missing for 31 years, 1 month and 24 days

Chadrel Rinpoche (Tibetan: བྱ་བྲལ་རིན་པོ་ཆེ་, Wylie: bya bral rin po che) was born in 1939 in Shigatse, Tibet. He was also known formally as Jadrel Jampa Thinley Rinpoche (Tibetan: བྱམས་པ་ཕྲིན་ལས་, Wylie: byams pa phrin las), and was a Gelug school Rinpoche of Tibetan Buddhism. In 1954, he joined the Tashilhunpo Monastery at the age of 15, and was forced to work in a labor camp during the Cultural Revolution in Tibet. He was a close student of Choekyi Gyaltsen, the 10th Panchen Lama. Later Chadrel Rinpoche became the head Khenpo of the Tashilhunpo Monastery. In 1989, Chadrel Rinpoche was appointed to lead the Chinese efforts to locate the reincarnated 11th Panchen Lama. In February 1995 while in Beijing, he refused plans to substitute the reincarnate Gedhun Choekyi Nyima with another boy. As a result, he was arrested after Gedhun Choekyi Nyima was formally recognized, then he was continually imprisoned and held under house arrest until his reported suspicious death from poisoning in 2011. He was also a Member of the 7th and 8th Chinese People's Political Consultative Conference (CPPCC).

After the death of the 10th Panchen Lama in 1989, Chadrel Rinpoche was appointed as the deputy head of the Chinese government's Panchen Lama search committee, created as an effort to control the reincarnation of lamas. Gyayag Rinpoche, was the head of the Chinese search committee but died in 1990, and Chadrel Rinpoche succeeded him. Chadrel Rinpoche was communicating with the 14th Dalai Lama and others following the authentic recognition process, which was permitted by China.

On 14 May 1995, the Dalai Lama recognized Gedhun Choekyi Nyima as the 11th incarnation of the Panchen Lama. The Chinese government reacted severely: Chadrel Rinpoche was disappeared from the Hanzhong Xiguan Airport in Chengdu on either 14 May, during his return from Beijing to Chengdu, or a few days later. The Tibetan Centre for Human Rights and Democracy reports that Champa Chungla, his assistant and deputy director of the monastery, was also disappeared from the airport. Gyara Tsering Samdrup, a business associate of the 10th Panchen Lama, was also detained. Then, the Chinese government kidnapped the Panchen Lama and his family on 17 May 1995. In 1996, Chadrel Rinpoche was formally expelled from the CPPCC.

After being forcibly detained for two years, on 21 April 1997, Chadrel Rinpoche was sentenced by the Shigatse Intermediate People's Court to six year's imprisonment at Chuandong prison in Sichuan province, and sentenced to three years of deprivation of political rights for "plotting to split the country" or "separatism", and for "revealing state secrets".

Chadrel Rinpoche sat in a hunger strike at Chuangdong against the unjust verdict. He was released in 2002, but then re-incarcerated under house arrest for an additional 10 years. Reports state his location was unknown, while others state he was held at a Chinese military camp near Lhasa. Chadrel Rinpoche's secretary-general for the 1989 search committee also disappeared from the airport. As his secretary, Champa (or Jampa) Chungla was sentenced to four years, also incarcerated and put under house arrest, and later died from a continuous denial of medical care. Samdrup was sentenced to two years imprisonment.

Chadrel Rinpoche was reported in 2011 to have died suspiciously from poison, at the age of 72. Reports from China allege his status is unknown.

== See also ==
- List of people who disappeared
