= 11th Panchen Lama controversy =

Controversy over the Panchen Lama abduction

Picture of Gedhun Choekyi Nyima before his abduction at 6 years of age (left), and a forensic image of him at 30 years of age (right), by Tim Widden

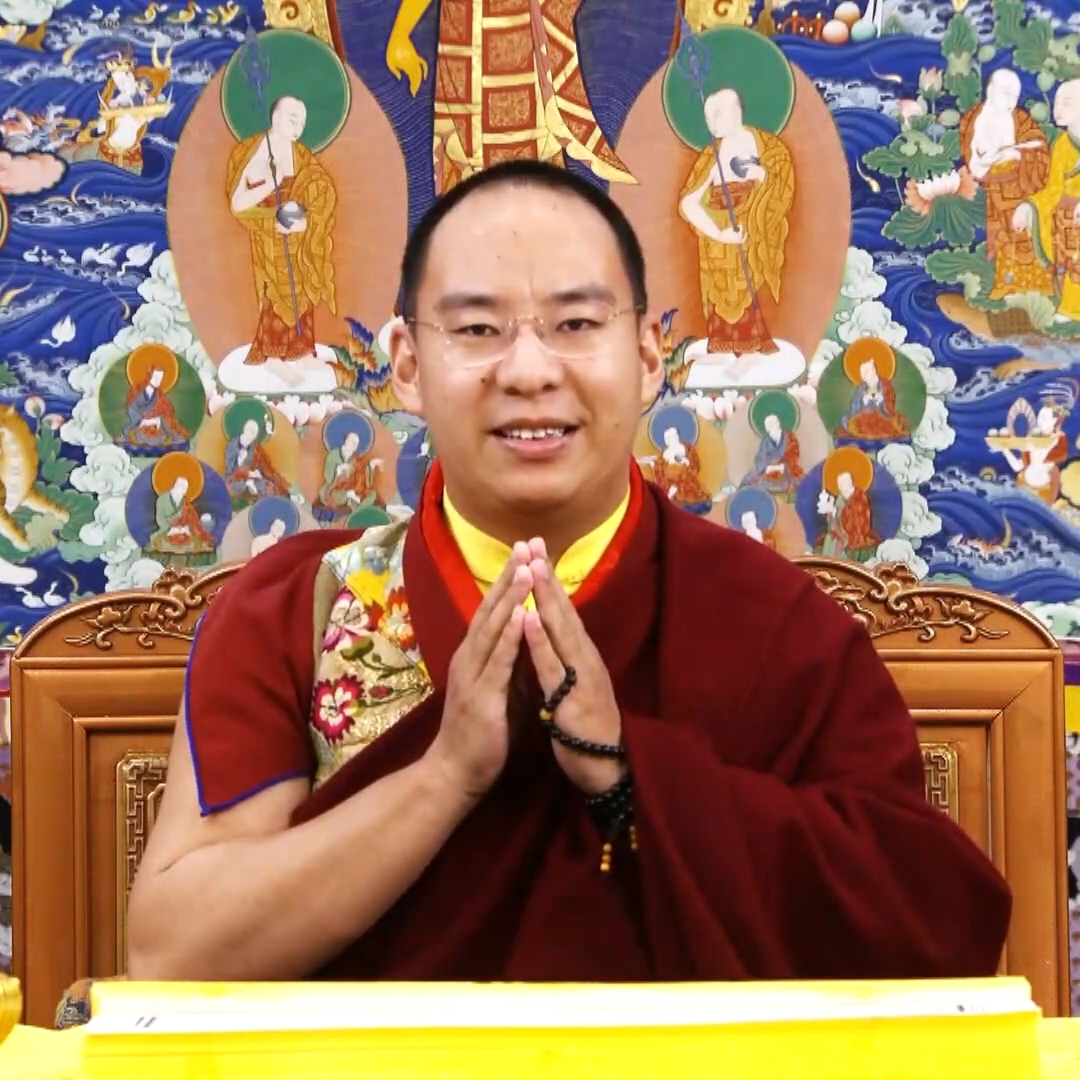
Gyaincain Norbu in 2023, who is recognized as the 11th Panchen Lama by the Chinese Communist Party.

The 11th Panchen Lama controversy centers on the 30-year-long enforced disappearance of Gedhun Choekyi Nyima, and on the recognition of the 11th Panchen Lama. The Panchen Lama is considered the second most important spiritual leader in Tibetan Buddhism after the Dalai Lama. Following the death of the 10th Panchen Lama, the 14th Dalai Lama recognized Gedhun Choekyi Nyima in 1995. Three days later, the Chinese Communist Party (CCP) abducted the Panchen Lama and his family. Months later, the PRC chose Gyaincain Norbu as its proxy Panchen Lama. During the traditional search process led by Chadrel Rinpoche, he indicated to the Dalai Lama that all signs pointed to Gedhun Choekyi Nyima, citing in particular that Dalai Lamas and Panchen Lamas traditionally recognize each other's incarnations. The PRC had established its own search committee, which included Chadrel Rinpoche and other monks, and wanted to use a lottery system referred to as the Golden Urn. Neither Gedhun Choekyi Nyima nor his family have been seen since the abduction. Chadrel Rinpoche was also arrested by Chinese authorities the day of the abduction, as were other people.

== Recognition and abduction ==
Before his death, the 10th Panchen Lama, Choekyi Gyaltsen, had been held for 15 years as a political prisoner of China, and after his release wrote the 70,000 Character Petition to CCP Chairman Mao Zedong on 18 May 1962. The Petition assessed China's occupation of Tibet, expressing a list of Tibetan grievances, also claiming that China's "use of routine propaganda regarding revolution, liberation, democratic reform and the so-called 'socialist paradise' was "pure deception"." He again was critical of Chinese policies in Tibet five days before his death on 28 January 1989, and Tibetans intensified the ongoing protests afterwards.

As a Tibetan search process began, the Chinese state-run CCTV network states that three days after the death of the 10th Panchen Lama, the Premier of China Li Peng published its decision on how the 11th Panchen Lama would be selected based on the feedback gathered from the committee of Tashi Lhunpo Monastery and monks on 30 January 1989.

Many Tibetans would not consider the 11th Panchen Lama incarnation legitimate unless he were identified according to Tibetan traditional means, including a search by the 10th Panchen Lama's closest Khenpos based on dreams and omens, and a formal recognition by the Dalai Lama. Often, the Nechung Oracle was also consulted. By 1994, five years after the death of the 10th Panchen Lama, ordinarily, the 11th Panchen Lama would have already been identified. The Nechung Oracle in Dharamsala had been consulted on the matter.

The leaders of the Chinese government wanted a process under their authority. Beijing planned to use a group of monks to identify a group of candidates, not only one, and then to use the golden urn to randomly select one of them, and to exclude the Dalai Lama from the process altogether.

Beijing later allowed Tashi Lhunpo Monastery's head Khenpo Chadrel Rinpoche, the head of the search team, to communicate with the Dalai Lama in hopes that a mutually acceptable process and candidate could be accomplished.

In March 1995, Chinese government officials proposed drawing a name from three to five slips in the urn. On 14 May 1995, the Dalai Lama preempted the officials' drawing of names by publicly recognizing Gedhun Choekyi Nyima as the 11th Panchen Lama.

On 17 May, the Chinese government abducted the recognized Panchen Lama. Then in November 1995 they selected a different boy, Gyaincain Norbu, using the golden urn lottery system. This decision was immediately denounced by the Dalai Lama. China continues to detain Gedhun Choekyi Nyima and his family in a place whose location has not been divulged to the public.

Chadrel Rinpoche, the Panchen Lama's senior Khenpo, was arrested at the Chamdo Airport while returning from Beijing, on 14 May 1995. Two years later on 8 May 1997, Chadrel Rinpoche was sentenced to six years in prison for splittism and betraying state secrets. He was then incarcerated in China, re-incarcerated under house arrest in a Chinese military camp near Lhasa, and the Unrepresented Nations and Peoples Organization reports he died of poisoning in 2011.

The Dalai Lama has denounced China by saying "the person who reincarnates has sole legitimate authority over where and how he or she takes rebirth and how that reincarnation is to be recognized." "It is a reality that no one else can force the person concerned, or manipulate him or her," "It is particularly inappropriate for Chinese communists, who explicitly reject even the idea of past and future lives, let alone the concept of reincarnate Tulkus, to meddle in the system of reincarnation and especially the reincarnations of the Dalai Lamas and Panchen Lamas."

== Recent developments ==
In April 2019, U.S. Congressman Jim McGovern said the Panchen Lama "will mark his 30th birthday as one of the world's longest-held prisoners of conscience", and referred to his enforced disappearance as a violation of the religious freedom of Tibetan Buddhists while also stating that the alternative Panchen Lama has been victimized by China as "a consequence of its policies to undermine and control the Tibetan people."

Earlier on 26 April 2018, the U.S. State Department issued a statement, "On April 25, we marked the birthday of the 11th Panchen Lama, Gedhun Choekyi Nyima, who has not appeared in public since he was reportedly abducted two decades ago by the Chinese government at age six." The statement also called for the immediate release of the 11th Panchen Lama.

An April 2020 joint petition prepared by 159 organizations spanning 18 countries requests the United Nations to pressure China for the Panchen Lama's release, as well as the release of his family.

In May 2020, CNN reports that the Central Tibetan Administration stated, "China's abduction of the Panchen Lama and forcible denial of his religious identity and the right to practice in his monastery is not only a violation of religious freedom but also a gross violation of human rights."

As of 2025, Gedhun Choekyi Nyima has been held as a political prisoner for 30 years. Five United Nations committees have opened cases, while numerous governments, including the European Parliament, Canada, U.K., and U.S. have called for China to release him.

== See also ==
- Buddhist Association of China
- Antireligious campaigns in China
