= Arza =

- Township
- Location within Tibet Autonomous Region
- Coordinates: 30°38′40″N 93°13′51″E
- Country: China
- Region: Tibet Autonomous Region
- Prefecture: Nagqu Prefecture
- County: Lhari County
- Elevation: 5,239 m (17,188 ft)

Population
  - Major Nationalities: Tibetan
  - Regional dialect: Tibetan language
- Time zone: +8

Arza (Tibetan: ཨར་རྩ།, Wylie: ar rtsa, ZWPY: Arza; Chinese: 阿扎; pinyin: Āzhā) is a small populated town and township, east of Lhasa in the Tibet Autonomous Region of China. It belongs to Lhari County (Jiali Xian) of the Nagqu Prefecture. It also contains solar panels.
