= Yuan Hongbing =

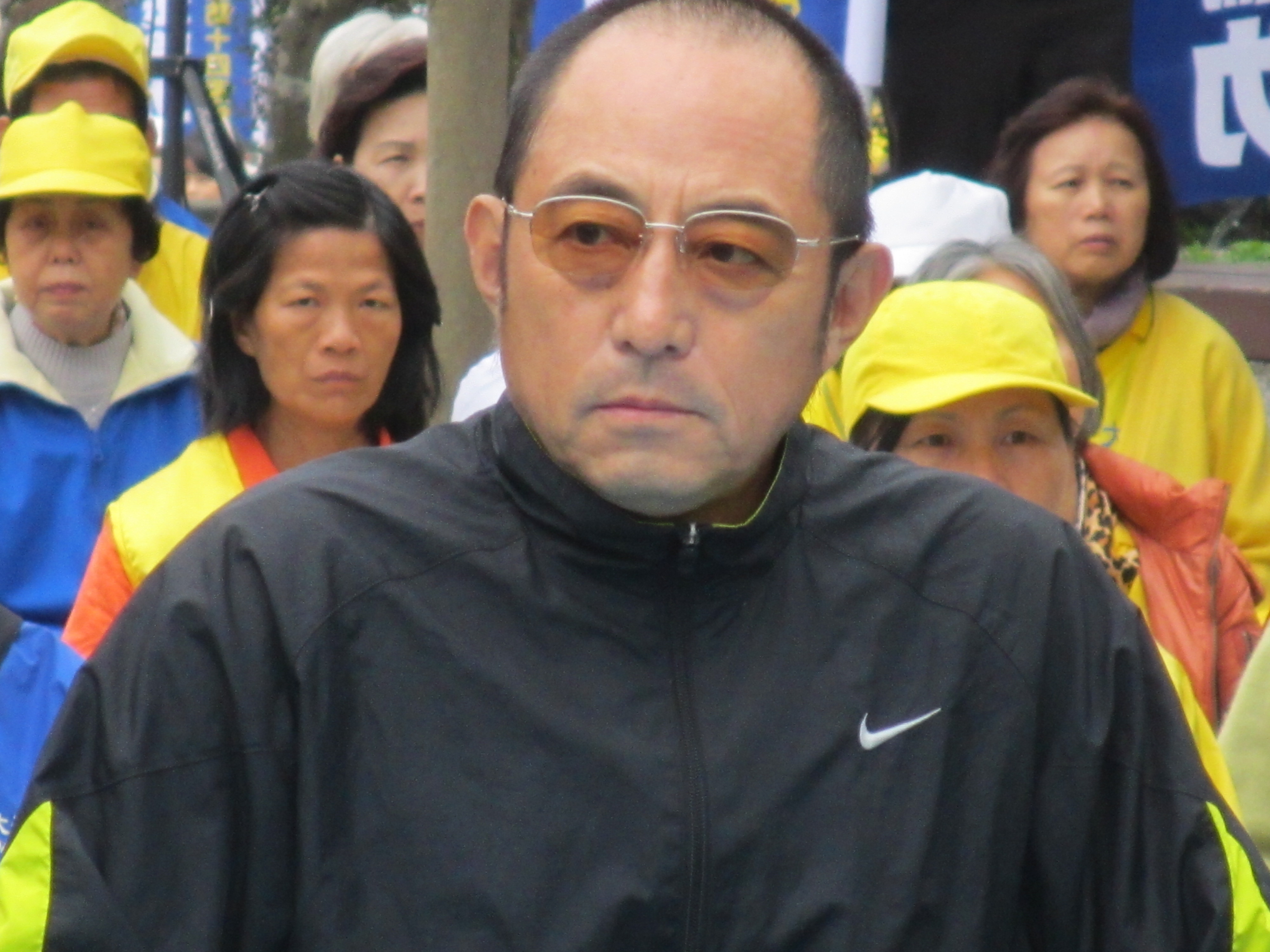
Yuan Hongbing

Yuan Hongbing (simplified Chinese: 袁红冰; traditional Chinese: 袁紅冰; pinyin: Yuán Hóngbīng; 1952 - ) is a Chinese-Australian jurist, novelist, and Chinese dissident.

== Biography ==
Born in Hohhot, Inner Mongolia, Yuan's parents worked at the Inner Mongolia Daily.

During the Cultural Revolution, Yuan was sent to the countryside to work as a "sent-down youth". In 1972, he became a factory worker in a local chemical factory. During that time, he organized his colleagues to engage in political campaigns. Following the reinstatement of university entrance exams, he enrolled at Peking University to study law. He graduated from Peking University with a master's degree in criminal procedure in 1986 and went on to head the School of Criminal Procedural Law at Peking University.

At the time of the Tiananmen Square protests and massacre in 1989, Yuan created and organized The Peking University Faculty Support Association, a political organization in support of the student movement. His creation of the organization put him under surveillance by the government.

In 1990, Yuan published Winds on the Plain (simplified Chinese: 荒原风; traditional Chinese: 荒原風; pinyin: huāngyuán fēng), a book which gained a considerable following among university students.

Yuan has also been active as a labour organiser. He was involved with Charter 08, a "Peace Charter" reportedly modeled on the Czechoslovak Charter 77. He also set up an unauthorized, politically liberal union – the League for the Protection of Working People of the People's Republic of China. In 1994, he was detained by government authorities and forced to leave Beijing. The US Department of State had mentioned his case in the China part of its Human Rights Report in 1994 and 1995. Yuan went into exile in the remote province of Guizhou from 1994, and became the Dean of the law school at Guizhou Normal University while under custody.

In 2004, Yuan and his assistant, Zhao Jing, traveled to Australia, and on 28 July, they sought political asylum. In June 2005 he accused the Chinese government of attempting to turn Australia into a "political colony".

In 2009, Yuan published his book Taiwan Disaster (台灣大劫難：2012不戰而勝台灣), a highly critical account of contemporary Taiwanese society and politics and detailed his views on the role of the CCP in pursuing unification in Taiwan.

In 2011, he declared that Hu Jintao had masterminded the death of the 10th Panchen Lama.

In October 2013, Yuan released his new book Assassination of the Buddha–the Truth of the Death of His Holiness the 10th Panchen Lama (Chinese:殺佛——十世班禪大師蒙難真相) in Taipei. The book, coauthored with Lhade Namloyak, a Tibetan poet and researcher, unveils what he claims to be the conspiracy of the century, the assassination by the Chinese Communist Party (CCP) of Choekyi Gyaltsen, 10th Panchen Lama. The book contends that Deng Xiaoping and an oligarchic group of high-ranking party officials made the decision to assassinate the 10th Panchen Lama, and, with the support of Hu Jintao, Wen Jiabao, and others, the Lama was poisoned.

== Major publications ==
Literature Writings

1. Freedom in the Sunset, published in October 2004
2. Lamentation of Literature, published in October 2004
3. Golden Holy Mountain, published in March 2005
4. Back to Desolation, published in March 2005
5. Culture and Destination, published in March 2009

Philosophy Writings

1. Winds on the Plain, published in May 1990
2. Philosophy of Heroic Personality, published in June 2004
3. The Love of A Philosopher, published in September 2010
4. Lead to the Top of the Sky—Crossing Himalayas, published in March 2011
5. A Burning Requiem, published in July 2013

Political Philosophy Writings

1. Catastrophe of Human Beings, published in September 2012

Modern Politics Writings

1. The Taiwan Crisis, published in November 2009 (in English, Japanese, French, and Chinese)
2. Taiwan Grand State Strategies, published in September 2010
3. Grand Spirit of Taiwan, published in September 2011
4. Incarnated Taiwan, published in October 2012
5. With Namloyak, Assassination of the Buddha —— The Truth about the Death of His Holiness the 10th Panchen Lama, published in October 2013

== See also ==
- Chinese nationalism
