= Hanzhong Chenggu Airport =

Hanzhong Chenggu Airport 汉中城固机场
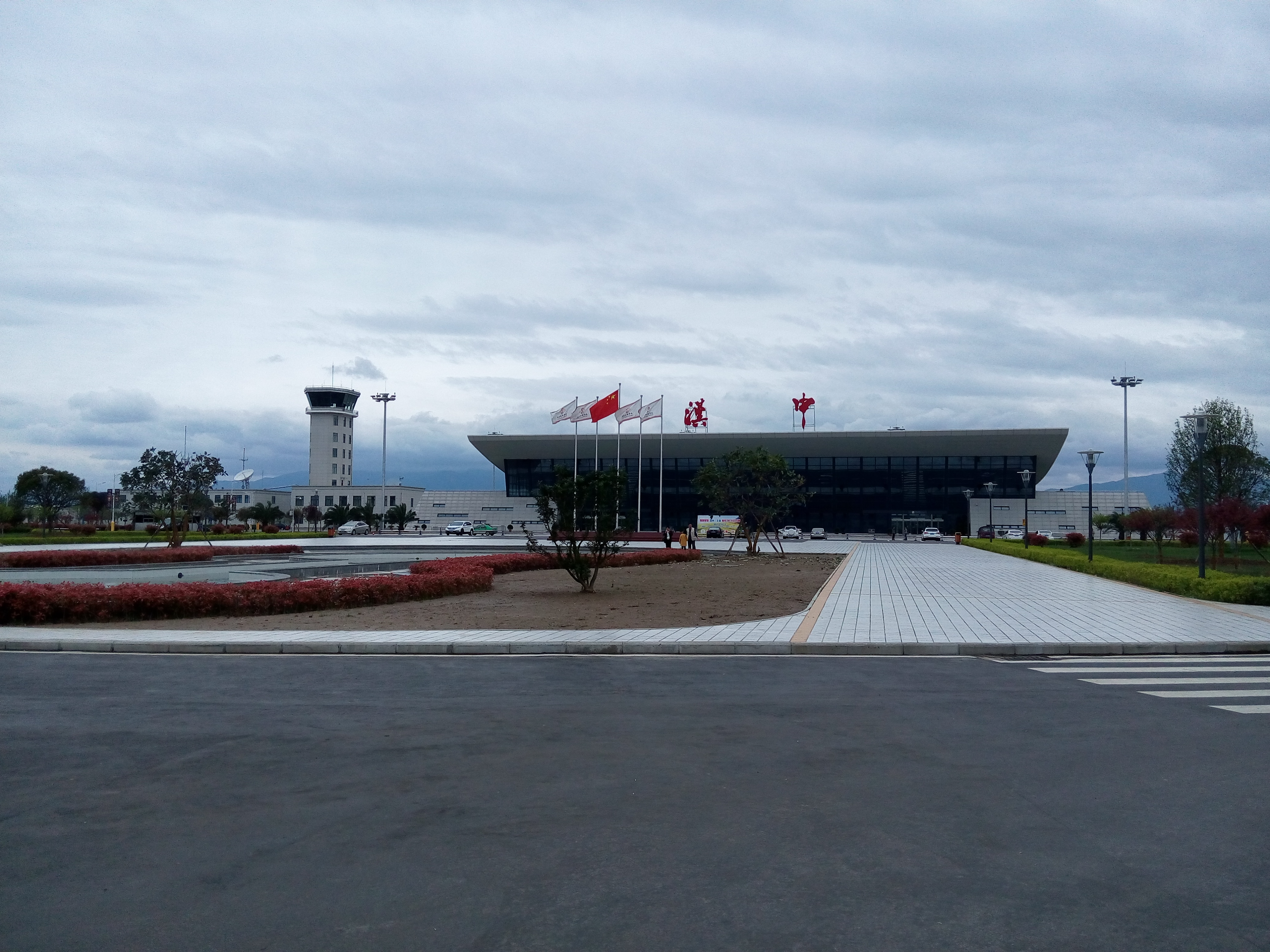
- IATA: HZG; ICAO: ZLHZ

Summary
- Airport type: Military/Public
- Serves: Hanzhong
- Location: Chenggu, Shaanxi, China
- Opened: 13 August 2014; 11 years ago
- Coordinates: 33°08′12″N 107°12′08″E
- Website: hanzhong.cwag.com

Map
- Location of airport in China

Runways
Direction	Length		Surface
Direction	m	ft	Surface
07/25	2,500	8,202	Concrete

Statistics (2021)
- Passengers: 409,731
- Aircraft movements: 13,528
- Cargo (metric tons): 1,056.3

Hanzhong Chenggu Airport
- Simplified Chinese: 汉中城固机场
- Traditional Chinese: 漢中城固機場
Transcriptions
Standard Mandarin
- Hanyu Pinyin: Hànzhōng Chénggù Jīchǎng

Hanzhong Chenggu Airport (IATA: HZG, ICAO: ZLHZ), or Chenggu Air Base, is a dual-use military and civil airport serving the city of Hanzhong in Shaanxi province, China. Located in Chenggu County northeast of Hanzhong, it was initially established as a military airport in 1994, before opening as a dual-use airport in 2014, replacing the old Hanzhong Xiguan Airport, which could not be expanded due to its proximity to the city center.

== History ==
In the autumn of 1944, Zhu Wei, director of the 39th Engineering Division of the Aviation Commission of the Republic of China, led more than 100 technicians to Wuqusi, Liulin Town, Chenggu County, to organize the survey and construction of the airport. The Hanzhong Commissioner's Office mobilized 300 migrant workers from each of Chenggu and Nanzheng counties to start building a small civil airport.

In the spring of 1945, the Commissioner's Office dispatched more than 80,000 migrant workers from seven counties in the region to continue to build and expand it into a military airport. The airport covers an area of more than 1,000 acres, with 692,300 cubic meters of earthwork and 297,600 cubic meters of stone.

In 1950, the airport was turned into Xinhan Labor Farm.

In 1966, Jinsong Machinery Factory (codename No. 182 Factory) under the Ministry of Aerospace Industry was built in Wuqusi, setting up a test flight area for the final assembly of domestic transport aircraft, and at the same time, the original Wuqusi Airport was rebuilt.

In 1967, a unit of the People's Liberation Army Air Force was stationed near the airport.

In 1971, the airport reconstruction project was completed, called "Liulin Airport", which was managed and used by a certain department of the PLA Air Force.

In February 1979, Jinsong Machinery Factory, Tonghui Machinery Factory and 012 Base Design Institute merged to establish Shaanxi Aircraft Corporation, and Liulin Airport also became a test airport for Shaanxi Aircraft Manufacturing Company, with test flight stations and other institutions.

Transformation into a dual-use airport with civilian facilities commenced in late December 2011 with an estimated total investment of 580 million yuan, and the airport was opened for commercial flights on 13 August 2014.

== Facilities ==
The expansion project includes a new runway that is 2,500 meters long and 45 meters wide, and a 5,000-square-meter terminal building. The airport is designed to handle 300,000 passengers and 1,300 tons of cargo annually by 2020.

== Airlines and destinations ==
Airlines	Destinations
Air China	Beijing-Capital
China Express Airlines	Guiyang, Yinchuan, Xiamen
China United Airlines	Beijing–Daxing
Donghai Airlines	Shenzhen
Hainan Airlines	Guangzhou, Hangzhou, Shenzhen
Juneyao Air	Shanghai–Pudong
Kunming Airlines	Kunming
Tianjin Airlines	Nantong, Yulin (Shaanxi)
Urumqi Air	Nanjing, Urumqi, Wenzhou

== See also ==
- List of airports in China
- List of the busiest airports in China
- List of People's Liberation Army Air Force airbases
