= Seni, Nagqu =

Seni 色尼区 • གསེར་རྙེད་ཆུས།
- District
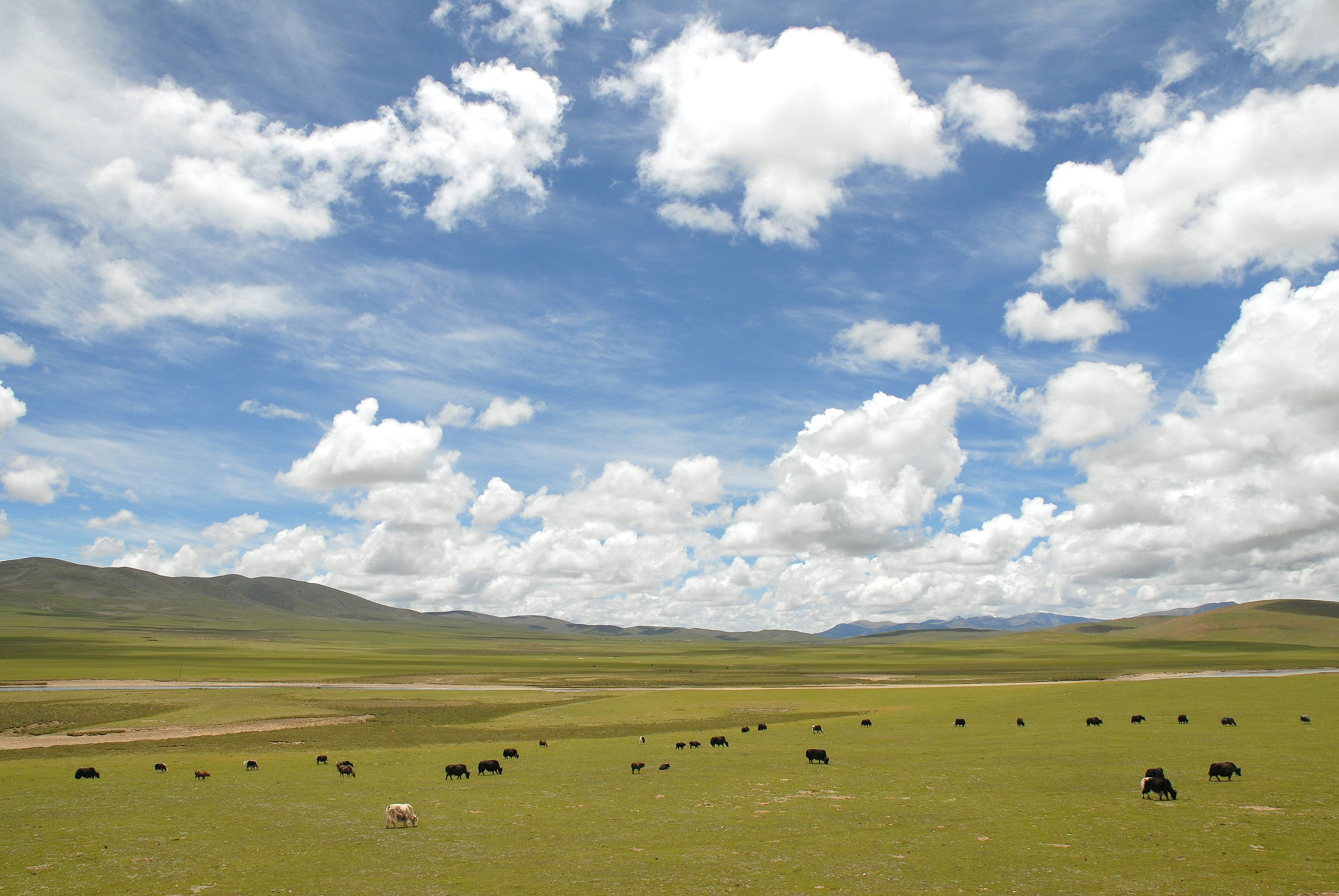

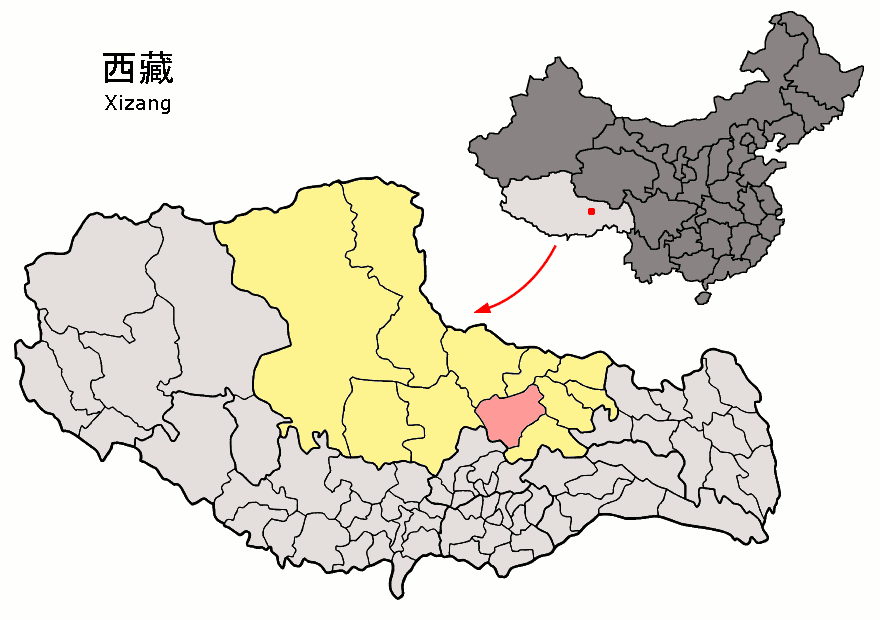
- Location of Seni (red) within Nagqu (yellow) and the Tibet Autonomous Region

- Location of the seat in Tibet Seni (China)
- Coordinates (Nagqu government): 31°28′37″N 92°03′04″E
- Country: China
- Autonomous Region: Tibet
- Prefecture-level city: Nagqu
- District seat: Nagqu

Area
  - Total: 16,196.45 km^{2} (6,253.48 sq mi)
- Elevation: 4,513 m (14,806 ft)

Population (2020)
  - Total: 104,490
  - Density: 6.4514/km^{2} (16.709/sq mi)
- Time zone: UTC+8 (China Standard)
- Website: www.xznq.gov.cn

Seni, Nagqu

Chinese name
- Simplified Chinese: 色尼区
- Traditional Chinese: 色尼區
Transcriptions
Standard Mandarin
- Hanyu Pinyin: Sèní Qū

Tibetan name
- Tibetan: གསེར་རྙེད་ཆུས།
Transcriptions
- Wylie: gser rnyed chus
- Tibetan Pinyin: Seni Qü

Seni District (Tibetan: གསེར་རྙེད་ཆུས།; Chinese: 色尼区, until 2017 Nagqu County) is a district within the Nagqu of the Tibet Autonomous Region, China.

== Geography ==
Located in the northern part of the Tibet Autonomous Region, Seni ranges in latitude from 30° 31' to 31° 55' N and in longitude from 91° 12' to 93° 02' E. Bordering counties within Nagqu are Lhari to the southeast, Biru to the east, Nyainrong to the northeast, Amdo to the northwest, and Baingoin to the west, while Lhasa City, the regional capital, is to the south.

=== Climate ===
With an elevation of around 4,500 metres (14,800 ft), Seni historically had a harsh alpine climate (Köppen ETH), closely bordering on a subalpine climate (Dwc). However, according to averages from 1991 to 2020, Seni now has a subalpine climate (Köppen Dwc), because the hottest month, July, has an average temperature of just 10.0 °C (50.0 °F); there are already signs that trees can grow.

Seni features long, frigid and dry winters, and short, cool summers. In winter, temperatures frequently drop below −20 °C (−4 °F) at night and in summer typically rise to 16 °C (61 °F) during the day. The monthly 24-hour average daily temperature ranges from −11.3 °C (11.7 °F) in January to 10.0 °C (50.0 °F) in July, and the annual mean is −0.1 °C (31.8 °F). From June to September, a majority of days receives some precipitation, and over 80 percent of the annual precipitation is delivered.

Climate data for Seni District, Nagqu (1991–2020 normals, extremes 1971–2010)
| Month | Jan | Feb | Mar | Apr | May | Jun | Jul | Aug | Sep | Oct | Nov | Dec | Year |
|---|---|---|---|---|---|---|---|---|---|---|---|---|---|
| Record high °C (°F) | 7.7 (45.9) | 10.3 (50.5) | 16.1 (61.0) | 16.6 (61.9) | 21.3 (70.3) | 24.2 (75.6) | 22.6 (72.7) | 21.7 (71.1) | 22.2 (72.0) | 18.0 (64.4) | 12.8 (55.0) | 11.8 (53.2) | 24.2 (75.6) |
| Mean daily maximum °C (°F) | −2.4 (27.7) | −0.1 (31.8) | 3.4 (38.1) | 7.4 (45.3) | 11.5 (52.7) | 15.3 (59.5) | 16.3 (61.3) | 16.2 (61.2) | 13.8 (56.8) | 8.3 (46.9) | 2.7 (36.9) | −0.4 (31.3) | 7.7 (45.8) |
| Daily mean °C (°F) | −11.3 (11.7) | −8.5 (16.7) | −4.5 (23.9) | −0.2 (31.6) | 4.2 (39.6) | 8.4 (47.1) | 10.0 (50.0) | 9.5 (49.1) | 6.7 (44.1) | 0.8 (33.4) | −6 (21) | −9.9 (14.2) | −0.1 (31.9) |
| Mean daily minimum °C (°F) | −19.1 (−2.4) | −16.3 (2.7) | −11.9 (10.6) | −7.1 (19.2) | −2 (28) | 2.9 (37.2) | 5.0 (41.0) | 4.6 (40.3) | 1.7 (35.1) | −4.9 (23.2) | −12.7 (9.1) | −17.8 (0.0) | −6.5 (20.3) |
| Record low °C (°F) | −41.2 (−42.2) | −32.2 (−26.0) | −27.3 (−17.1) | −20.1 (−4.2) | −12.5 (9.5) | −8.8 (16.2) | −4.9 (23.2) | −6.1 (21.0) | −9.6 (14.7) | −19.6 (−3.3) | −31.7 (−25.1) | −34.6 (−30.3) | −41.2 (−42.2) |
| Average precipitation mm (inches) | 5.2 (0.20) | 3.2 (0.13) | 7.5 (0.30) | 11.9 (0.47) | 40.9 (1.61) | 90.2 (3.55) | 111.0 (4.37) | 100.9 (3.97) | 71.7 (2.82) | 22.0 (0.87) | 3.5 (0.14) | 2.0 (0.08) | 470 (18.51) |
| Average precipitation days (≥ 0.1 mm) | 4.2 | 3.4 | 4.8 | 7.2 | 14.9 | 20.6 | 20.9 | 19.9 | 18.8 | 8.1 | 3.1 | 1.9 | 127.8 |
| Average snowy days | 5.9 | 6.4 | 8.6 | 12.6 | 18.8 | 6.7 | 0.3 | 0.7 | 6.1 | 11.8 | 5.1 | 3.7 | 86.7 |
| Average relative humidity (%) | 41 | 36 | 37 | 45 | 55 | 63 | 67 | 67 | 68 | 56 | 47 | 40 | 52 |
| Mean monthly sunshine hours | 213.7 | 198.7 | 222.6 | 221.0 | 238.0 | 216.6 | 208.0 | 205.5 | 209.5 | 243.6 | 240.4 | 232.9 | 2,650.5 |
| Percentage possible sunshine | 66 | 63 | 59 | 57 | 56 | 51 | 48 | 51 | 57 | 70 | 77 | 75 | 61 |
Source 1: China Meteorological Administration
Source 2: Weather China

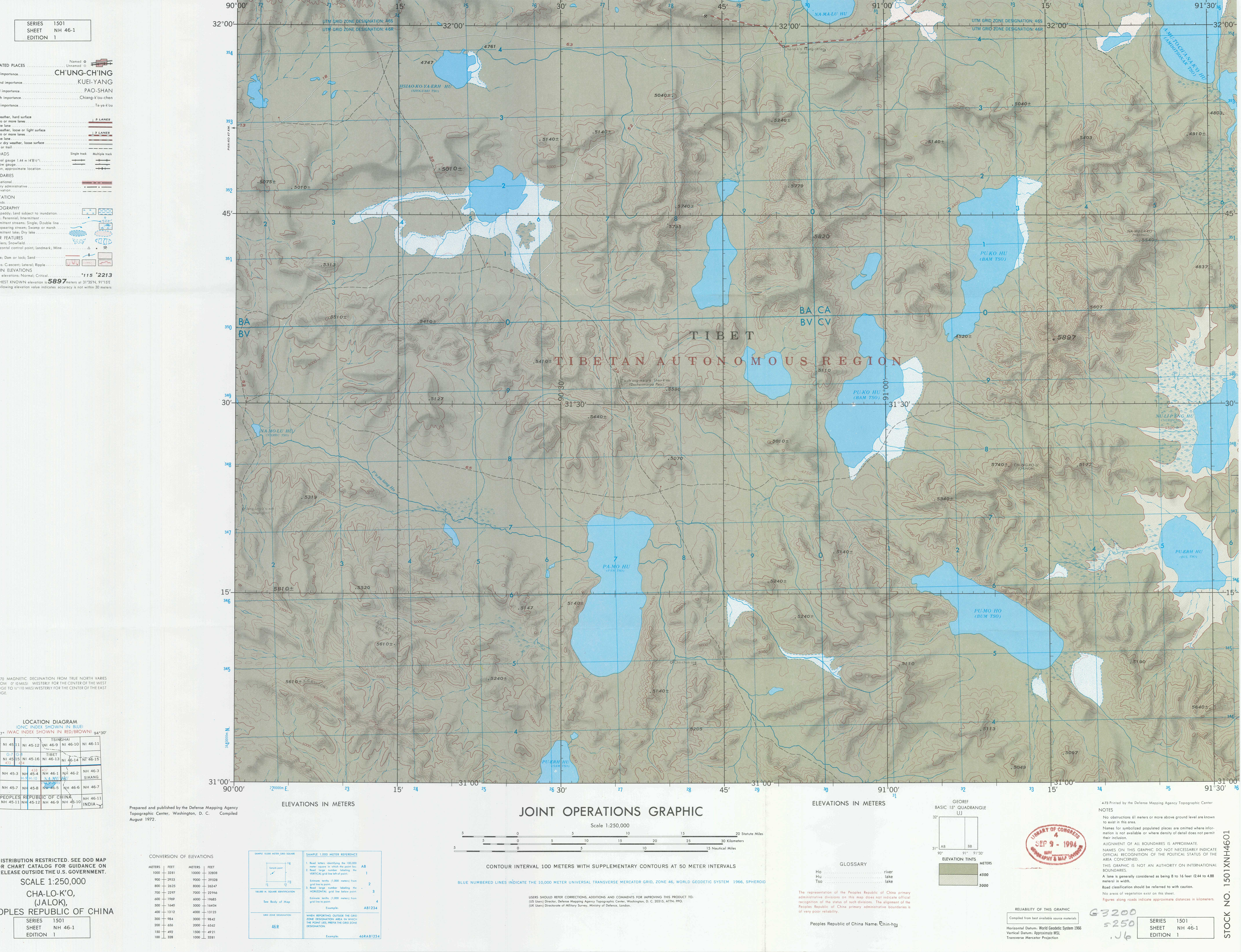

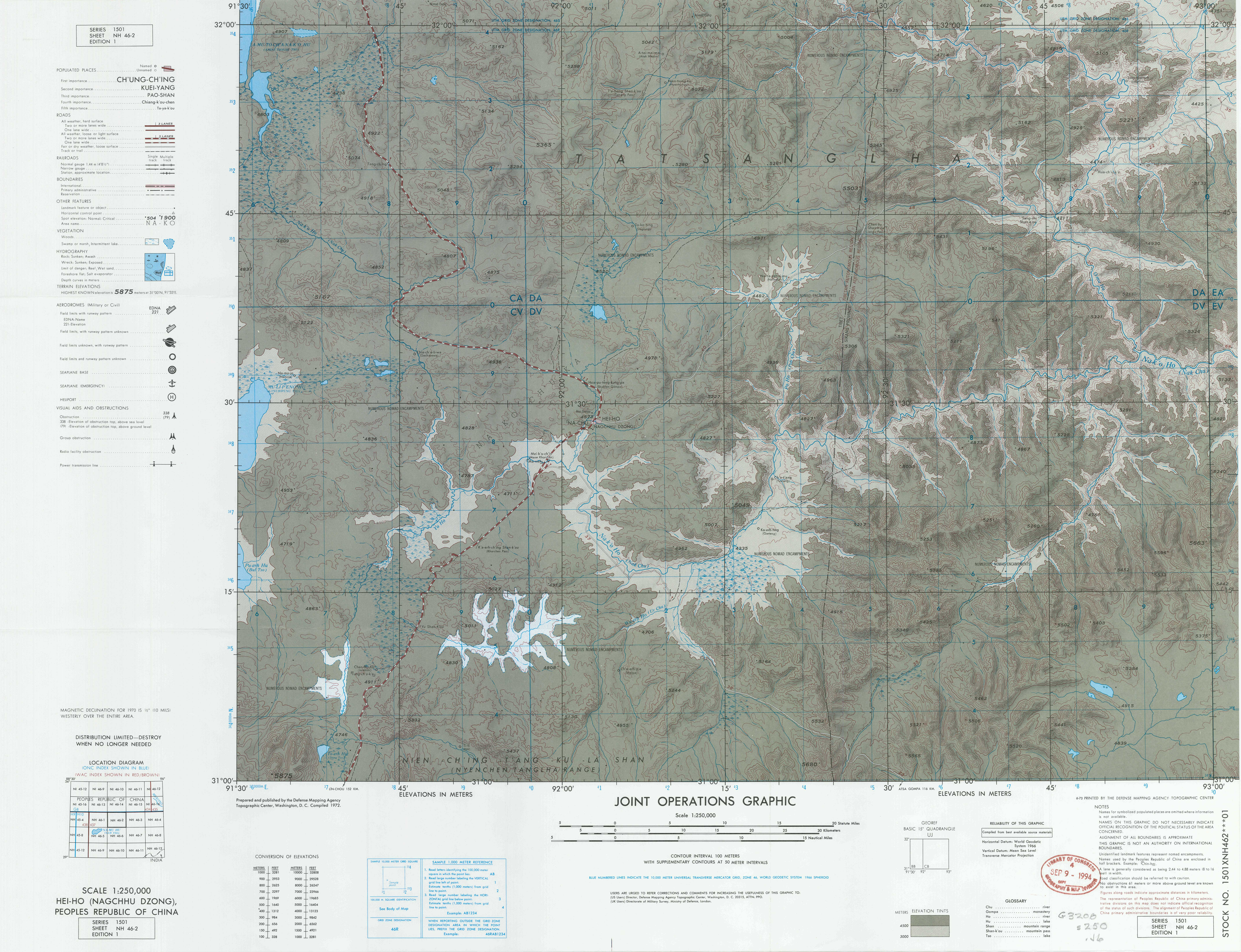

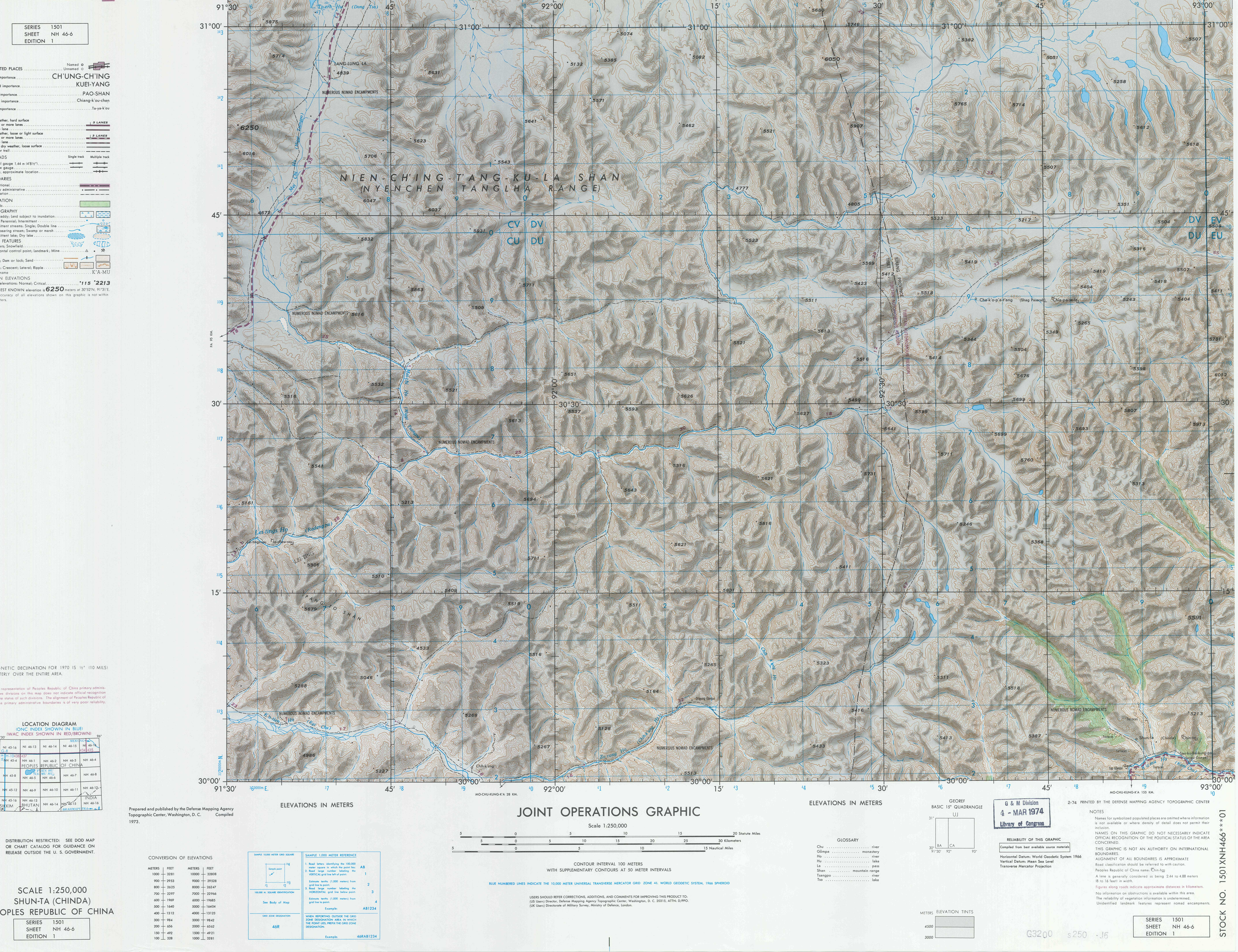

== Administrative divisions ==
Seni District is made up of 3 towns and 9 townships:

| Name | Chinese | Hanyu Pinyin | Tibetan | Wylie |
|---|---|---|---|---|
Towns
| Nagqu Town | 那曲镇 | Nàqǔ zhèn | ནག་ཆུ་གྲོང་རྡལ། | nag chu grong rdal |
| Lhomar Town | 罗玛镇 | Luómǎ zhèn | ལྷོ་མ་གྲོང་རྡལ། | lho ma grong rdal |
| Golug Town | 古露镇 | Gǔlù zhèn | ཀོ་ལུང་གྲོང་རྡལ། | ko lung grong rdal |
Townships
| Taksar Township | 达萨乡 | Dásà xiāng | སྟག་གསར་ཤང་། | stag gsar shang |
| Yöchak Township | 油恰乡 | Yóuqià xiāng | ཡོས་ཆགས་ཤང་། | yos chogs shang |
| Shamong Township | 香茂乡 | Xiāngmào xiāng | ཤ་མོང་ཤང་། | sha mong shang |
| Namarche Township | 那么切乡 | Nàmeqiē xiāng | ན་དམར་ཆེ་ཤང་། | na dmar che shang |
| Daqên Township | 达前乡 | Dáqián xiāng | སྟར་ཆེན་ཤང་། | star chen shang |
| Lumé Township | 劳麦乡 | Láomài xiāng | ལུ་སྨད་ཤང་། | lu smad shang |
| Kormang Township | 孔玛乡 | Kǒngmǎ xiāng | འཁོར་མང་ཤང་། | 'khor mang shang |
| Nyima Township | 尼玛乡 | Nímǎ xiāng | ཉི་མ་ཤང་། | nyi ma shang |
| Serzhong Township | 色雄乡 | Sèxióng xiāng | གསེར་གཞོང་ཤང་། | gser gzhong shang |

== Transport ==
- China National Highway 317 runs from Chengdu in Sichuan province to Nagqu County.
- Nagqu railway station (Qinghai–Tibet Railway)
