= Tibet University of Traditional Tibetan Medicine =

University in Lhasa, Tibet, China

Coordinates: 29.6684°N 91.1268°E

Tibet University of Tibetan Medicine (西藏藏医药大学, Tibetan: བོད་ལྗོངས་བོད་ལུགས་གས་རིག་སློབ་ཆེན།) is a full-time university. It is publicly funded, provincially-affiliated, general institution of higher education of the People's Republic of China, located in Lhasa, Tibet Autonomous Region.

== History ==
The school was formerly known as Tibetan Medical School of Tibet and Department of Tibetan Medicine in Tibet University. In September 1989 (36 years ago), Tibetan Medical School of Tibet University was established. In February 1993, with the approval of the State Education Commission, the school became independent as Medicine of Medicine of Chagpori and was officially included in the national sequence of general higher education. In 2002, the Ministry of Education further clarified the name as Tibetan Medical School of Tibet, which has become the world's first independently established school of higher education for cultivating Tibetan medicine high-level professionals in higher education. In 2018, the name was changed to Tibetan Medicine University of Tibet.

In 2023, in order to realize the integrated development of medical education and research in Tibetan medicine, the Tibet University of Tibetan Medicine and the Tibetan Hospital of the Tibet Autonomous Region signed an all-round strategic cooperation agreement in Lhasa.
