= Qinghai Normal University =

University in Xining, Qinghai, China

Coordinates: 36.639319°N 101.739811°E

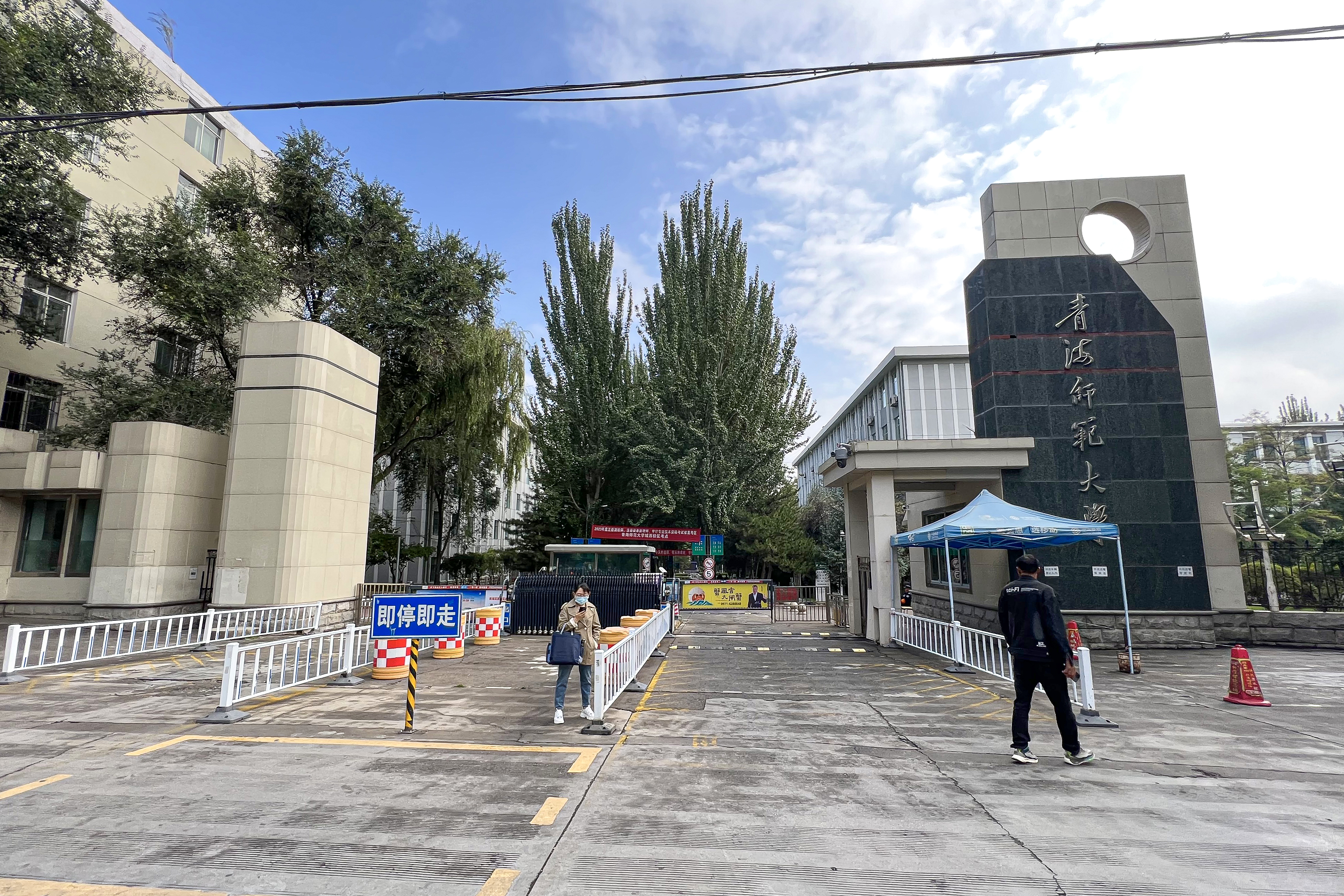
Chengxi campus

Qinghai Normal University (simplified Chinese: 青海师范大学; traditional Chinese: 青海師範大學; pinyin: Qīnghǎi Shīfàn Dàxué) is a university in Xining, Qinghai, China. Founded in 1956, it lies on the Huangshui River and has 2 colleges, 14 departments, 3 branches and a research institute.
