= Choekyi Gyaltsen, 10th Panchen Lama =

10th Panchen Lama of the Gelug School of Tibetan Buddhism (1938–1989)

Choekyi Gyaltsen ཆོས་ཀྱི་རྒྱལ་མཚན
- The 10th Panchen Lama
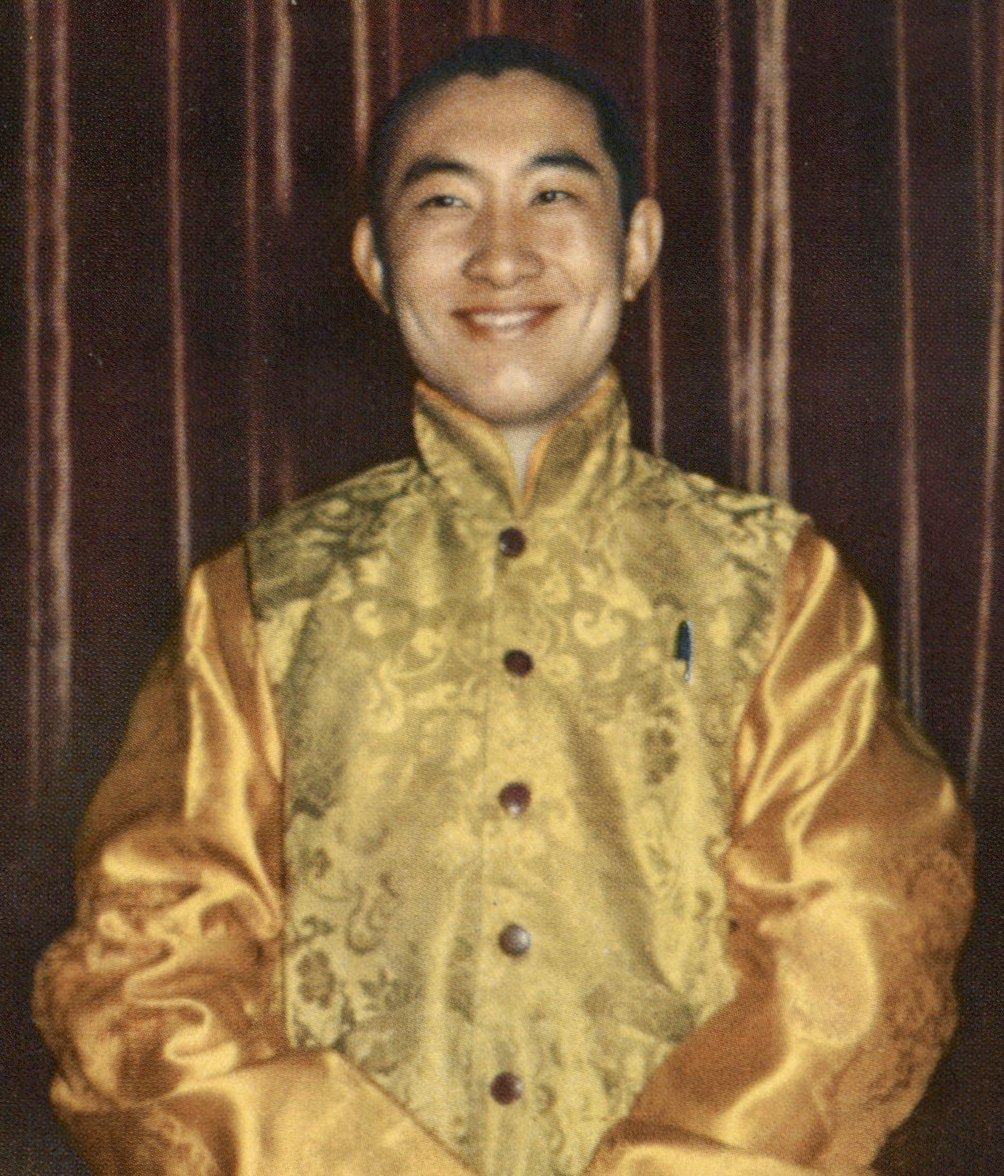
- The Panchen Lama c. 1955

10th Panchen Lama
- Reign: 3 June 1949 – 28 January 1989
- Predecessor: Thubten Choekyi Nyima
- Successor: 11th Panchen Lama: Gedhun Choekyi Nyima (Selected by the 14th Dalai Lama); Gyaincain Norbu (Selected by the Chinese leadership)

Director of the Preparatory Committee for the Tibet Autonomous Region (acting)
- In office: 1959 – 1964
- Predecessor: 14th Dalai Lama
- Successor: Ngapoi Ngawang Jigme (acting)

Vice Chairman of the Standing Committee of the National People's Congress
- In office: 27 September 1954 – 27 April 1959
- In office: 10 September 1980 – 28 January 1989

Vice Chairman of the Chinese People's Political Consultative Conference
- In office: 25 December 1954 – 5 January 1965
- In office: 2 July 1979 – 17 June 1983
- Born: Gönpo Tseten; 19 February 1938; Bido, Xunhua County, Qinghai, Republic of China, known as Amdo
- Died: 28 January 1989 (aged 50); Shigatse, Tibet Autonomous Region, China, known as Ü-Tsang
- Burial: Tashi Lhunpo Monastery, Shigatse
- Spouse: Li Jie
- Issue: Yabshi Pan Rinzinwangmo
- Father: Gonpo Tseten
- Mother: Sonam Drolma
- Religion: Tibetan Buddhism
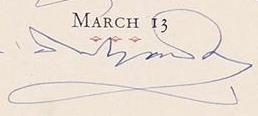
- Signature

Official title: 10th Panchen Erdeni
- Traditional Chinese: 第十世班禪額爾德尼
- Simplified Chinese: 第十世班禅额尔德尼
- Literal meaning: Number-10-lifetime + Pandita-Chenpo (Sanskrit-Tibetan Buddhist title, meaning "Great Scholar") + Erdeni (Manchu loanword from Mongolian, meaning "treasure")
Transcriptions
Standard Mandarin
- Hanyu Pinyin: Dìshíshì Bānchán É'ěrdéní
- Wade–Giles: TiShih Shih Pan Ch'an E Erh Te Ni
- Tongyong Pinyin: Dishih shih ban chan e er de ni
Yue: Cantonese
- Yale Romanization: DiShr Shr Ban Chan E Er De Ni

Dharma name: Lobsang Trinley Lhündrub Chöekyi Gyaltsen

Chinese name
- Traditional Chinese: 羅桑赤列倫珠確吉堅贊
- Simplified Chinese: 罗桑赤列伦珠确吉坚赞
- Literal meaning: 善慧事業運成法幢
Transcriptions
Standard Mandarin
- Hanyu Pinyin: Luósāng Chìliè Lúnzhū Quèjí Jiānzàn

Tibetan name
- Tibetan: བློ་བཟང་ཕྲིན་ལས་ལྷུན་གྲུབ་ཆོས་ཀྱི་རྒྱལ་མཚན་་
Transcriptions
- Wylie: Blo-bzang Phrin-las Lhun-grub Chos-kyi Rgyal-mtshan
- Tibetan Pinyin: Lobsang Chinlai Lhünchub Qoigyi Gyaicain

Original name: Gönpo Tseten

Chinese name
- Traditional Chinese: 貢布慈丹
- Simplified Chinese: 贡布慈丹
Transcriptions
Standard Mandarin
- Hanyu Pinyin: Gòngbù Cídān

Tibetan name
- Tibetan: མགོན་པོ་ཚེ་བརྟན་
Transcriptions
- Wylie: mgon po tshe brtan
- Tibetan Pinyin: Gönbo Cêdän

Lobsang Trinley Lhündrub Chöekyi Gyaltsen (born Gönpo Tseten; 19 February 1938 – 28 January 1989) was the tenth Panchen Lama, officially the 10th Panchen Erdeni (Chinese: 第十世班禅额尔德尼; lit. 'Number-10-lifetime Great Scholar the Treasure'), of the Gelug school of Tibetan Buddhism. According to Tibetan Buddhism, Panchen Lamas are living emanations of Buddha Amitabha. He was often referred to simply as Choekyi Gyaltsen.

== Recognition ==
The Panchen Lama incarnation line began in the seventeenth century after the 5th Dalai Lama gave Choekyi Gyeltsen the title, and declared him to be an emanation of Buddha Amitaba. Officially, he became the first Panchen Lama in the lineage, while he had also been the sixteenth abbot of Tashilhunpo Monastery.

The 10th Panchen Lama was born as Gonpo Tseten on 19 February 1938, in Bido, today's Xunhua Salar Autonomous County of Qinghai, known as Amdo. His father was also called Gonpo Tseten and his mother was Sonam Drolma. After the Ninth Panchen Lama died in 1937, two simultaneous searches for the tenth Panchen Lama produced different boys, with the government in Lhasa preferring a boy from Xikang, and the Ninth Panchen Lama's khenpos and associates choosing Gonpo Tseten. On 3 June 1949, the Republic of China (ROC) government declared its support for Gonpo Tseten.

On 11 June 1949, at twelve years of age (using the Tibetan counting system), Gonpo Tseten was enthroned at the major Gelugpa monastery in Amdo, Kumbum Jampa Ling monastery as the 10th Panchen Lama and given the name Lobsang Trinley Lhündrub Chökyi Gyaltsen. Attending were also Guan Jiyu, the head of the Mongolian and Tibetan Affairs Commission, and ROC Kuomintang Governor of Qinghai, Ma Bufang. Still in Lhasa, the Dalai Lama recognized the Panchen Lama Choekyi Gyaltsen a few years later, after they met.

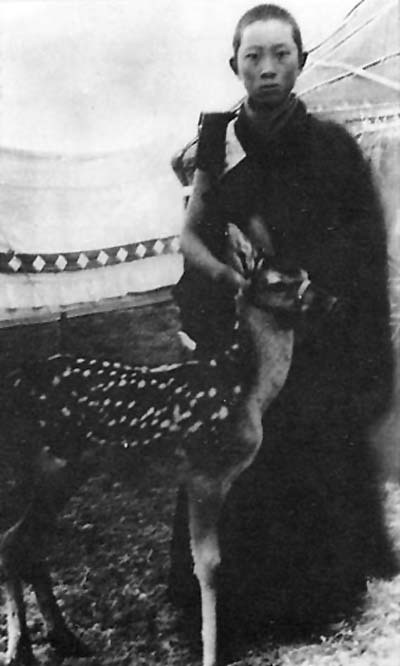
Young Panchen Lama in 1947

== Chinese Civil War ==
The ROC wanted to use Choekyi Gyaltsen to create a broad anti-Communist base in Southwest China. The ROC's Kuomintang formulated a plan where three Tibetan Khampa divisions would be assisted by the Panchen Lama to oppose the Communists.

When Lhasa denied Choekyi Gyaltsen the territory the Panchen Lama traditionally controlled, he asked Ma Bufang to help him lead an army against Tibet in September 1949. Ma tried to persuade the Panchen Lama to come with the Kuomintang government to Taiwan when the Communist victory approached, but the Panchen Lama declared his support for the Communist People's Republic of China instead. Moreover, the Dalai Lama's regency was unstable, having suffered a civil war in 1947, and the Kuomintang took advantage of this to expand its influence in Lhasa.

== People's Republic of China ==
The Panchen Lama reportedly supported China's claim of sovereignty over Tibet, and supported China's reform policies for Tibet. Radio Beijing broadcast the religious leader's call for Tibet to be "liberated" into China, which created pressure on the Lhasa government to negotiate with the People's Republic.

At Kumbum Monastery, the Panchen Lama gave a Kalacakra initiation in 1951. That year, the Panchen Lama was invited to Beijing as the Tibetan delegation was signing the 17-Point Agreement and telegramming the Dalai Lama to implement the Agreement. He was recognized by the 14th Dalai Lama when they met in 1952.

In September 1954, the Dalai Lama and the Panchen Lama went to Beijing to attend the first session of the first National People's Congress, meeting Mao Zedong and other leaders. The Panchen Lama was soon elected a member of the Standing Committee of the National People's Congress and in December 1954 he became the deputy chairman of the Chinese People's Political Consultative Conference. In 1956, the Panchen Lama went to India on a pilgrimage together with the Dalai Lama. When the Dalai Lama fled to India in 1959, the Panchen Lama publicly supported the Chinese government, and the Chinese brought him to Lhasa and made him chairman of the Preparatory Committee for the Tibet Autonomous Region.

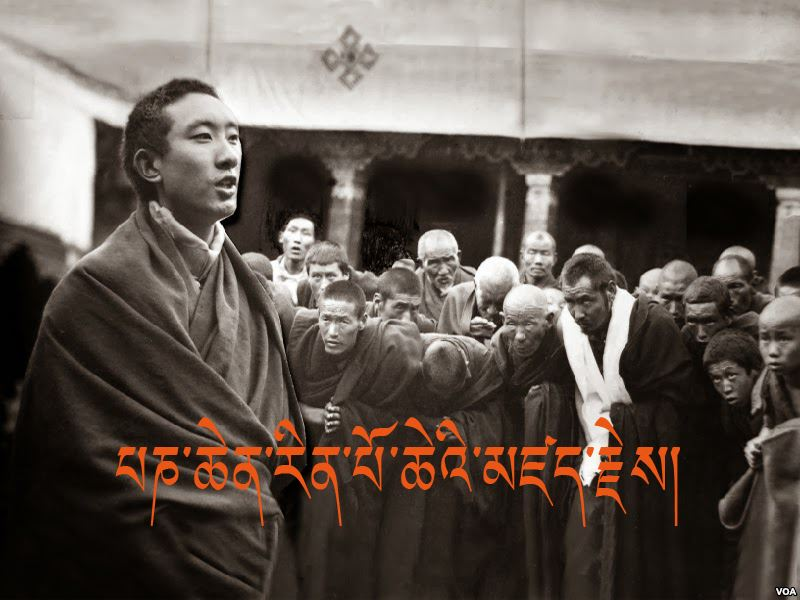
The young Panchen Lama at a Tibetan monastery

== Petition and arrest ==
=== 70,000 Character Petition ===
After a tour through Tibet in 1962, the Panchen Lama wrote a document addressed to Prime Minister Zhou Enlai denouncing the abusive policies and actions of the People's Republic of China in Tibet. This became known as the 70,000 Character Petition. According to Isabel Hilton, it remains the "most detailed and informed attack on China's policies in Tibet that would ever be written."

The Panchen Lama met with Zhou Enlai to discuss the petition he had written. The initial reaction was positive, but in October 1962, the PRC authorities dealing with the population criticized the petition. Chairman Mao called the petition "... a poisoned arrow shot at the Party by reactionary feudal overlords."

For decades, the content of this report remained hidden from all but the very highest levels of the Chinese leadership, until one copy surfaced in 1996. In January 1998, upon the occasion of the 60th anniversary of the birth of the Tenth Panchen Lama, an English translation by Tibet expert Robert Barnett entitled A Poisoned Arrow: The Secret Report of the 10th Panchen Lama, was published.

=== Arrest ===
In 1964, he was publicly humiliated at Politburo meetings, dismissed from all posts of authority, declared 'an enemy of the Tibetan people', had his dream journal confiscated and used against him, and was then imprisoned. He was 26 years old at the time. The Panchen's situation worsened when the Cultural Revolution began. The Chinese dissident and former Red Guard Wei Jingsheng published in March 1979 a letter under his name but written by another, anonymous, author denouncing the conditions at Qincheng Prison, where the 10th Panchen Lama was imprisoned. In October 1977 he was released, but held under house arrest in Beijing until 1982.

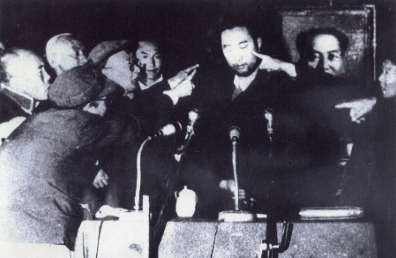
The Tibetan Panchen Lama during a struggle session, 1964.

== Later life ==
In 1978, after giving up his vows of an ordained monk, he travelled around China, looking for a wife to start a family. He began courting Li Jie, uterine granddaughter of Dong Qiwu, a general in PLA who had commanded an Army in the Korean War. She was a medical student at Fourth Military Medical University in Xi'an. At the time, the Lama had no money and was still blacklisted by the party, but the wife of Deng Xiaoping and widow of Zhou Enlai saw the symbolic value of a marriage between a Tibetan Lama and a Han woman. They personally intervened to wed the couple in a large ceremony at the Great Hall of the People in 1979. One year later, the Panchen Lama was given the Vice Chairmanship of the National People's Congress and other political posts, and he was fully politically rehabilitated by 1982.

=== Daughter ===
Li Jie bore a daughter in 1983, named Yabshi Pan Rinzinwangmo (Standard Tibetan: ཡབ་གཞིས་པན་རིག་འཛིན་དབང་མོ་, romanized: yab gzhis pan rig 'dzin dbang mo). Popularly known as the "Princess of Tibet", she is considered important in Tibetan Buddhism and Tibetan-Chinese politics, as she is the only known offspring in the over 620-year history of either the Panchen Lama or Dalai Lama reincarnation lineages.

Of her father's death, Rinzinwangmo reportedly refused to comment, allegedly attributing his early death to his generally poor health, morbid obesity, and chronic sleep deprivation. The 10th Panchen Lama's death sparked a six-year dispute over his assets amounting to $20 million between his wife and daughter and Tashilhunpo Monastery.

== Return to Tibet ==
The Panchen Lama made several journeys to Tibet from Beijing, during 1980 and afterwards.

While touring eastern Tibet in 1980, the Panchen Lama also visited the famous Nyingma school master Khenchen Jigme Phuntsok at Larung Gar.

In 1987, the Panchen Lama met Khenchen Jigme Phuntsok again in Beijing, bestowed the teaching of the Thirty-Seven Practices of a Bodhisattva, and blessed as well as endorsed Larung Gar and conferred its name as Serta Larung Ngarik Nangten Lobling (gser rta bla rung lnga rig nang bstan blob gling), commonly translated as Serta Larung Five Science Buddhist Academy.

With the Panchen Lama's invitation, Khenchen Jigme Phuntsok joined him in 1988 on a consecration ritual in central Tibet, which became a monumental pilgrimage of sacred Buddhist sites in Tibet, among them the Potala Palace, the Norbulingka, the Nechung Monastery, then to Sakya Monastery and Tashilhunpo Monastery, and also to Samye Monastery.

Also in 1987, the Panchen Lama established a business called the Tibet Gang-gyen Development Corporation, envisioned for the future of Tibet whereby Tibetans could take the initiative to develop and join in their own modernization. Plans to rebuild sacred Buddhist sites destroyed in Tibet during 1959 and after were included. Gyara Tsering Samdrup worked with the business, but was arrested in May 1995 after the 11th Panchen Lama Gedhun Choekyi Nyima was recognized.

Early in 1989, the 10th Panchen Lama returned again to Tibet to rebury recovered bones from the graves of the previous Panchen Lamas, graves that had been destroyed at Tashilhunpo Monastery in 1959 by the Red Guards, and consecrated in a chorten built as the receptacle.

On 23 January 1989, the Panchen Lama delivered a speech in Tibet in which he said: "Since liberation, there has certainly been development, but the price paid for this development has been greater than the gains." He criticized the excesses of the Cultural Revolution in Tibet and praised the reform and opening up of the 1980s.

== Death ==
Five days later, on 28 January, the Panchen Lama died in Shigatse, aged 50. Although the official cause of death was said to have been from a heart attack, some Tibetans suspect foul play.

Many theories spread among Tibetans about the Panchen Lama's death. According to one story, he foresaw his own death in a message to his wife on their last meeting. In another, a rainbow appeared in the sky before his death. Other people, including the Dalai Lama, believe that he was poisoned by his own medical staff. Supporters of this theory cite remarks the Panchen Lama made on 23 January to high-ranking officials and that were published in the People's Daily and the China Daily.

In August 1993, his body was moved to Tashi Lhunpo Monastery where his body was first put in a sandalwood bier, which was then put into a specially made safety cabinet and finally moved into the Precious Bottle in the stupa of the monastery where it remains preserved.

In 2011, Chinese dissident Yuan Hongbing declared that Hu Jintao, then the Communist Party Secretary of Tibet and the Political Commissar of the PLA's Tibet units, had masterminded the death of the 10th Panchen Lama.

According to the state-run People's Daily, the Dalai Lama was invited by the Buddhist Association of China to attend the Panchen Lama's funeral and to take the opportunity to contact Tibet's religious communities. The Dalai Lama was unable to attend the funeral.

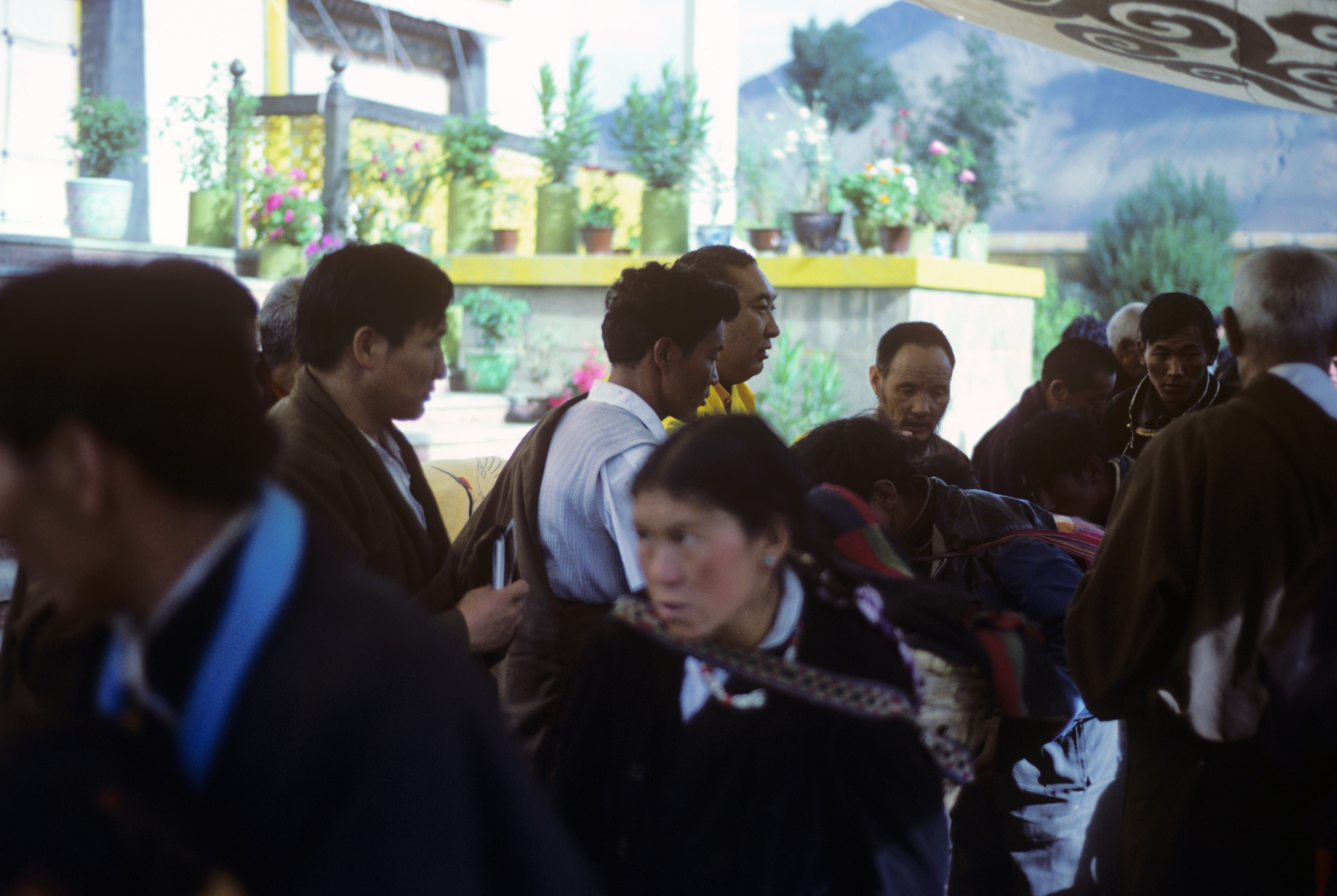
The 10th Panchen Lama visited Tibet in August 1987, and thousands of Tibetans walked for days to line up and receive a blessing.

== See also ==
- Panchen Lama
- History of Tibet (1950–present)
  - Protests and uprisings in Tibet since 1950
  - 14th Dalai Lama

Government offices
Preceded by Tenzin Gyatso, 14th Dalai Lama as Director (fled to India during the 1959 rebellion)	Director of the Preparatory Committee for the Tibet Autonomous Region; Acting; 1959–1964	Succeeded by Ngapoi Ngawang Jigme as Acting Director
Religious titles
Preceded by Thubten Choekyi Nyima, 9th Panchen Lama	Reincarnation of the Panchen Lama; 10th 1949–1989	Succeeded by Gedhun Choekyi Nyima (Government of Tibet in Exile interpretation) Gyaltsen Norbu (People's Republic of China interpretation)
