= Hanzhong Xiguan Airport =

Hanzhong Xiguan Airport 汉中西关机场
- IATA: HZG; ICAO: ZLHZ

Summary
- Airport type: Public
- Operator: Hanzhong Airport Co. Ltd.
- Location: Hanzhong, Shaanxi
- Coordinates: 33°03′49″N 107°00′29″E
- Website: www.cwag-hz.com
- Interactive map of Hanzhong Xiguan Airport

Runways
Direction	Length		Surface
Direction	m	ft	Surface
13/31	1,800	5,906	Asphalt

Hanzhong Xiguan Airport
- Simplified Chinese: 汉中西关机场
- Traditional Chinese: 漢中西關機場
Transcriptions
Standard Mandarin
- Hanyu Pinyin: Hànzhōng Xīguān Jīcháng

Hanzhong Xiguan Airport (Chinese: 汉中西关机场) is the airport formerly serving the city of Hanzhong in Shaanxi Province, China. It is located only 2 kilometers from the city center, which severely limits its expansion possibilities. As a result, Hanzhong Chenggu Airport, a military air base located in Chenggu County northeast of the city, was converted to a dual-use airport, and replaced Xiguan Airport when it was opened on 13 August 2014.

== History ==
The airport was first built in June 1937 by the Republic of China government, to replace a smaller airport that was completed only 4 years before. It was called Nancheng Airfield (南鄭機場), as the city of Hanzhong was then known as Nancheng (now romanized as Nanzheng) County. On 13 March 1938, the airport was bombed by the Japanese, and was closed until March 1939.

During World War II, the airport was known as Hanchung (Nancheng) Airfield and was used by the United States Army Air Forces Fourteenth Air Force as part of the China Defensive Campaign (1942–1945). It was used by the Americans as a photo-reconnaissance base for unarmed P-38 Lightning aerial reconnaissance planes, which flew over Japanese-held territory gathering intelligence for the Chinese ground forces. In addition, the Chinese-American Composite Wing 3d Bomb Group flew B-25 Mitchell medium bombers from the airport in 1944. The Americans closed their facilities at the end of the war in September 1945.

The airport served as a military air base until civil services began in 1974.

== Facilities ==
The airport has a runway that is 1,800 meters long and 30 meters wide (class 3C), and a 600-meter terminal building.

== See also ==
- List of airports in China
- List of the busiest airports in China
