= Lhari Town =

Lhari
- Town
- Location within Tibet Autonomous Region
- Coordinates: 30°44′N 93°19′E
- Country: China
- Region: Tibet
- Prefecture: Nagqu Prefecture
- County: Lhari County

Population (2004)
  - Total: 1,000
  - Major Nationalities: Tibetan
  - Regional dialect: Tibetan language
- Time zone: +8

Lhari (Chinese: 嘉黎镇) is a small town and seat of Lhari County in the Nagqu Prefecture of the Tibet Autonomous Region, in China. It is located northeast of Lhasa, southeast of Nagchu Town, southwest of Banbar Town and north of Gongbo'gyamda. In 2004 it had a population of about 1,000.

== Administrative divisions ==
The township-level division contains the following villages:

- Niureduo Village (扭热朵村)
- Aqiong Village (阿琼村)
- Riwaduo Village (日瓦朵村)
- Benda Village (奔达村)
- Saqinlong Village (萨钦隆村)
- Qietang Village (切塘村)
- Matang Village (玛塘村)
- Yatang Village (亚塘村)
- Yueqing Village (约青村)
- Guoruoka Village (郭若咔村)
- Bangbu Village (帮布村)
- Puye Village (普叶村)
- Yaqing Village (亚庆村)
- Dongduo Village (东多村)
- Lari Village (拉日村)

== See also ==
- List of towns and villages in Tibet
