= Nagqu Town =

Nagqu 那曲镇 · ནག་ཆུ་གྲོང་རྡལ།
- Town
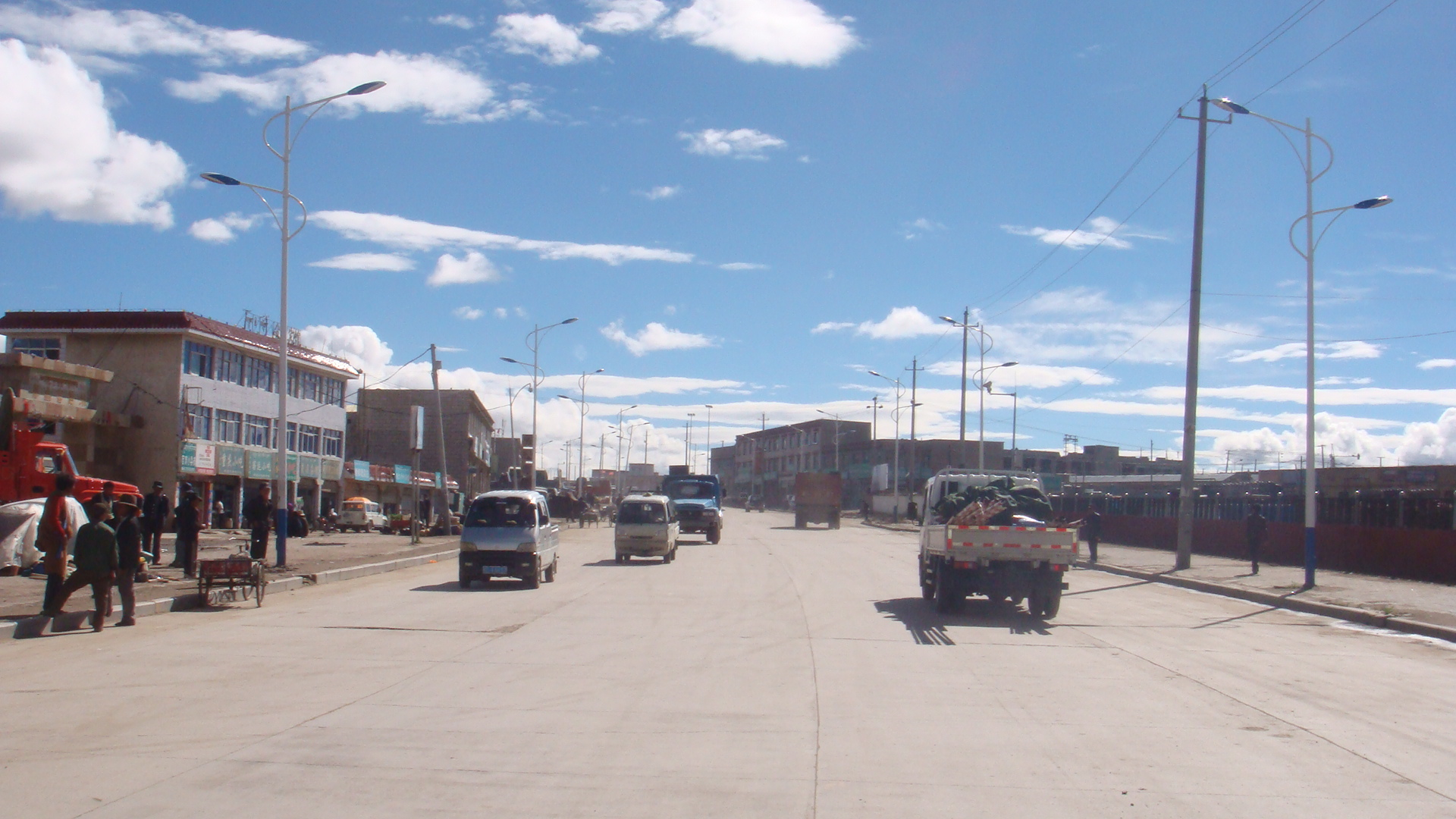
- Nagqu

- Location within Tibet
- Coordinates: 31°29′N 92°03′E
- Country: People's Republic of China
- Autonomous region: Tibet
- Prefecture-level city: Nagqu
- District: Seni
- Elevation: 4,526 m (14,849 ft)
- Time zone: UTC+8 (CST)

Nagqu, Nagchu in original Tibetan or Naqu (Chinese: 那曲; pinyin: Nàqū), also known as Nagchuka or Nagquka, is a town in northern Tibet, seat of the prefecture-level city of Nagqu, approximately 328 km (204 mi) by road north-east of the capital Lhasa, within the Tibet Autonomous Region.

Nagqu railway station to the town's west sits on the Qingzang railway at 4,526 m (14,849 ft). "Nagchu (...) is an important stop on both the road and railway line between Qīnghǎi and Tibet. In fact, this is where Hwy 317 ends as it joins the Qīnghǎi–Tibet Hwy (Hwy 109) on its way to Lhasa."

At the time of the visit in 1950 of Thubten Jigme Norbu, the elder brother of Tenzin Gyatso the 14th Dalai Lama, Nagchukha was a small town with only a few clay huts but was also the headquarters of the District Officer, the Dzongpön. It was on the main caravan route coming from Amdo to Central Tibet.

In 2010 China announced plans to build the highest airport in the world at Nagqu, at an altitude of 4,436 m (14,554 ft), but construction of the airport has faced repeated delays.

With all months having a mean temperature below 10 °C or 50 °F, due to the town's very high altitude, Nagqu has an alpine climate (Köppen: ET), with long, very cold and dry winters, and short, cool summers.

Climate data for Nagchu, Elevation = 4,505 metres or 14,780 feet
Month	Jan	Feb	Mar	Apr	May	Jun	Jul	Aug	Sep	Oct	Nov	Dec	Year
Mean daily maximum °C (°F)	−2 (28)	−1 (30)	2 (36)	6 (43)	10 (50)	14 (57)	15 (59)	14 (57)	12 (54)	7 (45)	1 (34)	−2 (28)	6 (43)
Daily mean °C (°F)	−13 (9)	−10 (14)	−6 (21)	−1 (30)	3 (37)	7 (45)	9 (48)	8 (46)	5 (41)	0 (32)	−7 (19)	−11 (12)	−1 (30)
Mean daily minimum °C (°F)	−22 (−8)	−19 (−2)	−14 (7)	−9 (16)	−3 (27)	0 (32)	3 (37)	2 (36)	0 (32)	−6 (21)	−15 (5)	−21 (−6)	−8 (18)
Average precipitation mm (inches)	2 (0.1)	2 (0.1)	3 (0.1)	10 (0.4)	26 (1.0)	82 (3.2)	106 (4.2)	94 (3.7)	69 (2.7)	20 (0.8)	3 (0.1)	3 (0.1)	420 (16.5)
Source: weatherbase.com
