= Lhari County =

Lhari County 嘉黎县 • ལྷ་རི་རྫོང་།
- County
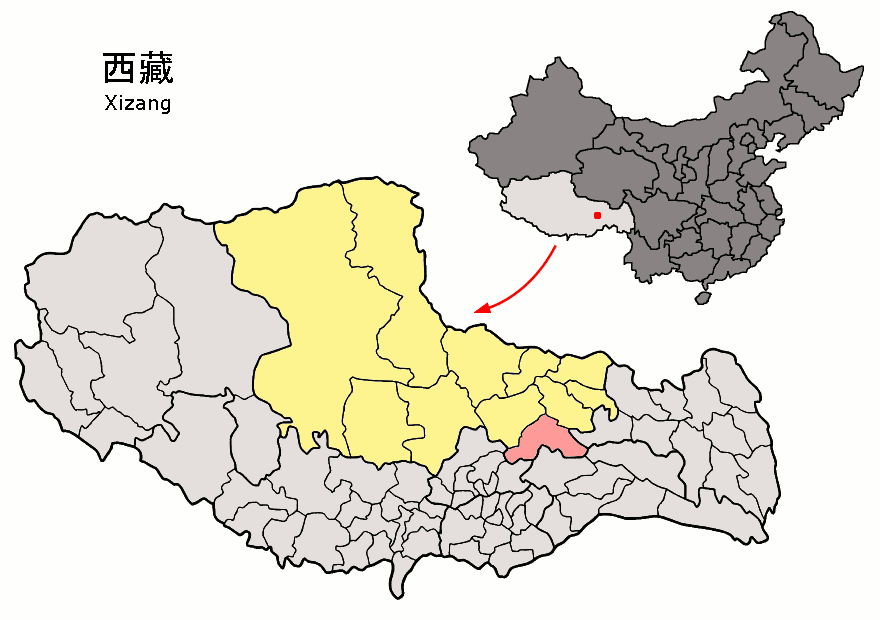
- Location of Lhari County (red) within Nagqu City (yellow) and the Tibet Autonomous Region

- Location of the seat in the Tibet Autonomous Region Lhari (China)
- Coordinates: 31°05′22″N 92°54′02″E
- Country: China
- Autonomous Region: Tibet
- Prefecture-level city: Nagqu
- County seat: Arza

Area
  - Total: 13,068.68 km^{2} (5,045.85 sq mi)

Population (2020)
  - Total: 38,797
  - Density: 2.9687/km^{2} (7.6889/sq mi)
- Time zone: UTC+8 (China Standard)
- Website: www.xzjial.gov.cn

Lhari County

Chinese name
- Simplified Chinese: 嘉黎县
- Traditional Chinese: 嘉黎縣
Transcriptions
Standard Mandarin
- Hanyu Pinyin: Jiālí Xiàn

Tibetan name
- Tibetan: ལྷ་རི་རྫོང་།
Transcriptions
- Wylie: lha ri rdzong
- Tibetan Pinyin: Lhari Zong

Lhari County (Tibetan: ལྷ་རི་རྫོང་།; Chinese: 嘉黎县) is a small county within the prefecture-level city of Nagqu in the Tibet Autonomous Region, China.

The 11th Dalai Lama was born in Lhari County, as were both of the rival candidates for the position of the current Panchen Lama.

== Administrative divisions ==
The county contains the following 2 towns and 8 townships:

Name	Chinese	Hanyu Pinyin	Tibetan	Wylie
Towns
Arza Town	阿扎镇	Ãzhā zhèn	ཨར་རྩ་གྲོང་རྡལ།	ar rtsa grong rdal
Lhari Town	嘉黎镇	Jiālí zhèn	ལྷ་རི་་གྲོང་རྡལ།	lha ri grong rdal
Townships
Nyiwu Township (Drongyül)	尼屋乡	Níwū xiāng	སྙིའུ་ཤང་།	snyi'u shang
Dzabbel Township (Zabbe)	藏比乡	Zàngbǐ xiāng	རྫབ་འབེལ་ཤང་།	rdzab 'bel shang
Codoi Township	措多乡	Cuòduō xiāng	ཚོ་སྟོད་ཤང་།	tsho stod shang
Xarma Township	夏玛乡	Xiàmǎ xiāng	ཤར་མ་ཤང་།	shar ma shang
Lingti Township	林堤乡	Líndī xiāng	གླིང་མཐིལ་ཤང་།	gling mthil shang
Mitika Township (Midikha, Cora, Tsora)	麦地卡乡	Màidìkǎ xiāng	སྨི་ཏི་ཁ་ཤང་།	smi ti kha shang
Rongdoi Township (Rongtö)	绒多乡	Róngduō xiāng	རོང་སྟོད་ཤང་།	rong stod shang
Goqung Township (Kochung)	鸽群乡	Gēqún xiāng	ཀོ་ཆུང་ཤང་།	ko chung shang

== Climate ==
Climate data for Lhari, elevation 4,489 m (14,728 ft), (1991–2020 normals, extremes 1991–present)
Month	Jan	Feb	Mar	Apr	May	Jun	Jul	Aug	Sep	Oct	Nov	Dec	Year
Record high °C (°F)	12.1 (53.8)	11.6 (52.9)	16.8 (62.2)	18.5 (65.3)	19.0 (66.2)	21.0 (69.8)	23.0 (73.4)	22.4 (72.3)	20.6 (69.1)	17.8 (64.0)	13.3 (55.9)	13.2 (55.8)	23.0 (73.4)
Mean daily maximum °C (°F)	−1.1 (30.0)	0.5 (32.9)	3.1 (37.6)	6.8 (44.2)	10.8 (51.4)	14.8 (58.6)	16.1 (61.0)	15.9 (60.6)	13.9 (57.0)	9.1 (48.4)	4.0 (39.2)	1.0 (33.8)	7.9 (46.2)
Daily mean °C (°F)	−10.1 (13.8)	−7.9 (17.8)	−4.2 (24.4)	−0.3 (31.5)	3.8 (38.8)	7.7 (45.9)	9.1 (48.4)	8.6 (47.5)	6.5 (43.7)	1.6 (34.9)	−4.8 (23.4)	−8.6 (16.5)	0.1 (32.2)
Mean daily minimum °C (°F)	−17.9 (−0.2)	−15.4 (4.3)	−10.2 (13.6)	−5.6 (21.9)	−1.2 (29.8)	2.7 (36.9)	4.2 (39.6)	3.8 (38.8)	1.8 (35.2)	−3.5 (25.7)	−11.4 (11.5)	−16.5 (2.3)	−5.8 (21.6)
Record low °C (°F)	−29.8 (−21.6)	−31.1 (−24.0)	−27.2 (−17.0)	−15.4 (4.3)	−10.1 (13.8)	−5.0 (23.0)	−3.3 (26.1)	−4.0 (24.8)	−6.9 (19.6)	−17.1 (1.2)	−24.2 (−11.6)	−30.2 (−22.4)	−31.1 (−24.0)
Average precipitation mm (inches)	7.5 (0.30)	12.6 (0.50)	24.1 (0.95)	38.5 (1.52)	83.0 (3.27)	152.1 (5.99)	153.6 (6.05)	132.6 (5.22)	111.2 (4.38)	37.9 (1.49)	11.3 (0.44)	5.1 (0.20)	769.5 (30.31)
Average precipitation days (≥ 0.1 mm)	7.2	8.6	13.2	15.5	19.2	23.1	23.8	22.0	20.5	13.1	5.9	4.1	176.2
Average snowy days	11.6	12.8	18.2	20.4	20.7	6.9	1.2	1.5	6.7	16.8	9.4	8.0	134.2
Average relative humidity (%)	49	49	54	59	64	69	72	73	72	63	53	48	60
Mean monthly sunshine hours	209.1	196.0	218.4	214.7	224.0	190.8	174.1	181.7	187.8	228.5	227.9	219.2	2,472.2
Percentage possible sunshine	65	62	58	55	53	45	41	45	51	66	72	70	57
Source: China Meteorological Administration all-time extreme temperature

== Gallery ==
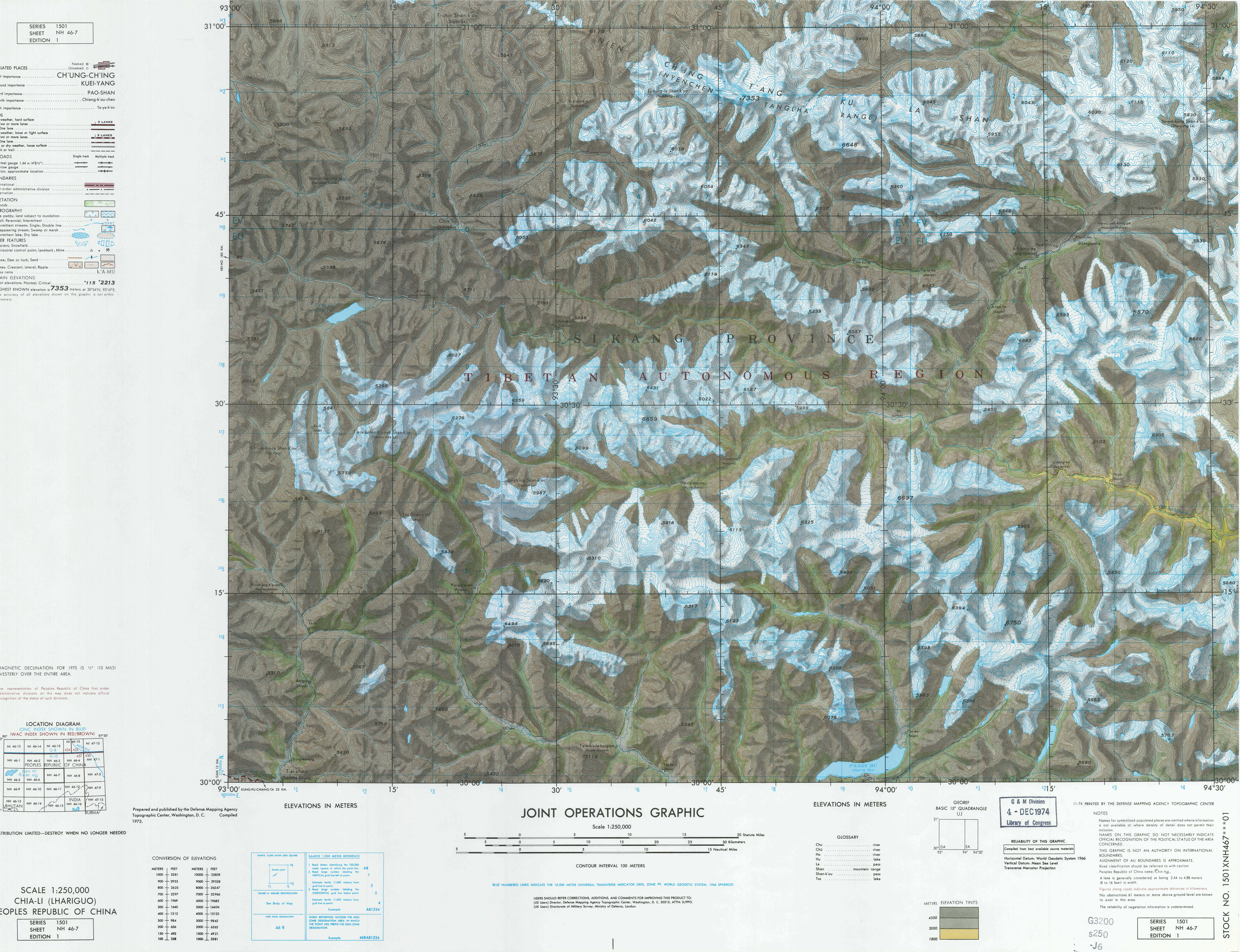
