= Dalai Lama =

Head of the Gelug school of Tibetan Buddhism

- ཏཱ་ལའི་བླ་མ་
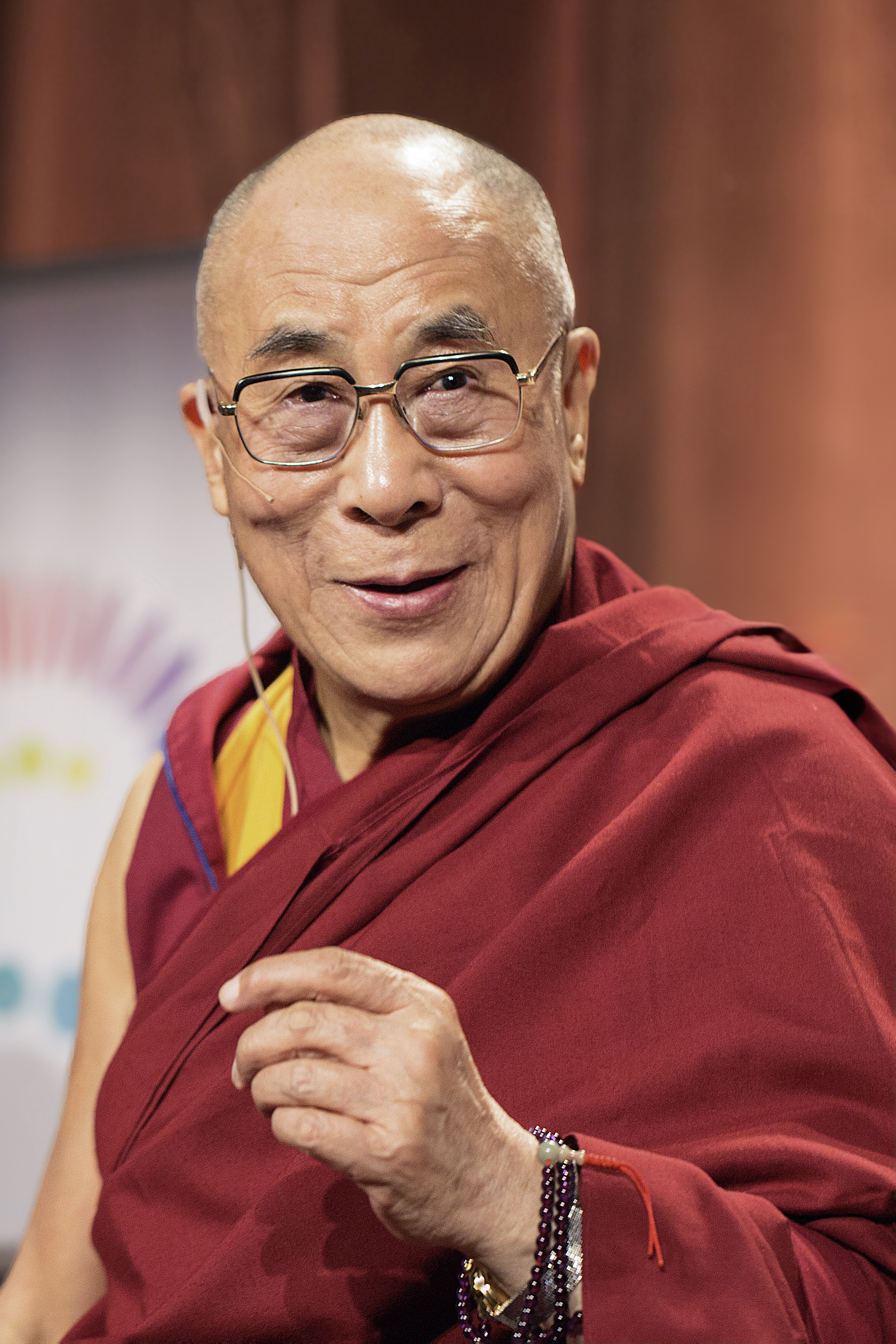
- Incumbent; Tenzin Gyatso, 14th Dalai Lama since 22 February 1940
- Residence: McLeod Ganj, Dharamshala, India (1959–present); Potala Palace (1649–1959, winter residence); Norbulingka (1783–1959, summer residence)
- Formation: 1391; 635 years ago
- First holder: Gendün Drubpa, 1st Dalai Lama (posthumously awarded after 1578)
- Website: dalailama.com

The Dalai Lama (UK: /ˈdælaɪ ˈlɑːmə/, US: /ˈdɑːlaɪ/; Tibetan: ཏཱ་ལའི་བླ་མ་, Wylie: Tā la'i bla ma [táːlɛː láma]) is the spiritual head of Tibetan Buddhism. The term is part of the full title "Holiness Knowing Everything Vajradhara Dalai Lama". It was given in 1578 by the Tümed leader Altan Khan to the Gelug school's then-leader, Sonam Gyatso, at Yanghua Monastery. Sonam Gyatso became the 3rd Dalai Lama, while the first two tulkus in his lineage, the 1st Dalai Lama and the 2nd Dalai Lama, were posthumously awarded the title. Since the time of the 5th Dalai Lama (1642–1682), the Dalai Lama has been considered a symbol of statehood of Tibet. From 1642 to 1951, the Dalai Lama or their Kalons (regents) led the secular government of Tibet in Lhasa, known as the Ganden Phodrang.

Initially Dalai Lama administered Tibet under control of Khoshut Khanate (1642–1717), which provided protection to Ganden Phodrang government. After the Chinese expedition to Tibet (1720), the Ganden Phodrang officially functioned as a protectorate under Qing Chinese rule and governed all of the Tibetan Plateau while having varying degrees of autonomy. After the Qing dynasty collapsed in 1912, the 13th Dalai Lama issued a proclamation declaring that Tibet's relationship with China had ended with the Qing dynasty's fall. However, Republic of China (ROC) continued to claim succession over all former Qing territories, including Tibet.

In 1951, the 14th Dalai Lama ratified the Seventeen Point Agreement with China. In 1959, he revoked the agreement. He initially supported the Tibetan independence movement, but in 1974, he rejected calls for Tibetan independence, agreeing publicly in 2005 that Tibet is part of China. The 14th Dalai Lama has become a symbol of Tibetan nationhood for Tibetans in Tibet and in exile, after escaping from Lhasa during the 1959 Tibetan uprising, and currently lives in exile in Dharamshala, India. According to Tibetan Buddhist doctrine, the Dalai Lama chooses his reincarnation. In recent years, the 14th Dalai Lama has opposed Chinese government involvement, emphasizing that his reincarnation should not be subject to external political influence.

The extent and nature of the Dalai's secular and religious power during Ganden Phodrang remains contested. One common interpretation is the mchod yon (མཆོད་ཡོན), often translated as "priest and patron relationship", in which patron provided political protection, and priest legitimacy to their rule, but this interpretation has been criticised as Tibet under Khoshut and Qing rule was subject to external political dominance, and historians such as Melvyn Goldstein have called Tibet a vassal state or tributary. After Qing conquest in 1720, all diplomatic agreements recognized Qing China's sovereign right to negotiate and conclude treaties and trade agreements involving Tibet. Since the 18th century, Chinese authorities have asserted the right to oversee the selection of Tibetan spiritual leaders, including the Dalai and Panchen Lamas. This practice was formalized in 1793 through the 29-Article Ordinance for the More Effective Governing of Tibet.

== Names ==
"Dalai Lama" is part of the full title "圣 识一切 瓦齐尔达喇 达赖 喇嘛" ("Holiness Knowing Everything Vajradhara Dalai Lama") given by Altan Khan. "Dalai Lama" combines the Mongolic word dalai ('ocean') and the Tibetan word བླ་མ་ (bla-ma) ('master, guru'). The word dalai corresponds to the Tibetan word gyatso or rgya-mtsho, and, according to Schwieger, was chosen by analogy with the Mongolian title Dalaiyin qan or Dalaiin khan. Others suggest it may have been chosen in reference to the breadth of the Dalai Lama's wisdom. The Dalai Lama is also known in Tibetan as the Rgyal-ba Rin-po-che ('Precious Conqueror') or simply the Rgyal-ba.

== History ==
=== Origins in myth and legend ===
Since the 11th century, it has been widely believed in Central Asian Buddhist countries that Avalokiteśvara, the bodhisattva of compassion, has a special relationship with the people of Tibet and intervenes in their fate by incarnating as benevolent rulers and teachers such as the Dalai Lamas. The Book of Kadam, the main text of the Kadampa school from which the 1st Dalai Lama hailed, is said to have laid the foundation for the Tibetans' later identification of the Dalai Lamas as incarnations of Avalokiteśvara. It traces the legend of the bodhisattva's incarnations as early Tibetan kings and emperors such as Songtsen Gampo and later as Dromtönpa (1004–1064). This lineage has been extrapolated by Tibetans up to and including the Dalai Lamas.

Thus, according to such sources, an informal line of succession of the present Dalai Lamas as incarnations of Avalokiteśvara stretches back much further than the 1st Dalai Lama, Gendun Drub; as many as sixty persons are enumerated as earlier incarnations of Avalokiteśvara and predecessors in the same lineage leading up to Gendun Drub. These earlier incarnations include a mythology of 36 Indian personalities, ten early Tibetan kings and emperors all said to be previous incarnations of Dromtönpa, and fourteen further Nepalese and Tibetan yogis and sages. In fact, according to the "Birth to Exile" article on the 14th Dalai Lama's website, he is "the seventy-fourth in a lineage that can be traced back to a Brahmin boy who lived in the time of Buddha Shakyamuni."

=== Avalokiteśvara's "Dalai Lama master plan" ===
According to the 14th Dalai Lama, long ago Avalokiteśvara had promised the Buddha to guide and defend the Tibetan people. In the late Middle Ages, his master plan to fulfill this promise was the stage-by-stage establishment of the Dalai Lama institution in Tibet.

First, Tsongkhapa established three great monasteries around Lhasa in the province of Ü before he died in 1419. The 1st Dalai Lama soon became Abbot of the greatest one, Drepung, and developed a large popular power base in Ü. He later extended this to cover Tsang, where he constructed a fourth great monastery, Tashi Lhunpo, at Shigatse. The 2nd studied there before returning to Lhasa, where he became Abbot of Drepung. Having reactivated the 1st's large popular followings in Tsang and Ü, the 2nd then moved on to southern Tibet and gathered more followers there who helped him construct a new monastery, Chokorgyel. He established the method by which later Dalai Lama incarnations would be discovered through visions at the "oracle lake", Lhamo Lhatso.

The 3rd built on his predecessors' fame by becoming Abbot of the two great monasteries of Drepung and Sera. The Mongol leader Altan Khan, first Ming Shunyi King, hearing of his reputation, invited the 3rd to Mongolia, where he converted the King and his followers to Buddhism, covering a vast tract of central Asia. This brought most of Mongolia into the Dalai Lama's sphere of influence, founding a spiritual empire which largely survives to the modern age. After being given the Mongolian name 'Dalai', he returned to Tibet to found the great monasteries of Lithang in Kham, eastern Tibet and Kumbum in Amdo, north-eastern Tibet.

The 4th was then born in Mongolia as the great-grandson of Altan Khan, cementing strong ties between Central Asia, the Dalai Lamas, the Gelugpa and Tibet. The 5th in the succession used the vast popular power base of devoted followers built up by his four predecessors. By 1642, with the strategy provided by his chagdzo (manager) Sonam Rapten and the military assistance of Khoshut chieftain Gushri Khan, the 'Great 5th' founded the Dalai Lamas' religious and political reign over Tibet that survived for over 300 years.

=== Establishment of the Dalai Lama lineage ===
Gendun Drup (1391–1474), a disciple of Je Tsongkapa, would eventually be known as the 'First Dalai Lama', but he would not receive this title until 104 years after he died. There was resistance to naming him as such, since he was ordained a monk in the Kadampa tradition and for various reasons, the Kadampa school had eschewed the adoption of the tulku system to which the older schools adhered. Therefore, although Gendun Drup grew to be an important Gelugpa lama, there was no search to identify his incarnation after his death in 1474.

Despite this, 55 years after Tsongkhapa, the Tashilhunpo monks heard accounts that an incarnation of Gendun Drup had appeared nearby and repeatedly announced himself from the age of two. The monastic authorities saw compelling evidence that convinced them the child in question was indeed the incarnation of their founder and felt obliged to break with their own tradition, and in 1487, the boy was renamed Gendun Gyatso and installed at Tashilhunpo as Gendun Drup's tulku, albeit informally.

Gendun Gyatso died in 1542, but the lineage of Dalai Lama tulkus became firmly established with the third incarnation, Sonam Gyatso (1543–1588), who was formally recognised and enthroned at Drepung in 1546. Sonam Gyatso was given the title "Dalai Lama" by the Tümed Altan Khan in 1578, and his two predecessors were then accorded the title posthumously, making Sonam now the third in the lineage.

=== 1st Dalai Lama ===
Pema Dorje (1391–1474), who would eventually be posthumously declared the 1st Dalai Lama, was born in a cattle pen in Shabtod, Tsang in 1391. His family were goatherders, but when his father died in 1398, his mother entrusted him to his uncle for education as a Buddhist monk. Pema Dorje was sent to Narthang, a major Kadampa monastery near Shigatse, which ran the largest printing press in Tibet. Its celebrated library attracted many scholars, so Pema Dorje received an education beyond the norm at the time as well as exposure to diverse spiritual schools and ideas.

He studied Buddhist philosophy extensively. In 1405, ordained by Narthang's abbot, he took the name of Gendun Drup. He was recognised as an exceptionally gifted pupil, so the abbot tutored him personally and took special interest in his progress. In twelve years he passed the twelve grades of monkhood and took the highest vows. After completing his intensive studies at Narthang he left to continue at specialist monasteries in Central Tibet.

In 1415, Gendun Drup met Tsongkhapa, founder of the Gelugpa school, and became his student. After the death of Tsongkhapa's successor, the Panchen Lama Khedrup Je, Gendun Drup became the leader of the Gelugpa. He rose to become Abbot of Drepung, the greatest Gelugpa monastery outside Lhasa.

It was mainly due to Gendun Drup that Tsongkhapa's new school grew into an order capable of competing with others on an equal footing. Taking advantage of good relations with the nobility and a lack of determined opposition from rival orders, he founded Tashilhunpo Monastery at Shigatse, on the very edge of Karma Kagyu-dominated territory, and would serve as its Abbot until his death. This monastery became the fourth great Gelugpa monastery in Tibet, after Ganden, Drepung, and Sera, all founded in Tsongkhapa's time, and would later become the seat of the Panchen Lamas. By establishing it at Shigatse in the middle of Tsang, Gendun Drup expanded the Gelugpa sphere of influence, and his own, from the Lhasa region of Ü to this province, which was the stronghold of the Karma Kagyu school and their patrons, the rising Tsangpa dynasty. Tashilhunpo eventually became 'Southern Tibet's greatest monastic university' with a complement of 3,000 monks.

Gendun Drup was said to be the greatest scholar-saint ever produced by Narthang Monastery and became 'the single most important lama in Tibet'. Through hard work he became a leading lama, known as 'Perfecter of the Monkhood', 'with a host of disciples'. Famed for his Buddhist scholarship, he was also referred to as Panchen Gendun Drup, 'Panchen' being an honorary title designating 'great scholar'. By the great Jonangpa master Bodong Chokley Namgyal he was accorded the honorary title Tamchey Khyenpa meaning "The Omniscient One", an appellation that was later assigned to all Dalai Lama incarnations.

At the age of 50, he entered meditation retreat at Narthang Monastery. As he grew older, Karma Kagyu adherents, finding their sect was losing too many recruits to burgeoning Gelugpa monasteries, tried to contain Gelug expansion by launching military expeditions against them. This led to decades of military and political power struggles between Tsangpa dynasty forces and others across central Tibet. In an attempt to ameliorate these clashes, Gendun Drup issued a poem of advice to his followers advising restraint from responding to violence with more violence and urged compassion and patience instead. The poem, titled Shar Gang Rima ("The Song of the Eastern Snow Mountains"), became one of his most enduring popular literary works.

Gendun Drup's spiritual accomplishments brought him substantial donations from devotees which he used to build and furnish new monasteries, as well as to print and distribute Buddhist texts and to maintain monks and meditators. In 1474, at the age of 84, he went on a final teaching tour by foot to visit Narthang Monastery. Returning to Tashilhunpo he died "in a blaze of glory, recognised as having attained Buddhahood".

His remains were interred in a bejewelled silver stupa at Tashi Lhunpo Monastery, which survived the Cultural Revolution and can still be seen.

=== 2nd Dalai Lama ===
After Gendun Drup died, a boy called Sangyey Pel, born to Nyngma adepts at Yolkar in Tsang, declared himself at the age of three to be Gendun Drup and asked to be 'taken home' to Tashilhunpo. He spoke in mystical verses, quoted classical texts spontaneously, and claimed to be Dromtönpa, an earlier incarnation of the Dalai Lamas. When he saw monks from Tashilhunpo, he greeted the disciples of the late Gendun Drup by name. Convinced by the evidence, the Gelugpa elders broke with the traditions of their school and recognised him as Gendun Drup's tulku at the age of eight.

His father took him on teachings and retreats, training him in all the family Nyingma lineages. At twelve he was installed at Tashilhunpo as Gendun Drup's incarnation, ordained, enthroned, and renamed Gendun Gyatso Palzangpo (1475–1542).

Tutored personally by the abbot, he made rapid progress, and in 1492 at the age of seventeen he was requested to teach all over Tsang, where thousands gathered to listen and give obeisance, including senior scholars and abbots. Two years later, he met some opposition from the Tashilhunpo establishment when tensions arose over conflicts between advocates of the two types of succession: the traditional abbatial election through merit and incarnation. He therefore moved to central Tibet, where he was invited to Drepung and where his reputation as a brilliant young teacher quickly grew. This move had the effect of shifting central Gelug authority back to Lhasa.

He was afforded all the loyalty and devotion that Gendun Drup had earned and the Gelug school remained as united as ever. Under his leadership, the sect continued growing in size and influence and its lamas were asked to mediate in disputes between other rivals. Gendun Gyatso's popularity in Ü-Tsang grew as he went on pilgrimage, teaching and studying from masters such as the adept Khedrup Norzang Gyatso in the Olklha mountains. He also stayed in Kongpo and Dagpo and became known all over Tibet. He spent his winters in Lhasa, writing commentaries, and spent the rest of the year travelling and teaching many thousands of monks and laypeople.

In 1509, he moved to southern Tibet to build Chokorgyel Monastery near the 'Oracle Lake', Lhamo Latso, completing it by 1511. That year he saw visions in the lake and 'empowered' it to impart clues to help identify incarnate lamas. All Dalai Lamas from the 3rd on were found with the help of such visions granted to regents. He was invited back to Tashilhunpo and given the residence built for Gendun Drup, to be occupied later by the Panchen Lamas. He was made abbot of Tashilhunpo and stayed there teaching in Tsang for nine months.

Gendun Gyatso continued to travel widely and teach while based at Tibet's largest monastery, Drepung and became known as 'Drepung Lama', his fame and influence spreading all over Central Asia as the best students from hundreds of lesser monasteries in Asia were sent to Drepung for education.

Throughout Gendun Gyatso's life, the Gelugpa were opposed and suppressed by older rivals, particularly the Karma Kagyu and their Ringpung clan patrons from Tsang, who felt threatened by their loss of influence. In 1498, the Ringpung army captured Lhasa and banned the Gelugpa annual New Year Monlam Prayer Festival. Gendun Gyatso was promoted to abbot of Drepung in 1517 and that year Ringpung forces were forced to withdraw from Lhasa. Gendun Gyatso then went to the Gongma (King) Drakpa Jungne to obtain permission for the festival to be held again. The next New Year, the Gongma was so impressed by Gendun Gyatso's performance leading the festival that he sponsored construction of a large new residence for him at Drepung, 'a monastery within a monastery'. It was called the Ganden Phodrang, a name later adopted by the Tibetan Government, and it served as home for Dalai Lamas until the Fifth moved to the Potala Palace in 1645.

In 1525, already abbot of Chokhorgyel, Drepung and Tashilhunpo, he was made abbot of Sera monastery as well, and worked to increase the number of monks there. Based at Drepung in winter and Chokorgyel in summer, he spent his remaining years composing commentaries, making regional teaching tours, visiting Tashilhunpo, and acting as abbot of these four great monasteries. As abbot, he made Drepung the largest monastery in the whole of Tibet. He attracted many students and disciples 'from Kashmir to China' as well as major patrons and disciples such as Gongma Nangso Donyopa of Droda who built a monastery at Zhekar Dzong in his honour and invited him to name it and be its spiritual guide.

Gongma Gyaltsen Palzangpo of Khyomorlungand and his Queen, Sangyey Paldzomma, became his favorite patrons and disciples and he visited their area to carry out rituals as 'he chose it for his next place of rebirth'. He died in meditation at Drepung in 1542 at the age of 67 and his reliquary stupa was constructed at Khyomorlung. It was said that, by the time he died, through his disciples and their students, his personal influence covered the whole of Buddhist Central Asia where 'there was nobody of any consequence who did not know of him.' The Dalai Lama title was posthumously granted to Gedun Gyatso after 1578.

=== 3rd Dalai Lama ===
The Third Dalai Lama, Sonam Gyatso (1543–1588), was born in Tolung, near Lhasa, as predicted by his predecessor. Claiming he was Gendun Gyatso and readily recalling events from his previous life, he was recognised as the incarnation, named 'Sonam Gyatso' and installed at Drepung, where 'he quickly excelled his teachers in knowledge and wisdom and developed extraordinary powers'. Unlike his predecessors, he came from a noble family, connected with the Sakya and the Phagmo Drupa (Karma Kagyu affiliated) dynasties, and it is to him that the effective conversion of Mongolia to Buddhism is due.

A brilliant scholar and teacher, he had the spiritual maturity to be made Abbot of Drepung, taking responsibility for the material and spiritual well-being of Tibet's largest monastery at the age of nine. At 10 he led the Monlam Prayer Festival, giving daily discourses to the assembly of all Gelugpa monks. His influence grew so quickly that soon the monks at Sera Monastery also made him their Abbot and his mediation was being sought to prevent fighting between political power factions. At 16, in 1559, he was invited to Nedong by King Ngawang Tashi Drakpa, a Karma Kagyu supporter, and became his personal teacher.

At 17, when fighting broke out in Lhasa between Gelug and Kagyu parties and efforts by local lamas to mediate failed, Sonam Gyatso negotiated a peaceful settlement. At 19, when the Kyichu River burst its banks and flooded Lhasa, he led his followers to rescue victims and repair the dykes. He then instituted a custom whereby on the last day of Monlam, all the monks would work on strengthening the flood defences. Gradually, he was shaping himself into a national leader. His popularity and renown became such that in 1564 when the Nedong King died, it was Sonam Gyatso at the age of 21 who was requested to lead his funeral rites, rather than his own Kagyu lamas.

Required to travel and teach without respite after taking full ordination in 1565, he still maintained extensive meditation practices in the hours before dawn and again at the end of the day. In 1569, at age 26, he went to Tashilhunpo to study the layout and administration of the monastery built by his predecessor Gendun Drup. Invited to become the Abbot he declined, already being Abbot of Drepung and Sera, but left his deputy there in his stead. From there he visited Narthang, the first monastery of Gendun Drup and gave numerous discourses and offerings to the monks in gratitude.

Meanwhile, Altan Khan, chief of all the Mongol tribes near China's borders, had heard of Sonam Gyatso's spiritual prowess and repeatedly invited him to Mongolia. By 1571, when Altan Khan received a title of Shunyi Wang (King) from the Ming dynasty of China and swore allegiance to Ming, Although he remained de facto quite independent, he had fulfilled his political destiny and a nephew advised him to seek spiritual salvation, saying that "in Tibet dwells Avalokiteshvara", referring to Sonam Gyatso, then 28 years old. China was also happy to help Altan Khan by providing necessary translations of holy scripture, and also lamas.

At the second invitation, in 1577–78 Sonam Gyatso travelled 1,500 miles to Mongolia to see him. They met in an atmosphere of intense reverence and devotion and their meeting resulted in the re-establishment of strong Tibet-Mongolia relations after a gap of 200 years. To Altan Khan, Sonam Gyatso identified himself as the incarnation of Drogön Chögyal Phagpa, and Altan Khan as that of Kubilai Khan, thus placing the Khan as heir to the Chingizid lineage whilst securing his patronage. Altan Khan and his followers quickly adopted Buddhism as their state religion, replacing the prohibited traditional Shamanism.

Mongol law was reformed to accord with Tibetan Buddhist law. From this time Buddhism spread rapidly across Mongolia and soon the Gelugpa had won the spiritual allegiance of most of the Mongolian tribes. As proposed by Sonam Gyatso, Altan Khan sponsored the building of Thegchen Chonkhor Monastery at the site of Sonam Gyatso's open-air teachings given to the whole Mongol population. He also called Sonam Gyatso "Dalai", Mongolian for 'Gyatso' (Ocean).

The name "Dalai Lama", by which the lineage later became known throughout the non-Tibetan world, was thus established and it was applied to the first two incarnations retrospectively.

In 1579, the Ming allowed the third Dalai Lama to pay regular tribute. Returning eventually to Tibet by a roundabout route and invited to stay and teach all along the way, in 1580 Sonam Gyatso was in Hohhot [or Ningxia], not far from Beijing, when the Chinese Emperor summoned him to his court. By then he had established a religious empire of such proportions that it was unsurprising the Emperor wanted to summon him and grant him a diploma.

Through Altan Khan, the 3rd Dalai Lama requested to pay tribute to the Emperor of China in order to raise his State Tutor ranking, and the Ming imperial court of China agreed with the request. In 1582, he heard Altan Khan had died and invited by his son Dhüring Khan he decided to return to Mongolia. Passing through Amdo, he founded a second great monastery, Kumbum, at the birthplace of Tsongkhapa near Kokonor. Further on, he was asked to adjudicate on border disputes between Mongolia and China. It was the first time a Dalai Lama had exercised such political authority.

Arriving in Mongolia in 1585, he stayed 2 years with Dhüring Khan, teaching Buddhism to his people and converting more Mongol princes and their tribes. Receiving a second invitation from the Emperor in Beijing he accepted, but died en route in 1588. As he was dying, his Mongolian converts urged him not to leave them, as they needed his continuing religious leadership. He promised them he would be incarnated next in Mongolia, as a Mongolian.

=== 4th Dalai Lama ===
The Fourth Dalai Lama, Yonten Gyatso (1589–1617) was a Mongol, the great-grandson of Altan Khan who was a descendant of Kublai Khan and leader of the Tümed Mongols who had already been converted to Buddhism by the Third Dalai Lama, Sonam Gyatso (1543–1588). This strong connection caused the Mongols to zealously support the Gelugpa sect in Tibet, strengthening their status and position but also arousing intensified opposition from the Gelugpa's rivals, particularly the Tsang Karma Kagyu in Shigatse and their Mongol patrons and the Bönpo in Kham and their allies. Being the newest school, unlike the older schools the Gelugpa lacked an established network of Tibetan clan patronage and were thus more reliant on foreign patrons.

At the age of 10 with a large Mongol escort he travelled to Lhasa where he was enthroned. He studied at Drepung and became its abbot but being a non-Tibetan he met with opposition from some Tibetans, especially the Karma Kagyu who felt their position was threatened by these emerging events; there were several attempts to remove him from power. Seal of authority was granted in 1616 by Wanli Emperor of Ming. Yonten Gyatso died at the age of 27 under suspicious circumstances and his chief attendant Sonam Rapten went on to discover the 5th Dalai Lama, became his chagdzo or manager and after 1642 he went on to be his regent, the Desi.

=== 5th Dalai Lama ===
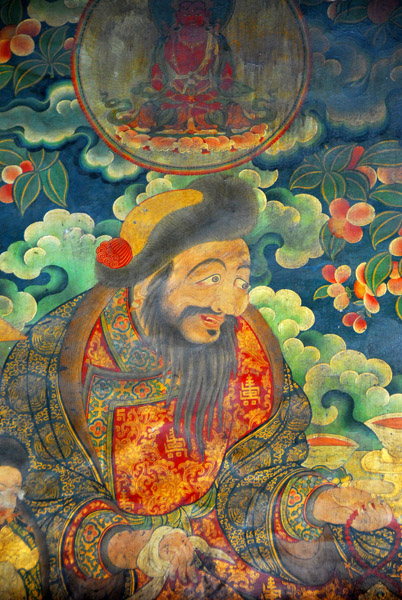
Güshi Khan

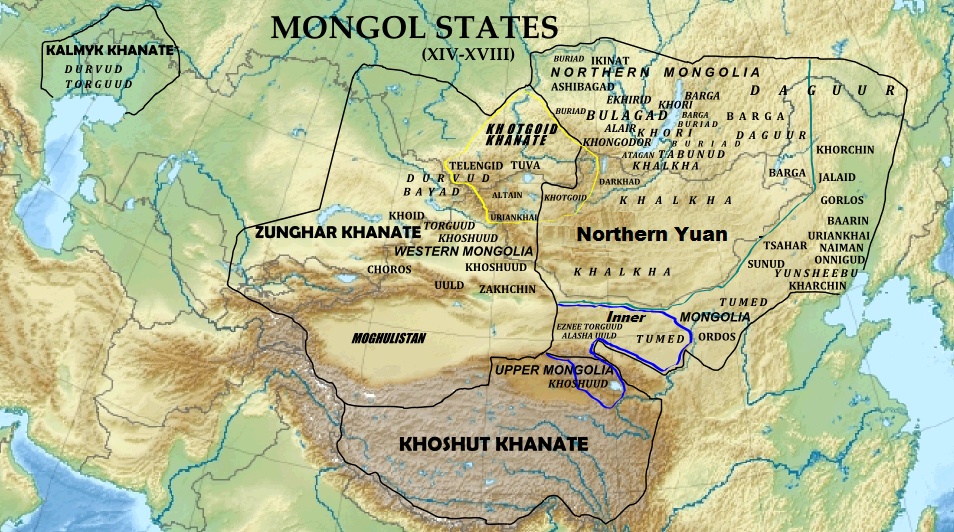
Map showing the extent of the Khoshut Khanate, 1642–1717, after the Unification of Tibet under the 5th Dalai Lama with Sonam Chöphel and Güshi Khan

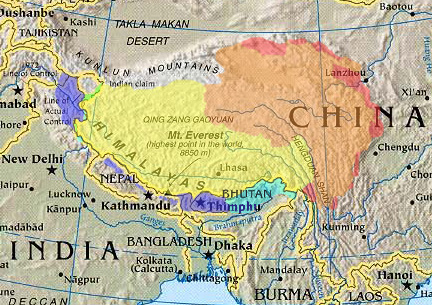
'Greater Tibet' as claimed by exiled groups

The death of the Fourth Dalai Lama in 1617 led to open conflict breaking out between various parties. First, the Tsangpa dynasty, rulers of Central Tibet from Shigatse, supporters of the Karmapa school and rivals to the Gelugpa, forbade the search for his incarnation. But in 1618, Sonam Rapten, the former attendant of the 4th Dalai Lama who had become the Ganden Phodrang treasurer, secretly identified the child, who had been born to the noble Zahor family at Tagtse castle, south of Lhasa. Then, the Panchen Lama, in Shigatse, negotiated the lifting of the ban, enabling the boy to be recognised as Lobsang Gyatso, the 5th Dalai Lama.

Also in 1618, the Tsangpa King, Karma Puntsok Namgyal, whose Mongol patron was Choghtu Khong Tayiji of the Khalkha Mongols, attacked the Gelugpa in Lhasa to avenge an earlier snub and established two military bases there to control the monasteries and the city. This caused Sonam Rabten who became the 5th Dalai Lama's changdzo or manager, to seek more active Mongol patronage and military assistance for the Gelugpa while the Fifth was still a boy. So, in 1620, Mongol troops allied to the Gelugpa who had camped outside Lhasa suddenly attacked and destroyed the two Tsangpa camps and drove them out of Lhasa, enabling the Dalai Lama to be brought out of hiding and publicly enthroned there in 1622.

In fact, throughout the 5th's minority, it was the influential and forceful Sonam Rabten who inspired the Dzungar Mongols to defend the Gelugpa by attacking their enemies. These enemies included other Mongol tribes who supported the Tsangpas, the Tsangpa themselves and their Bönpo allies in Kham who had also opposed and persecuted Gelugpas. Ultimately, this strategy led to the destruction of the Tsangpa dynasty, the defeat of the Karmapas and their other allies and the Bönpos, by armed forces from the Lhasa valley aided by their Mongol allies, paving the way for Gelugpa political and religious hegemony in Central Tibet.

Apparently by general consensus, by virtue of his position as the Dalai Lama's changdzo (chief attendant, minister), after the Dalai Lama became absolute ruler of Tibet in 1642 Sonam Rabten became the "Desi" or "Viceroy", in fact, the de facto regent or day-to-day ruler of Tibet's governmental affairs. During these years and for the rest of his life (he died in 1658), "there was little doubt that politically Sonam Chophel [Rabten] was more powerful than the Dalai Lama". As a young man, being 22 years his junior, the Dalai Lama addressed him reverentially as "Zhalngo", meaning "the Presence".

During the 1630s Tibet was deeply entangled in rivalry, evolving power struggles and conflicts, not only between the Tibetan religious sects but also between the rising Manchus and the various rival Mongol and Oirat factions, who were also vying for supremacy amongst themselves and on behalf of the religious sects they patronised. For example, Ligdan Khan of the Chahars, a Mongol subgroup who supported the Tsang Karmapas, after retreating from advancing Manchu armies headed for Kokonor intending destroy the Gelug. He died on the way, in 1634.

His vassal Choghtu Khong Tayiji, continued to advance against the Gelugpas, even having his own son Arslan killed after Arslan changed sides, submitted to the Dalai Lama and become a Gelugpa monk. By the mid-1630s, thanks again to the efforts of Sonam Rabten, the 5th Dalai Lama had found a powerful new patron in Güshi Khan of the Khoshut Mongols, a subgroup of the Dzungars, who had recently migrated to the Kokonor area from Dzungaria. He attacked Choghtu Khong Tayiji at Kokonor in 1637 and defeated and killed him, thus eliminating the Tsangpa and the Karmapa's main Mongol patron and protector.

Next, Donyo Dorje, the Bönpo king of Beri in Kham was found writing to the Tsangpa king in Shigatse to propose a co-ordinated 'pincer attack' on the Lhasa Gelugpa monasteries from east and west, seeking to utterly destroy them once and for all. The intercepted letter was sent to Güshi Khan who used it as a pretext to invade central Tibet in 1639 to attack them both, the Bönpo and the Tsangpa. By 1641 he had defeated Donyo Dorje and his allies in Kham and then he marched on Shigatse where after laying siege to their strongholds he defeated Karma Tenkyong, broke the power of the Tsang Karma Kagyu in 1642 and ended the Tsangpa dynasty.

Güshi Khan's attack on the Tsangpa was made on the orders of Sonam Rapten while being publicly and robustly opposed by the Dalai Lama, who, as a matter of conscience, out of compassion and his vision of tolerance for other religious schools, refused to give permission for more warfare in his name after the defeat of the Beri king. Sonam Rabten deviously went behind his master's back to encourage Güshi Khan, to facilitate his plans and to ensure the attacks took place; for this defiance of his master's wishes, Rabten was severely rebuked by the 5th Dalai Lama.

After Desi Sonam Rapten died in 1658, the 5th Dalai Lama appointed his younger brother Depa Norbu (aka Nangso Norbu) as his successor the next year. But after a few months, Norbu betrayed him and led a rebellion against the Ganden Phodrang Government. With his accomplices he seized Samdruptse fort at Shigatse and tried to raise a rebel army from Tsang and Bhutan, but the Dalai Lama foiled his plans without any fighting taking place and Norbu fled. Four other Desis were appointed after Depa Norbu: Trinle Gyatso, Lozang Tutop, Lozang Jinpa and Sangye Gyatso.

==== Reunification of Tibet ====
Having thus defeated all the Gelugpa's rivals and resolved all regional and sectarian conflicts Güshi Khan became the undisputed patron of a unified Tibet and acted as a "Protector of the Gelug", establishing the Khoshut Khanate which covered almost the entire Tibetan plateau, an area corresponding roughly to 'Greater Tibet' including Kham and Amdo, as claimed by exiled groups (see maps). At an enthronement ceremony in Shigatse he conferred full sovereignty over Tibet on the Fifth Dalai Lama, unified for the first time since the collapse of the Tibetan Empire exactly eight centuries earlier. Güshi Khan then retired to Kokonor with his armies and [according to Smith] ruled Amdo himself directly thus creating a precedent for the later separation of Amdo from the rest of Tibet.

In this way, Güshi Khan established the Fifth Dalai Lama as the highest spiritual and political authority in Tibet. 'The Great Fifth' became the temporal ruler of Tibet in 1642 and from then on the rule of the Dalai Lama lineage over some, all or most of Tibet lasted with few breaks for the next 317 years, until 1959, when the 14th Dalai Lama fled to India. In 1645, the Great Fifth began the construction of the Potala Palace in Lhasa.

Güshi Khan died in 1655 and was succeeded by his descendants Dayan, Tenzin Dalai Khan and Tenzin Wangchuk Khan. Güshi Khan's other eight sons settled in Amdo and fought among themselves over territory, so the Fifth Dalai Lama sent governors to rule them in 1656 and 1659, thereby bringing Amdo and thus the whole of Greater Tibet under his personal rule and Gelugpa control. The Mongols in Amdo became absorbed and Tibetanised.

==== Visit to Beijing ====
In 1636 the Manchus proclaimed their dynasty the Qing dynasty, and by 1644 they had completed their conquest of China under the prince regent Dorgon. In 1645, their forces approached Amdo in northern Tibet, causing the Oirat and Khoshut Mongols there to submit in 1647 and send tribute. In 1648, after quelling a rebellion of Tibetans in Gansu-Xining, the Qing invited the Fifth Dalai Lama to visit its court in Beijing since it wished to engender Tibetan influence in its dealings with the Mongols. The Qing was aware the Dalai Lama had extraordinary influence with the Mongols and saw relations with the Dalai Lama as a means to facilitate submission of the Khalka Mongols, traditional patrons of the Karma Kagyu sect.

Similarly, since the Tibetan Gelugpa were keen to revive a priest-patron relationship with the dominant power in China and Inner Asia, the Qing invitation was accepted. After five years of complex diplomatic negotiations about whether the emperor or his representatives should meet the Dalai Lama inside or outside the Great Wall, when the meeting would be astrologically favourable, how it would be conducted, and so on, it took place in Beijing in 1653.

The Shunzhi Emperor was then 16 years old, having ascended the throne in 1650 upon Dorgon's death. For the Qing, although the Dalai Lama was not required to kowtow to the emperor, who rose from his throne and advanced 30 feet to greet him, the visit's significance was that of nominal political submission by the Dalai Lama since Inner Asian heads of state did not travel to meet each other but sent envoys. But for Tibetan Buddhist historians it was interpreted as the start of an era of independent rule by the Dalai Lamas, and of Qing patronage alongside that of the Mongols.

When the 5th Dalai Lama returned, the emperor had granted him a golden seal of authority and golden sheets with texts in Manchu, Tibetan, and Han Chinese. The 5th Dalai Lama wanted to use the golden seal of authority right away, but, Lobzang Gyatsho noted, "The Tibetan version of the inscription of the seal was translated by a Mongol translator but was not a good translation". After correction, it read: "The one who resides in the Western peaceful and virtuous paradise is unalterable Vajradhara, Ocean Lama, unifier of the doctrines of the Buddha for all beings under the sky". The words of the diploma ran: "Proclamation, to let all the people of the western hemisphere know". Tibetan historian Nyima Gyaincain points out that based on these texts, the Dalai Lama was only a subordinate of the emperor.

Despite such patronising attempts by Chinese officials and historians to symbolically show for the record that they held political influence over Tibet, the Tibetans did not accept any such symbols imposed on them by the Chinese with this kind of motive. For example, of the golden seal, the Fifth Dalai Lama wrote in Dukula, his autobiography, that after his 1653 visit to the emperor, "the emperor made his men bring a golden seal for me that had three vertical lines in three parallel scripts: Chinese, Mongol and Tibetan". He also criticised the words carved on this gift as incorrectly translated into Tibetan, writing, "The Tibetan version of the inscription of the seal was translated by a Mongol translator but was not a good translation". When he returned to Tibet, he discarded the emperor's golden seal and made a new one for state usage, writing in his autobiography: "Leaving out the Chinese characters that were on the seal given by the emperor, a new seal was carved for stamping documents that dealt with territorial issues. The first imprint of the seal was offered with prayers to the image of Lokeshvara".

==== Relations with the Qing dynasty ====
The 17th-century struggles for domination between the Manchu-led Qing dynasty and the various Mongol groups spilled over to involve Tibet because of the Fifth Dalai Lama's strong influence over the Mongols as a result of their general adoption of Tibetan Buddhism and their consequent deep loyalty to the Dalai Lama as their guru. Until 1674, the Fifth Dalai Lama had mediated in Dzungar Mongol affairs whenever they required him to do so, and the Kangxi Emperor, who had succeeded the Shunzhi Emperor in 1661, would accept and confirm his decisions automatically.

For the Kangxi Emperor, the alliance between the Dzungar Mongols and the Tibetans was unsettling because he feared it had the potential to unite all the other Mongol tribes together against the Qing Empire, including those tribes who had already submitted. Therefore, in 1674, the Kangxi Emperor, annoyed by the Fifth's less than full cooperation in quelling a rebellion against the Qing in Yunnan, ceased deferring to him as regards Mongol affairs and started dealing with them directly.

In the same year, 1674, the Dalai Lama, then at the height of his powers and conducting a foreign policy independent of the Qing, caused Mongol troops to occupy the border post of Dartsedo between Kham and Sichuan, further annoying the Kangxi Emperor who (according to Smith) already considered Tibet as part of the Qing Empire. It also increased Qing suspicion about Tibetan relations with the Mongol groups and led him to seek strategic opportunities to oppose and undermine Mongol influence in Tibet and eventually, within 50 years, to defeat the Mongols militarily and to establish the Qing as sole 'patrons and protectors' of Tibet in their place.

==== Cultural development ====
The time of the Fifth Dalai Lama, who reigned from 1642 to 1682 and founded the government known as the Ganden Phodrang, was a period of rich cultural development. His reign and that of Desi Sangye Gyatso are noteworthy for the upsurge in literary activity and of cultural and economic life that occurred. The same goes for the great increase in the number of foreign visitors thronging Lhasa during the period as well as for the number of inventions and institutions that are attributed to the 'Great Fifth', as the Tibetans refer to him. The most dynamic and prolific of the early Dalai Lamas, he composed more literary works than all the other Dalai Lamas combined. Writing on a wide variety of subjects he is specially noted for his works on history, classical Indian poetry in Sanskrit and his biographies of notable personalities of his epoch, as well as his own two autobiographies, one spiritual in nature and the other political (see Further Reading). He also taught and travelled extensively, reshaped the politics of Central Asia, unified Tibet, conceived and constructed the Potala Palace and is remembered for establishing systems of national medical care and education.

==== Death of the fifth Dalai Lama ====
The Fifth Dalai Lama died in 1682. Tibetan historian Nyima Gyaincain points out that the written wills from the fifth Dalai Lama before he died explicitly said his title and authority were from the Emperor of China, and he was subordinate of the Emperor of China.

The Fifth Dalai Lama's death in 1682 was kept secret for fifteen years by his regent Desi Sangye Gyatso. He pretended the Dalai Lama was in retreat and ruled on his behalf, secretly selecting the 6th Dalai Lama and presenting him as someone else. Tibetan historian Nyima Gyaincain points out that Desi Sangye Gyatso wanted to consolidate his personal status and power by not reporting the death of the fifth Dalai Lama to the Emperor of China, and also collude with the rebellion group of the Qing dynasty, Mongol Dzungar tribe in order to counter influence from another Mongol Khoshut tribe in Tibet. Being afraid of prosecution by the Kangxi Emperor of China, Desi Sangye Gyatso explained with fear and trepidation the reason behind his action to the Emperor.

In 1705, Desi Sangye Gyatso was killed by Lha-bzang Khan of the Mongol Khoshut tribe because of his actions including his illegal action of selecting the 6th Dalai Lama. Since the Kangxi Emperor was not happy about Desi Sangye Gyatso's action of not reporting, the Emperor gave Lha-bzang Khan additional title and golden seal. The Kangxi Emperor also ordered Lha-bzang Khan to arrest the 6th Dalai Lama and send him to Beijing, the 6th Dalai Lama died when he was en route to Beijing. Journalist Thomas Laird argues that it was apparently done so that construction of the Potala Palace could be finished, and it was to prevent Tibet's neighbors, the Mongols and the Qing, from taking advantage of an interregnum in the succession of the Dalai Lamas.

=== 6th Dalai Lama ===
The Sixth Dalai Lama (1683–1706) was born near Tawang, now in India. After death of the 5th Dalai Lama, the regent Desi Sangye Gyatso kept death of the 5th Dalai Lama a secret, this allowed him to continue to use the authority of the Fifth Dalai Lama to manage the affairs of the Gelug. Tsangyang Gyatso was picked out in 1685, but his parents were not informed. In 1696, while suppressing the Dzungar rebellion, Kangxi Emperor accidentally learned from the captives that the 5th Dalai Lama had died many years ago. Kangxi severely rebuked the regent for his mistake, the regent admitted his mistake and sent people to Monpa to welcome the reincarnated soul boy in 1697. After 16 years of study as a novice monk, in 1702 in his 20th year he rejected full ordination and gave up his monk's robes and monastic life, preferring the lifestyle of a layman.

In 1703 Güshi Khan's ruling grandson Tenzin Wangchuk Khan was murdered by his brother Lhazang Khan who usurped the Khoshut Khanate's Tibetan throne, but unlike his four predecessors he started interfering directly in Tibetan affairs in Lhasa; he opposed the Fifth Dalai Lama's regent, Desi Sangye Gyatso for his deceptions and in the same year, with the support of the Kangxi Emperor, he forced him out of office. When Lhazang was requested by the Tibetans to leave Lhasa politics to them and to retire to Kokonor like his predecessors, he quit the city. Desi Sangye Gyatso decided to kill Lhazang, he secretly sent someone to poison the food of Lhazang, but was discovered. Lhazang was furious and immediately mobilized a large army to defeat the Tibetan army and killed Desi Sangye Gyatso. In 1705, he wrote a letter to the Qing government, reporting Desi Sangye Gyatso's rebellion and that the sixth Dalai Lama, appointed by Desi Sangye Gyatso, was addicted to wine and sex and ignored religious affairs. He reported the Dalai Lama was not a real Dalai Lama and requested emperor to demote and revoke him. He used the Sixth's escapades as an excuse to seize full control of Tibet. Most Tibetans, though, still supported their Dalai Lama despite his behaviour and deeply resented Lhazang Khan's interference. But Emperor Kangxi then issued an edict: "Because Lhazang Khan reported to depose the sixth Dalai Lama appointed by Desi Sangye Gyatso, the sixth Dalai Lama is ordered to be sent to capital Beijing." In 1706 with the compliance of the Kangxi Emperor, the Sixth Dalai Lama was deposed and arrested by Lhazang who considered him to be an impostor set up by the regent. Lhazang Khan, now acting as the only outright foreign ruler that Tibet had ever had, then sent him to Beijing under escort to appear before the emperor but he died mysteriously on the way near Lake Qinghai, ostensibly from illness, he was 24 years' old.

Having discredited and deposed the Sixth Dalai Lama, whom he considered an impostor, and having removed the regent, Lhazang Khan pressed the Lhasa Gelugpa lamas to endorse a new Dalai Lama in Tsangyang Gyatso's place as the true incarnation of the Fifth. They eventually nominated one Pekar Dzinpa, a monk but also rumored to be Lhazang's son, and Lhazang had him installed as the 'real' Sixth Dalai Lama, endorsed by the Panchen Lama and named Yeshe Gyatso in 1707. This choice was in no way accepted by the Tibetan people, however, nor by Lhazang's princely Mongol rivals in Kokonor who resented his usurpation of the Khoshut Tibetan throne as well as his meddling in Tibetan affairs.

The Kangxi Emperor concurred with them, after sending investigators, initially declining to recognize Yeshe Gyatso. He recognized him in 1710, after sending a Qing official party to assist Lhazang in 'restoring order'. These were the first Chinese representatives of any sort to officiate in Tibet. At the same time, while this puppet 'Dalai Lama' had no political power, the Kangxi Emperor secured from Lhazang Khan in return for this support the promise of regular payments of tribute; this was the first time tribute had been paid to the Manchu by the Mongols in Tibet and the first overt acknowledgment of Qing supremacy over Mongol rule in Tibet.

=== 7th Dalai Lama ===
In 1708, in accordance with an indication given by the 6th Dalai Lama when quitting Lhasa, a child called Kelzang Gyatso had been born at Lithang in eastern Tibet who was soon claimed by local Tibetans to be his incarnation. After going into hiding out of fear of Lhazang Khan, he was installed in Lithang monastery. Along with some of the Kokonor Mongol princes, rivals of Lhazang, in defiance of the situation in Lhasa the Tibetans of Kham duly recognised him as the Seventh Dalai Lama in 1712, retaining his birth-name of Kelzang Gyatso. For security reasons he was moved to Derge monastery and eventually, in 1716, now also backed and sponsored by the Kangxi Emperor of China.

The Tibetans asked Dzungars to bring a true Dalai Lama to Lhasa, but the Manchu Chinese did not want to release Kelsan Gyatso to the Mongol Dzungars. The Regent Taktse Shabdrung and Tibetan officials then wrote a letter to the Manchu Chinese Emperor that they recognized Kelsang Gyatso as the Dalai Lama. The Emperor then granted Kelsang Gyatso a golden seal of authority. The Sixth Dalai Lama was taken to Amdo at the age of 8 to be installed in Kumbum Monastery with great pomp and ceremony.

According to Smith, the Kangxi Emperor now arranged to protect the child and keep him at Kumbum monastery in Amdo in reserve just in case his ally Lhasang Khan and his 'real' Sixth Dalai Lama, were overthrown. But according to Mullin, the emperor's support came from genuine spiritual recognition and respect rather than being politically motivated.

==== Dzungar invasion ====
In any case, the Kangxi Emperor took full advantage of having Kelzang Gyatso under Qing control at Kumbum after other Mongols from the Dzungar tribes led by Tsewang Rabtan who was related to his supposed ally Lhazang Khan, deceived and betrayed the latter by invading Tibet and capturing Lhasa in 1717.

These Dzungars, who were Buddhist, had supported the Fifth Dalai Lama and his regent. They were secretly petitioned by the Lhasa Gelugpa lamas to invade with their help in order to rid them of their foreign ruler Lhazang Khan and to replace the unpopular Sixth Dalai Lama pretender with the young Kelzang Gyatso. This plot suited the devious Dzungar leaders' ambitions and they were only too happy to oblige. Early in 1717, after conspiring to undermine Lhazang Khan through treachery they entered Tibet from the northwest with a large army, sending a smaller force to Kumbum to collect Kelzang Gyatso and escort him to Lhasa.

By the end of the year, with Tibetan connivance they had captured Lhasa, killed Lhazang and all his family and deposed Yeshe Gyatso. But their force sent to fetch Kelzang Gyatso was intercepted and destroyed by Qing armies alerted by Lhazang. In Lhasa, the unruly Dzungar not only failed to produce the boy but also went on a rampage, looting and destroying holy places, abusing the populace, killing hundreds of Nyingma monks, causing chaos and bloodshed, and turning their Tibetan allies against them. The Tibetans soon appealed to the Kangxi Emperor to rid them of the Dzungars.

When the Dzungars had first attacked, the weakened Lhazang sent word to the Qing for support and they quickly dispatched two armies to assist, the first Chinese armies ever to enter Tibet, but they arrived too late. In 1718 they were halted not far from Lhasa to be defeated and then annihilated by the Dzungars in the Battle of the Salween River.

==== Enthronement in Lhasa ====
This defeat made the Kangxi Emperor determined to expel the Dzungars from Tibet once and for all. He set about assembling and dispatching a much larger force to march on Lhasa, accompanied by the young Kelzang Gyatso. On the imperial army's stately passage from Kumbum to Lhasa, with the boy adoringly welcomed at every stage, many Khoshut Mongols and Tibetans were eager to join its ranks.

By the autumn of 1720, the marauding Dzungar Mongols had been vanquished from Tibet. Qing imperial forces had entered Lhasa triumphantly with the 12-year-old, acting as patrons of the Dalai Lama, liberators of Tibet, allies of the Tibetan anti-Dzungar forces led by Kangchenas and Polhanas, and allies of the Khoshut Mongol princes. The delighted Tibetans enthroned him as the Seventh Dalai Lama at the Potala Palace.

A new Tibetan government was established consisting of a Kashag or cabinet of Tibetan ministers headed by Kangchenas. Kelzang Gyatso, too young to participate in politics, studied Buddhism. He played a symbolic role in government, and, being profoundly revered by the Mongols, he exercised much influence with the Qing who now had now taken over Tibet's patronage and protection from them.

==== Exile to Kham ====
Having vanquished the Dzungars, the Qing army withdrew leaving the Seventh Dalai Lama as a political figurehead and only a Khalkha Mongol as the Qing amban or representative and a garrison in Lhasa. After the Kangxi Emperor died in 1722 and was succeeded by his son, the Yongzheng Emperor, these were also withdrawn, leaving the Tibetans to rule autonomously and showing the Qing were interested in an alliance, not conquest. In 1723, after brutally quelling a major rebellion by zealous Tibetan patriots and disgruntled Khoshut Mongols from Amdo who attacked Xining, the Qing intervened again, splitting Tibet by putting Amdo and Kham under their own more direct control.

Continuing Qing interference in Central Tibetan politics and religion incited an anti-Qing faction to quarrel with the Qing-sympathising Tibetan nobles in power in Lhasa, led by Kanchenas who was supported by Polhanas. This led eventually to the murder of Kanchenas in 1727 and a civil war that was resolved in 1728 with the canny Polhanas, who had sent for Qing assistance, the victor. When the Qing forces did arrive they punished the losers and exiled the Seventh Dalai Lama to Kham, under the pretence of sending him to Beijing, because his father had assisted the defeated, anti-Qing faction. He studied and taught Buddhism there for the next seven years.

==== Return to Lhasa ====
In 1735 he was allowed back to Lhasa to study and teach, but still under strict control, being mistrusted by the Qing, while Polhanas ruled Central Tibet under nominal Qing supervision. Meanwhile, the Qing had promoted the Fifth Panchen Lama to be a rival leader and reinstated the ambans and the Lhasa garrison. Polhanas died in 1747. He was succeeded by his son Gyurme Namgyal, the last dynastic ruler of Tibet, who was far less cooperative with the Qing. He built a Tibetan army and started conspiring with the Dzungars to rid Tibet of Qing influence. In 1750, when the ambans realised this, they invited him and personally assassinated him. Despite the Dalai Lama's attempts to calm the angered populace, a vengeful Tibetan mob assassinated the ambans, along with most of their escort.

==== Restoration as Tibet's political leader ====
The Qing sent yet another force 'to restore order' but when it arrived the situation had already been stabilised under the leadership of the 7th Dalai Lama who was now seen to have demonstrated loyalty to the Qing. Just as Güshi Khan had done with the Fifth Dalai Lama, they therefore helped reconstitute the government with the Dalai Lama presiding over a Kashag of four Tibetans, reinvesting him with temporal power in addition to his already established spiritual leadership. This arrangement, with a Kashag under the Dalai Lama or his regent, outlasted the Qing dynasty which collapsed in 1912.

The ambans and their garrison were reinstated to observe and to some extent supervise affairs. Their influence generally waned with the power of their empire, which gradually declined after 1792 along with its influence over Tibet, a decline aided by a succession of corrupt or incompetent ambans. Moreover, there was soon no reason for the Qing to fear the Dzungar; by the time the Seventh Dalai Lama died in 1757 at the age of 49, the entire Dzungar people had been practically exterminated through years of genocidal campaigns by Qing armies, and deadly smallpox epidemics, with the survivors being forcibly transported into China. Their emptied lands were then awarded to other peoples.

According to Mullin, despite living through such violent times Kelzang Gyatso was perhaps 'the most spiritually learned and accomplished of any Dalai Lama', his written works comprising several hundred titles including 'some of Tibet's finest spiritual literary achievements'. Despite his apparent lack of zeal in politics, Kelzang Gyatso is credited with establishing in 1751 the reformed government of Tibet headed by the Dalai Lama, which continued over 200 years until the 1950s, and then in exile. Construction of the Norbulingka, the 'Summer Palace' of the Dalai Lamas in Lhasa was started during Kelzang Gyatso's reign.

=== 8th Dalai Lama ===
The Eighth Dalai Lama, Jamphel Gyatso, was born in Tsang in 1758 and died aged 46 having taken little part in Tibetan politics, mostly leaving temporal matters to his regents and the ambans. The Emperor of China exempted him from the lot-drawing ceremony of the Golden Urn. Qianlong Emperor officially accepted Gyiangbai as the 8th Dalai Lama when the 6th Panchen Erdeni came to congratulate the emperor on his 70th birthday in 1780. The emperor granted the 8th Dalai Lama a jade seal of authority and jade sheets of confirmation of authority. The confirmation of authority says:

You, the Dalai Lama, are the legal incarnation of Zhongkapa. You are granted the jade certificate of confirmation of authority and jade seal of authority, which you enshrine in the Potala monastery to guard the gate of Buddhism forever. All documents sent for the country's important ceremonies must be stamped with this seal, and all the other reports can be stamped with the original seal. Since you enjoy such honor, you have to make efforts to promote self-cultivation, study and propagate Buddhism, and help me promote Buddhism and goodness of the previous generation of the Dalai Lama for the people, and for the long life of our country.

The Dalai Lama, his later generations and the local government cherished both the seal of authority and the sheets of authority. They were preserved as the root of their power.

The 8th Dalai Lama lived almost as long as the Seventh, but was overshadowed by many contemporary lamas in terms of both religious and political accomplishment. According to Mullin, the 14th Dalai Lama has pointed to certain indications that Jamphel Gyatso might have been the incarnation not of the 7th Dalai Lama but of Jamyang Chojey, a disciple of Tsongkhapa and founder of Drepung monastery who was also reputed to be an incarnation of Avalokiteshvara. In any case, he lived a quiet and unassuming life as a devoted and studious monk, uninvolved in the kind of dramas that had surrounded his predecessors.

Nevertheless, Jamphel Gyatso was said to possess all the signs of being the true incarnation of the Seventh. This was claimed to have been confirmed by many portents clear to the Tibetans and so, in 1762, at age five, he was enthroned as the Eighth Dalai Lama at the Potala Palace. At age 23 he was persuaded to assume the throne as ruler of Tibet with a regent to assist him and after three years of this, when the regent went to Beijing as ambassador in 1784, he ruled alone for four more years. But feeling unsuited to worldly affairs and unhappy in this role, he then retired from public office to concentrate on religious activities until his death in 1804. He is also credited with the construction of the Norbulingka "Summer Palace" started by his predecessor and with ordaining 10,000 monks in his efforts to foster monasticism.

=== 9th to 12th Dalai Lamas ===
Hugh Richardson's summary of the period covering the four short-lived, 19th-century Dalai Lamas:

After him [the 8th Dalai Lama, Jamphel Gyatso], the 9th and 10th Dalai Lamas died before attaining their majority: one of them is credibly stated to have been murdered and strong suspicion attaches to the other. The 11th and 12th were each enthroned but died soon after being invested with power. For 113 years, therefore, supreme authority in Tibet was in the hands of a Lama Regent, except for about two years when a lay noble held office and for short periods of nominal rule by the 11th and 12th Dalai Lamas. (Note: According to Mullin, Smith and Shakabpa, however, the 12th Dalai Lama's Regent, Reting Rinpoche, was deposed in 1862 in a coup by Gyalpo Shetra and Tibet was ruled by despots or assemblies of abbots and ministers for the next eleven years, that is until 1873 when the 12th Dalai Lama assumed power.)
It has sometimes been suggested that this state of affairs was brought about by the Ambans—the Imperial Residents in Tibet—because it would be easier to control the Tibet through a Regent than when a Dalai Lama, with his absolute power, was at the head of the government. That is not true. The regular ebb and flow of events followed its set course. The Imperial Residents in Tibet, after the first flush of zeal in 1750, grew less and less interested and efficient. Tibet was, to them, exile from the urbanity and culture of Peking; and so far from dominating the Regents, the Ambans allowed themselves to be dominated. It was the ambition and greed for power of Tibetans that led to five successive Dalai Lamas being subjected to continuous tutelage.

Thubten Jigme Norbu, the elder brother of the 14th Dalai Lama, described these unfortunate events as follows, although there are few, if any, indications that any of the four were said to be 'Chinese-appointed imposters':

It is perhaps more than a coincidence that between the seventh and the thirteenth holders of that office, only one reached his majority. The eighth, Gyampal Gyatso, died when he was in his thirties, Lungtog Gyatso when he was eleven, Tsultrim Gyatso at eighteen, Khadrup Gyatso when he was eighteen also, and Krinla Gyatso at about the same age. The circumstances are such that it is very likely that some, if not all, were poisoned, either by loyal Tibetans for being Chinese-appointed impostors, or by the Chinese for not being properly manageable. Many Tibetans think that this was done at the time when the young [Dalai Lama] made his ritual visit to the Lake Lhamtso. ... Each of the four [Dalai Lamas] to die young expired shortly after his visit to the lake. Many said it was because they were not the true reincarnations, but imposters imposed by the Chinese. Others tell stories of how the cooks of the retinue, which in those days included many Chinese, were bribed to put poison in the [Dalai Lama's] food. The 13th [Dalai Lama] did not visit Lhamtso until he was 25 years old. He was adequately prepared by spiritual exercise and he also had faithful cooks. The Chinese were disappointed when he did not die like his predecessors, and he was to live long enough to give them much more cause for regret. (Note: According to their biographies, the Eighth, Jamphel Gyatso lived to 46 years old, the Ninth, Lungtok Gyatso to 9 years, the Tenth, Tsultrim Gyatso to 21, the Eleventh, Khedrup Gyatso to 17 and the Twelfth, Trinley Gyatso to 18.)

According to Mullin, on the other hand, it is improbable that the Manchus would have murdered any of these four for being 'unmanageable' since it would have been in their best interests to have strong Dalai Lamas ruling in Lhasa, he argues, agreeing with Richardson that it was rather "the ambition and greed for power of Tibetans" that might have caused the Lamas' early deaths. (Note: Considering what occurred in Lhasa after the Chinese ambans murdered Gyurme Namgyal in 1750, however, the Manchus would have been particularly reluctant to murder a Dalai Lama.) Further, if Tibetan nobles murdered any of them, it would more likely have been in order to protect or enhance their family interests rather than out of suspicion that the Dalai Lamas were seen as Chinese-appointed imposters as suggested by Norbu. They could also have died from illnesses, possibly contracted from diseases to which they had no immunity, carried to Lhasa by the multitudes of pilgrims visiting from nearby countries for blessings. Finally, from the Buddhist point of view, Mullin says, "Simply stated, these four Dalai Lamas died young because the world did not have enough good karma to deserve their presence".

In his history The Water-Bird and Other Years, based on the Tibetan minister Surkhang Sawang Chenmo's historical manuscripts, Tibetan historian K. Dhondup disagrees with Mullin's opinion that having strong Dalai Lamas in power in Tibet would have been in China's best interests. He notes that many historians are compelled to suspect Manchu foul play in these serial early deaths because the Ambans had such latitude to interfere; the Manchu, he says, "to perpetuate their domination over Tibetan affairs, did not desire a Dalai Lama who will ascend the throne and become a strong and capable ruler over his own country and people". By upholding de facto Tibetan independence from China from 1912 to 1950, the 13th Dalai Lama is the living proof of this, Dhondup argues. This account also corresponds with TJ Norbu's observations above.

Finally, while acknowledging the possibility, the 14th Dalai Lama himself doubts they were poisoned. He ascribes the probable cause of these early deaths to negligence, foolishness and lack of proper medical knowledge and attention. "Even today", he has said, "when people get sick, some [Tibetans] will say: 'Just do your prayers, you don't need medical treatment.'"

==== 9th Dalai Lama ====
Born in Kham in 1805–6 amidst the usual miraculous signs the Ninth Dalai Lama, Lungtok Gyatso was appointed by the 7th Panchen Lama's search team at the age of two and enthroned in the Potala in 1808 at an impressive ceremony attended by representatives from China, Mongolia, Nepal and Bhutan. Exemption from using Golden Urn was approved by the Emperor. Tibetan historian Nyima Gyaincain and Wang Jiawei point out that the 9th Dalai Lama was allowed to use the seal of authority given to the late 8th Dalai Lama by the Emperor of China

His second Regent Demo Tulku was the biographer of the 8th and 9th Dalai Lamas and though the 9th died at the age of 9, his biography is as lengthy as those of many of the early Dalai Lamas. In 1793 under Manchu pressure, Tibet had closed its borders to foreigners. In 1811, a British Sinologist, Thomas Manning became the first Englishman to visit Lhasa. Considered to be 'the first Chinese scholar in Europe' he stayed five months and gave enthusiastic accounts in his journal of his regular meetings with the Ninth Dalai Lama whom he found fascinating: "beautiful, elegant, refined, intelligent, and entirely self-possessed, even at the age of six". Three years later in March 1815 the young Lungtok Gyatso caught a severe cold and, leaving the Potala Palace to preside over the Monlam Prayer Festival, he contracted pneumonia from which he soon died.

==== 10th Dalai Lama ====
Like the Seventh Dalai Lama, the Tenth, Tsultrim Gyatso, was born in Lithang, Kham, where the Third Dalai Lama had built a monastery. It was 1816 and Regent Demo Tulku and the Seventh Panchen Lama followed indications from Nechung, the 'state oracle' which led them to appoint him at the age of two. He passed all the tests and was brought to Lhasa but official recognition was delayed until 1822 when he was enthroned and ordained by the Seventh Panchen Lama. There are conflicting reports about whether the Chinese 'Golden Urn' was utilised by drawing lots to choose him, but lot-drawing result was reported and approved by emperor. The 10th Dalai Lama mentioned in his biography that he was allowed to use the golden seal of authority based on the convention set up by the late Dalai Lama. At the investiture, decree of the Emperor of China was issued and read out.

After 15 years of intensive studies and failing health he died, in 1837, at the age of 20 or 21. He identified with ordinary people rather than the court officials and often sat on his verandah in the sunshine with the office clerks. Intending to empower the common people he planned to institute political and economic reforms to share the nation's wealth more equitably. Over this period his health had deteriorated, the implication being that he may have suffered from slow poisoning by Tibetan aristocrats whose interests these reforms were threatening. He was also dissatisfied with his Regent and the Kashag and scolded them for not alleviating the condition of the common people, who had suffered much in small ongoing regional civil wars waged in Kokonor between Mongols, local Tibetans and the government over territory, and in Kham to extract unpaid taxes from rebellious Tibetan communities.

==== 11th Dalai Lama ====
Born in Gathar, Kham in 1838 and soon discovered by the official search committee with the help of the Nechung Oracle, the Eleventh Dalai Lama was brought to Lhasa in 1841 and recognised, enthroned and named Khedrup Gyatso by the Panchen Lama on April 16, 1842, seal of authority and golden sheets were granted on the same date. Sitting-in-the-bed ceremony was held in July 1844. After that he was immersed in religious studies under the Panchen Lama, amongst other great masters. Meanwhile, there were court intrigues and ongoing power struggles taking place between the various Lhasa factions, the Regent, the Kashag, the powerful nobles and the abbots and monks of the three great monasteries. The Tsemonling Regent became mistrusted and was forcibly deposed, there were machinations, plots, beatings and kidnappings of ministers and so forth, resulting at last in the Panchen Lama being appointed as interim Regent to keep the peace.

Eventually the Third Reting Rinpoche was made Regent, and in 1855, Khedrup Gyatso, appearing to be an extremely promising prospect, was requested to take the reins of power at the age of 17. He was enthroned as ruler of Tibet in 1855, on orders of the Xianfeng Emperor. He died after just 11 months, no reason for his sudden and premature death being given in these accounts, Shakabpa and Mullin's histories both being based on untranslated Tibetan chronicles. The respected Reting Rinpoche was recalled once again to act as Regent and requested to lead the search for the next incarnation, the twelfth.

==== 12th Dalai Lama ====
In 1856, a child was born in south central Tibet with all the usual extraordinary signs. He came to the notice of the search team, was investigated, passed the traditional tests and was recognised as the 12th Dalai Lama in 1858. The use of the Chinese Golden Urn at the insistence of the regent, who was later accused of being a Chinese lackey, confirmed this choice to everyone's satisfaction. He was renamed Trinley Gyatso and enthroned on July 3, 1860, after the emperor's edict from Amban was announced. He underwent 13 years of intensive tutelage and training before becoming Tibet's ruler at age 17.

His minority seems to have been a time of even deeper Lhasan political intrigue and power struggles than his predecessor's. In 1862 Wangchuk Shetra, a minister the regent had banished for conspiring against him, led a coup. Shetra contrived to return, deposed the regent, who fled to China, and seized power, appointing himself "Desi", or Prime Minister. He then ruled with "absolute power" for three years, quelling a major rebellion in northern Kham in 1863 and reestablishing Tibetan control over significant Qing-held territory there. Shetra died in 1864 and the Kashag reassumed power. The retired 76th Ganden Tripa, Khyenrab Wangchuk, was appointed regent but his role was limited to supervising and mentoring Trinley Gyatso.

In 1868 Shetra's coup organiser, a semi-literate Ganden monk named Palden Dondrup, seized power in another coup and ruled as a cruel despot for three years, putting opponents to death by having them "sewn into fresh animal skins and thrown in the river". In 1871, at the request of officials outraged after Dondrup had done that to one minister and imprisoned several others, he was ousted and committed suicide after a counter-coup coordinated by the supposedly powerless regent Khyenrab Wangchuk. As a result, Tibetans fondly remember Khyenrab Wangchuk, who died the next year, as saviour of the Dalai Lama and the nation. The Kashag and the Tsongdu or National Assembly were reinstated, and, presided over by a Dalai Lama or his regent, ruled without further interruption until 1959.

But according to Smith, during Trinley Gyatso's minority, an alliance of monks and officials called Gandre Drungche (Ganden and Drepung Monks Assembly) deposed the regent in 1862 for abuse of authority and closeness with China; this body then ruled Tibet for ten years until it dissolved when a National Assembly of monks and officials called the Tsongdu was created and took over. Smith makes no mention of Shetra or Dondrup acting as usurpers and despots in this period.

In any case, Trinley Gyatso died within three years of assuming power. In 1873, at age 20, "he suddenly became ill and passed away". Accounts of his cause of death diverge. Mullin relates an interesting theory, based on Tibetan sources: out of concern for the monastic tradition, Trinley Gyatso chose to die and reincarnate as the 13th Dalai Lama rather than marry a woman called Rigma Tsomo from Kokonor and leaving an heir to "oversee Tibet's future". On the other hand, without citing sources, Shakabpa notes that Trinley Gyatso was influenced and manipulated by two close acquaintances who were subsequently accused of having a hand in his fatal illness and imprisoned, tortured, and exiled as a result.

=== 13th Dalai Lama ===
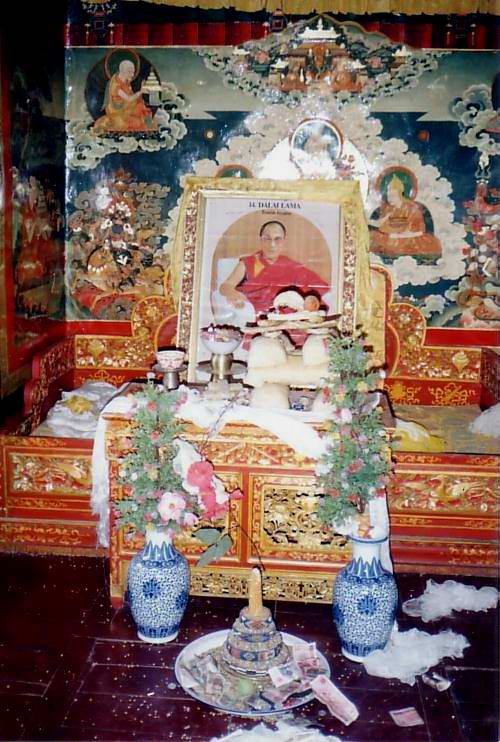
Throne awaiting Dalai Lama's return. Summer residence of 14th Dalai Lama, Nechung, Tibet.

In 1877, request to exempt Lobu Zangtab Kaijia Mucuo (Chinese: 罗布藏塔布开甲木措) from using lot-drawing process Golden Urn to become the 13th Dalai Lama was approved by the Central Government. The 13th Dalai Lama assumed ruling power from the monasteries, which previously had great influence on the Regent, in 1895. Due to his two periods of exile in 1904–1909 to escape the British invasion of 1904, and from 1910–1912 to escape a Chinese invasion, he became well aware of the complexities of international politics and was the first Dalai Lama to become aware of the importance of foreign relations. After his return from exile in India and Sikkim during January 1913, he assumed control of foreign relations and dealt directly with the Maharaja, with the British Political officer in Sikkim and with the king of Nepal – rather than letting the Kashag or parliament do it.

The Great Thirteenth Thubten Gyatso then published the Tibetan Declaration of Independence for the entirety of Tibet in 1913. Tibet's independence was never recognized by the Chinese (who claimed all land ever administered by the Manchus) but was recognized by the Kingdom of Nepal, who would use Tibet as one of its first references regarding its independent status when submitting an application to join the UN in 1949. According to a Tibetan website, Nepal listed Tibet as a country just as independent and sovereign, with no mention of Chinese 'suzerainty'. Its relations with Tibet were apparently second in significance only to its relations with Britain, and even more significant than its relations with the USA or even India. Nepal established diplomatic relations with the People's Republic of China in 1955 and recognized Tibet as a part of China.

Furthermore, Tibet and Mongolia both signed the Treaty of friendship and alliance between the Government of Mongolia and Tibet. Neither countries' independence statuses were ever recognized by the KMT government in China, who would continue to completely claim both as Chinese territory. He expelled the ambans and all Chinese civilians in the country and instituted many measures to modernize Tibet. These included provisions to curb excessive demands on peasants for provisions by the monasteries and tax evasion by the nobles, setting up an independent police force, the abolition of the death penalty, extension of secular education, and the provision of electricity throughout the city of Lhasa in the 1920s. He died in 1933.

=== 14th Dalai Lama ===
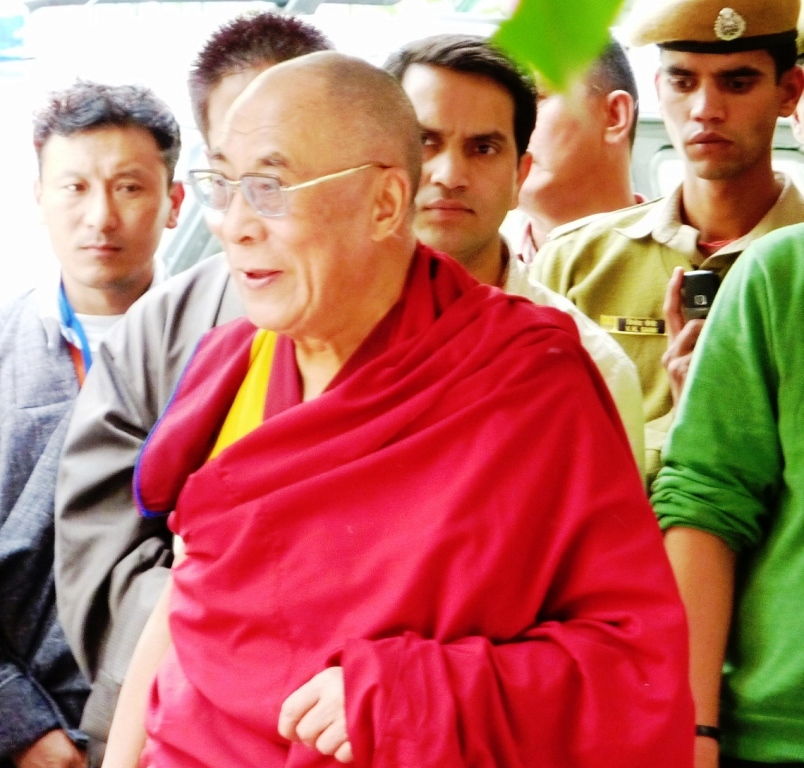
The Dalai Lama giving teachings at Sissu, Lahaul

The 14th Dalai Lama was born on 6 July 1935 on a straw mat in a cowshed to a farmer's family in a remote part of Tibet. According to most Western journalistic sources he was born into a humble family of farmers as one of 16 children, and one of the three reincarnated rinpoches in the same family. On 5 February 1940, the Central Government approved the request to exempt Lhamo Thondup (Chinese: 拉木登珠) from the lot-drawing process to become the 14th Dalai Lama.

The 14th Dalai Lama was not formally enthroned until 17 November 1950, during the Battle of Chamdo with the People's Republic of China. On 18 April 1959, he issued a statement that in 1951, the Dalai Lama and the Tibetan government were pressured into accepting the Seventeen Point Agreement for the Peaceful Liberation of Tibet by which it became formally incorporated into the People's Republic of China. The United States informed the Dalai Lama in 1951 that in order to receive its assistance and support he must leave Tibet and publicly disavow "agreements concluded under duress" between Tibetan and Chinese representatives. Fearing for his life in the wake of a revolt in Tibet in 1959, the 14th Dalai Lama fled to India, where he led a government in exile.

With the aim of launching guerrilla operations against the Chinese, the Central Intelligence Agency funded the Dalai Lama's administration with US$1.7 million a year in the 1960s. In 2001, the 14th Dalai Lama ceded his partial power over the government to an elected parliament of Tibetan exiles. His original goal was full independence for Tibet, but by the late 1980s he sought high-level autonomy instead. He continued to seek greater autonomy from China, but Dolma Gyari, deputy speaker of the parliament-in-exile, said: "If the middle path fails in the short term, we will be forced to opt for complete independence or self-determination as per the UN charter".

The 14th Dalai Lama became one of the two most popular world leaders by 2013 (tied with Barack Obama), according to a poll by Harris Interactive of New York, which sampled public opinion in the U.S. and six major European countries.

In 2014 and 2016, he said that Tibet wants to be part of China but China should let Tibet preserve its culture and script.

In 2018, he said that "Europe belongs to the Europeans" and that Europe has a moral obligation to aid refugees whose lives are in peril. He added that Europe should receive, help, and educate refugees but that they should ultimately return to develop their home countries. He made similar comments in an interview the next year. He also said that a female Dalai Lama "should be more attractive" because if she looked a certain way people would "prefer not see … that face".

In 2019, the Dalai Lama spoke out about his successor, saying that after his death he is likely to be reincarnated in India. He also warned that any Chinese interference in succession should be considered invalid. The Dalai Lama's succession also involves Mongolia, given its strong Tibetan Buddhist ties. The Jebtsundamba Khutuktu, the latest one chosen from Mongolia, is the third most important figure in the Tibetan Buddhist hierarchy, and plays a significant role in the recognition of the next Dalai Lama.

In 2020, the Dalai Lama said he did not support Tibetan independence and hoped to visit China as a Nobel Prize winner. He said "I prefer the concept of a 'republic' in the People's Republic of China. In the concept of a republic, ethnic minorities are like Tibetans, Mongols, Manchus, and Xinjiang Uyghurs. We can live in harmony".

In 2021, he praised India as a role model for religious harmony in the world.

In 2023, a video showed the Dalai Lama in the city of Dharamshala, India, asking a boy for a kiss on the lips, and then to suck his tongue. He later apologized and expressed regret through a statement that claimed he "often teases people he meets in an innocent and playful way, even in public and before cameras" and "regrets the incident".

The Dalai Lama celebrated his 90th birthday on 6 July 2025. Before the celebration, he confirmed that the Gaden Phodrang Trust will supervise the process of appointing a successor after his death, in accordance with tradition. The Chinese government has disputed this practice and argues it has sole authority to select a future Dalai Lama.

== Residences ==
The first Dalai Lama was based at Tashi Lhunpo Monastery, which he founded. The Second to the Fifth Dalai Lamas were mainly based at Drepung Monastery outside Lhasa. In 1645, after the unification of Tibet, the Fifth moved to the ruins of a royal fortress or residence on top of Marpori ('Red Mountain') in Lhasa and decided to build a palace on the same site. This ruined palace, called Tritse Marpo, was originally built around AD 636 by the founder of the Tibetan Empire, Songtsen Gampo, for his Nepalese wife. Amongst the ruins there was just a small temple left where Tsongkhapa had given a teaching when he arrived in Lhasa in the 1380s.

The Fifth Dalai Lama began construction of the Potala Palace on this site in 1645, carefully incorporating what was left of his predecessor's palace into its structure. From then on and until today, unless on tour or in exile the Dalai Lamas have always spent their winters at the Potala Palace and their summers at the Norbulingka palace and park. Both palaces are in Lhasa and approximately 3 km apart.

Following the failed 1959 Tibetan uprising, the 14th Dalai Lama sought refuge in India. Indian Prime Minister Jawaharlal Nehru allowed in the Dalai Lama and the Tibetan government officials. The Dalai Lama has since lived in exile in McLeod Ganj, in the Kangra district of Himachal Pradesh in northern India, where the Central Tibetan Administration is established. His residence on the Temple Road in McLeod Ganj is called the Dalai Lama Temple and is visited by people from across the globe. Tibetan refugees have constructed and opened many schools and Buddhist temples in Dharamshala.

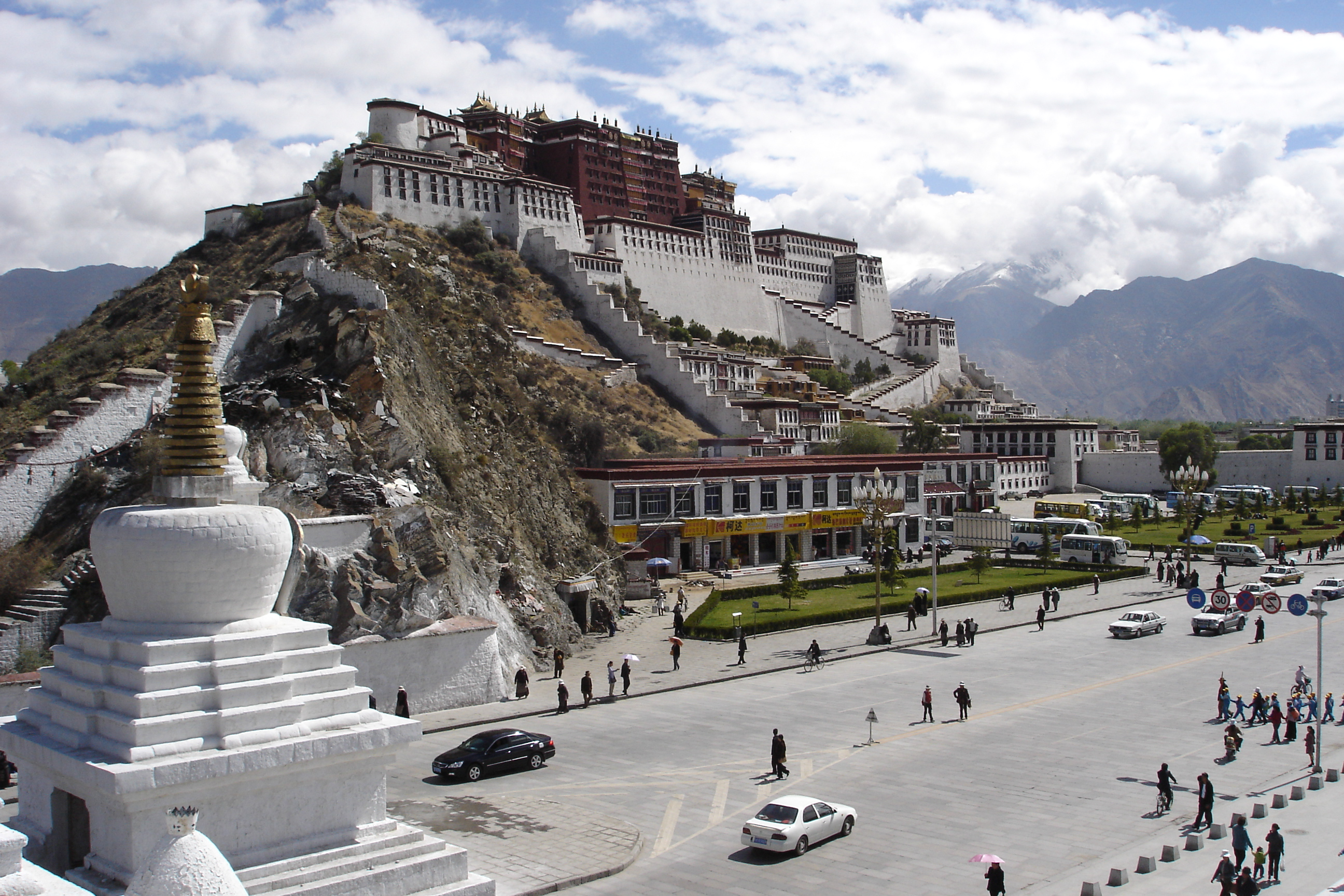
Potala Palace

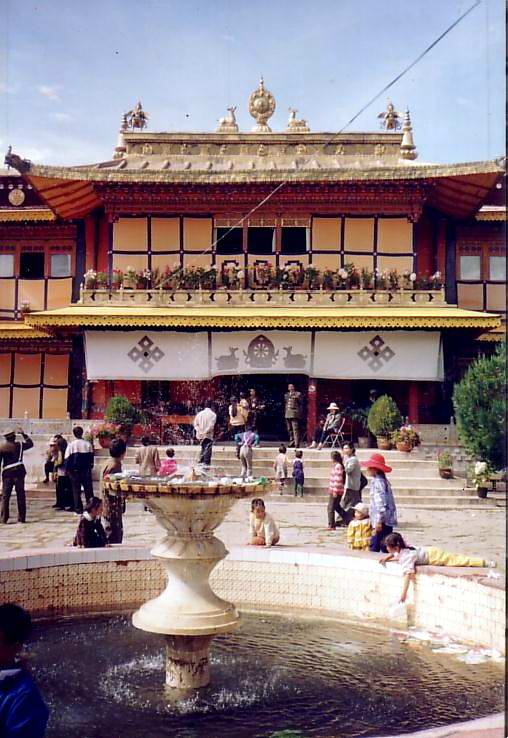
Norbulingka

== Searching for the reincarnation ==
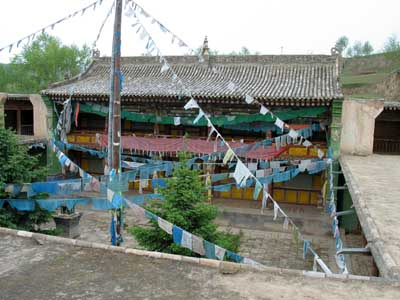
The search for the 14th Dalai Lama took the High Lamas to Taktser in Amdo.

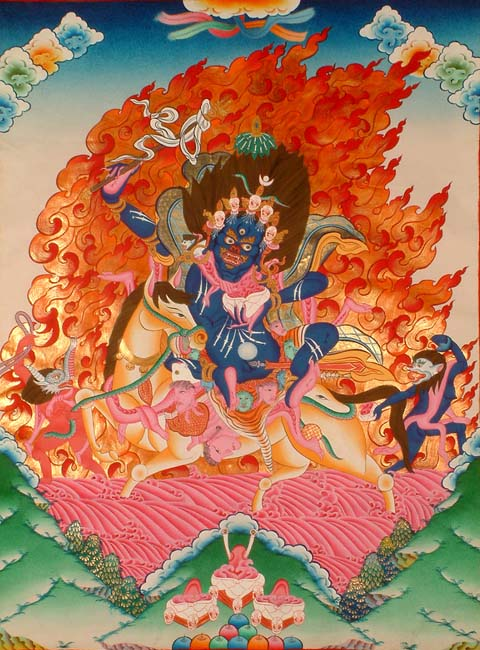
Palden Lhamo, the female guardian spirit of the sacred lake, Lhamo La-tso, who promised Gendun Drup, the 1st Dalai Lama, in one of his visions that "she would protect the 'reincarnation' lineage of the Dalai Lamas"

By the Himalayan tradition, phowa is the discipline that is believed to transfer the mindstream to the intended body. Upon the death of the Dalai Lama and consultation with the Nechung Oracle, a search for the Lama's yangsi, or reincarnation, is conducted. The government of the People's Republic of China has stated its intention to be the ultimate authority on the selection of the next Dalai Lama.

High Lamas may also claim to have a vision by a dream or if the Dalai Lama was cremated, they will often monitor the direction of the smoke as an 'indication' of the direction of the expected rebirth.

If there is only one boy found, the High Lamas will invite Living Buddhas of the three great monasteries, together with secular clergy and monk officials, to 'confirm their findings' and then report to the Central Government through the Minister of Tibet. Later, a group consisting of the three major servants of Dalai Lama, eminent officials, and troops will collect the boy and his family and travel to Lhasa, where the boy would be taken, usually to Drepung Monastery, to study the Buddhist sutra in preparation for assuming the role of spiritual leader of Tibet.

If there are several possible claimed reincarnations, regents, eminent officials, monks at the Jokhang in Lhasa, and the Minister to Tibet have historically made the choice by putting the boys' names inside an urn and drawing one in public.

In his autobiography, Freedom in Exile, the 14th Dalai Lama wrote that after he dies, it is possible that his people will no longer want a Dalai Lama, in which case there would be no search for the Lama's reincarnation. "So, I might take rebirth as an insect, or an animal—whatever would be of most value to the largest number of sentient beings". But shortly before his 90th birthday, he released a statement saying, "I am affirming that the institution of the Dalai Lama will continue." He added that members of the Gaden Phodrang Trust would have exclusive responsibility for recognizing the next Dalai Lama and that "no one else has any such authority to interfere in this matter."

The Dalai Lama is thought to be a type of "living [Buddhist] god".

=== List of Dalai Lamas ===
There have been 14 recognised incarnations of the Dalai Lama:

	Name	Picture	Lifespan	Recognised	Enthronement	Seal of Authority from Central Government	Approval from Central Government	Tibetan/Wylie	Tibetan pinyin/Chinese	Alternative spellings
1	Gendun Drup		1391–1474	–	N/A	N/A	N/A	དགེ་འདུན་འགྲུབ་ dge 'dun 'grub	Gêdün Chub 根敦朱巴	Gedun Drub; Gedün Drup
2	Gendun Gyatso		1475–1542	1483	N/A	N/A	N/A	དགེ་འདུན་རྒྱ་མཚོ་ dge 'dun rgya mtsho	Gêdün Gyaco 根敦嘉措	Gedün Gyatso; Gendün Gyatso
3	Sonam Gyatso		1543–1588	1546	1578	Yes		བསོད་ནམས་རྒྱ་མཚོ་ bsod nams rgya mtsho	Soinam Gyaco 索南嘉措	Sönam Gyatso
4	Yonten Gyatso		1589–1617	1601	1603	Yes		ཡོན་ཏན་རྒྱ་མཚོ་ yon tan rgya mtsho	Yoindain Gyaco 雲丹嘉措	Yontan Gyatso, Yönden Gyatso
5	Ngawang Lobsang Gyatso		1617–1682	1618	1622	Yes		བློ་བཟང་རྒྱ་མཚོ་ blo bzang rgya mtsho	Lobsang Gyaco 羅桑嘉措	Lobzang Gyatso; Lopsang Gyatso
6	Tsangyang Gyatso		1683–1706	1688	1697	No	Yes, in 1721 after death	ཚངས་དབྱངས་རྒྱ་མཚོ་ tshang dbyangs rgya mtsho	Cangyang Gyaco 倉央嘉措	Tsañyang Gyatso
7	Kelzang Gyatso		1707–1757	1712	1720	Yes		བསྐལ་བཟང་རྒྱ་མཚོ་ bskal bzang rgya mtsho	Gaisang Gyaco 格桑嘉措	Kelsang Gyatso; Kalsang Gyatso
8	Jamphel Gyatso		1758–1804	1760	1762	Yes		བྱམས་སྤེལ་རྒྱ་མཚོ་ byams spel rgya mtsho	Qambê Gyaco 強白嘉措	Jampel Gyatso; Jampal Gyatso
9	Lungtok Gyatso		1805–1815	1807	1808	Yes	Yes	ལུང་རྟོགས་རྒྱ་མཚོ་ lung rtogs rgya mtsho	Lungdog Gyaco 隆朵嘉措	Lungtog Gyatso
10	Tsultrim Gyatso		1816–1837	1822	1822		Yes	ཚུལ་ཁྲིམས་རྒྱ་མཚོ་ tshul khrim rgya mtsho	Cüchim Gyaco 楚臣嘉措	Tshültrim Gyatso
11	Khendrup Gyatso		1838–1856	1841	1842	Yes	Yes	མཁས་གྲུབ་རྒྱ་མཚོ་ mkhas grub rgya mtsho	Kaichub Gyaco 凱珠嘉措	Kedrub Gyatso
12	Trinley Gyatso		1857–1875	1858	1860		Yes	འཕྲིན་ལས་རྒྱ་མཚོ་ 'phrin las rgya mtsho	Chinlai Gyaco 成烈嘉措	Trinle Gyatso
13	Thubten Gyatso		1876–1933	1878	1879		Yes	ཐུབ་བསྟན་རྒྱ་མཚོ་ thub bstan rgya mtsho	Tubdain Gyaco 土登嘉措	Thubtan Gyatso; Thupten Gyatso
14	Tenzin Gyatso		born 1935	1939	1940 (in exile since 1959)		No, as Goldstein writes that Tibet did everything to keep the Central Government out of this process. They were asked to show respect and "not permission"	བསྟན་འཛིན་རྒྱ་མཚོ་ bstan 'dzin rgya mtsho	Dainzin Gyaco 丹增嘉措	Tenzin Gyatso

There was also a non-recognised Dalai Lama, Ngawang Yeshe Gyatso, declared 28 June 1707, when he was 25 years old, by Lha-bzang Khan as the "true" 6th Dalai Lama. He was never accepted as such by the majority of the population.

== Future of the position ==
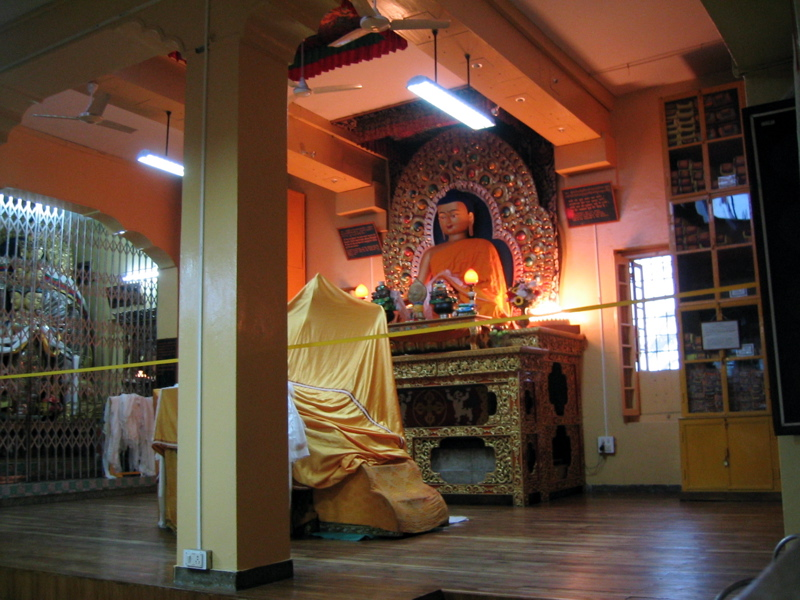
The main teaching room of the Dalai Lama in Dharamshala, India

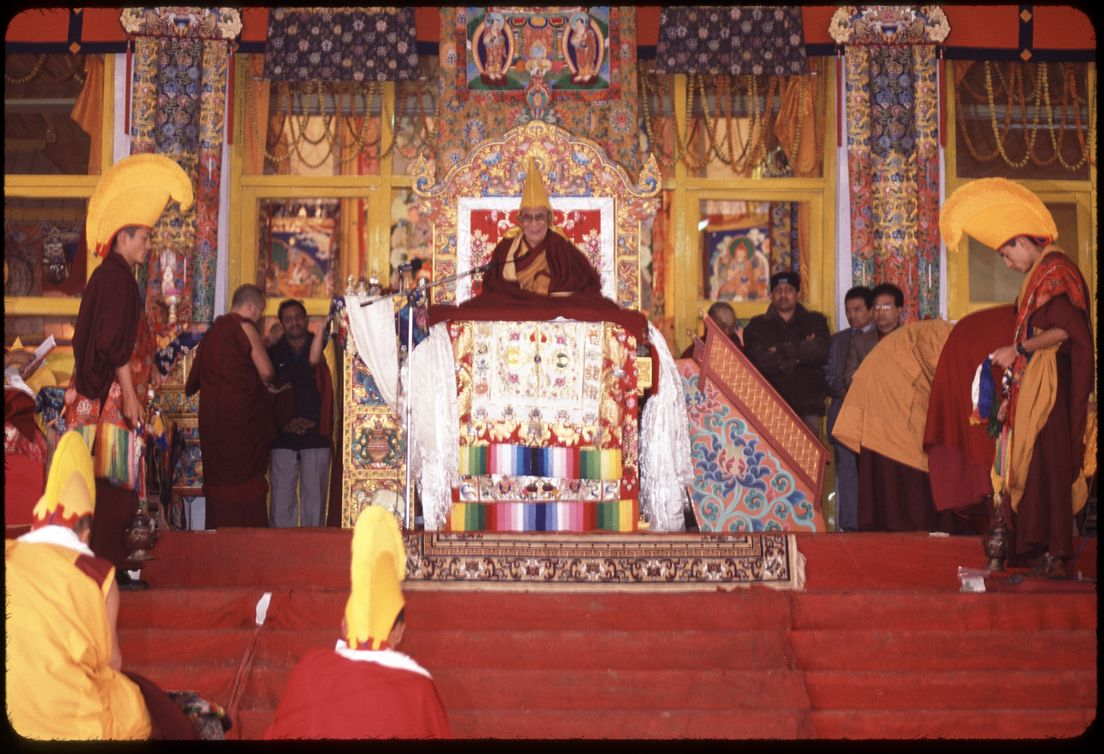
14th Dalai Lama in 2003

In the mid-1970s, Tenzin Gyatso told a Polish newspaper that he thought he would be the last Dalai Lama. In a later interview published in the English language press he stated, "The Dalai Lama office was an institution created to benefit others. It is possible that it will soon have outlived its usefulness." These statements caused a furore amongst Tibetans in India. Many could not believe that such an option could even be considered. It was further felt that it was not the Dalai Lama's decision to reincarnate. Rather, they felt that since the Dalai Lama is a national institution it was up to the people of Tibet to decide whether the Dalai Lama should reincarnate.

The government of the People's Republic of China (PRC) has claimed the power to approve the naming of "high" reincarnations in Tibet, based on a precedent set by the Qianlong Emperor of the Qing dynasty. The Qianlong Emperor instituted a system of selecting the Dalai Lama and the Panchen Lama by a lottery that used a Golden Urn with names wrapped in clumps of barley. This method was used a few times for both positions during the 19th century, but eventually fell into disuse.

In 1995, the Dalai Lama chose to proceed with the selection of the 11th reincarnation of the Panchen Lama without the use of the Golden Urn, while the Chinese government insisted that it must be used. This has led to two rival Panchen Lamas: Gyaincain Norbu as chosen by the Chinese government's process, and Gedhun Choekyi Nyima as chosen by the Dalai Lama. However, Nyima was abducted by the Chinese government shortly after being chosen as the Panchen Lama and has not been seen in public since 1995.

In September 2007, the Chinese government said all high monks must be approved by the government, which would include the selection of the 15th Dalai Lama after the death of Tenzin Gyatso. Since by tradition, the Panchen Lama must approve the reincarnation of the Dalai Lama, that is another possible method of control. Consequently, the Dalai Lama has alluded to the possibility of a referendum to determine the 15th Dalai Lama.

In response to this scenario, Tashi Wangdi, the representative of the 14th Dalai Lama, replied that the Chinese government's selection would be meaningless. "You can't impose an Imam, an Archbishop, saints, any religion...you can't politically impose these things on people", said Wangdi. "It has to be a decision of the followers of that tradition. The Chinese can use their political power: force. Again, it's meaningless. Like their Panchen Lama. And they can't keep their Panchen Lama in Tibet. They tried to bring him to his monastery many times but people would not see him. How can you have a religious leader like that?"

The 14th Dalai Lama said as early as 1969 that it was for the Tibetans to decide whether the institution of the Dalai Lama "should continue or not". He has given reference to a possible vote occurring in the future for all Tibetan Buddhists to decide whether they wish to recognize his rebirth. In response to the possibility that the PRC might attempt to choose his successor, the Dalai Lama said he would not be reborn in a country controlled by the People's Republic of China or any other country which is not free. According to Robert D. Kaplan, this could mean that "the next Dalai Lama might come from the Tibetan cultural belt that stretches across Ladakh, Himachal Pradesh, Nepal, and Bhutan, presumably making him even more pro-Indian and hence anti-Chinese".

The 14th Dalai Lama supported the possibility that his next incarnation could be a woman. As an "engaged Buddhist" the Dalai Lama has an appeal straddling cultures and political systems making him one of the most recognized and respected moral voices today. "Despite the complex historical, religious and political factors surrounding the selection of incarnate masters in the exiled Tibetan tradition, the Dalai Lama is open to change", author Michaela Haas writes.

Despite the tradition of selecting young children, the 14th Dalai Lama can also name an adult as his next incarnation. Doing so would have the advantage that the successor would not need to spend decades studying Buddhism and could immediately be taken seriously as a leader by the Tibetan diaspora. The Dalai Lama has said that he will reveal a plan for deciding on his successor on his 90th birthday, July 6, 2025.

On July 2, 2025, the Dalai Lama released a statement saying, "I am affirming that the institution of the Dalai Lama will continue." He also wrote that members of the Gaden Phodrang Trust have exclusive responsibility for recognizing his successor.

== See also ==
- Golden Urn
- 29-Article Ordinance for the More Effective Governing of Tibet
- CIA Tibetan program
- Index of Buddhism-related articles
- Tibetan Buddhism
  - Gelug
    - List of Dalai Lamas
    - Panchen Lama
- History of Tibet
  - List of rulers of Tibet
  - 14th Dalai Lama
- Engaged spirituality
- Patron and priest relationship
