= Yeshe Gyatso =

Tibetan Dalai Lama pretender

Yeshe Gyatso (Wylie: Ye shes rgya mtsho) (1686–1725) was a pretender for the position of the 6th Dalai Lama of Tibet. Declared by Lhazang Khan of the Khoshut Khanate on June 28, 1707, he was the only unofficial Dalai Lama. While praised for his personal moral qualities, he was not recognized by the bulk of the Tibetans and Mongols and is not counted in the official list of the Dalai Lamas.

== Appointment as Dalai Lama ==
Pekar Dzinpa, later known as Yeshe Gyatso, was born in 1686 near the banks of Dzun Khulkhawa Karpo in Kham. He may have been the natural son of the Khoshut prince Lhazang Khan. He entered the Drepung Monastery at a young age in 1699 and later moved to the Chakpori Hill in Lhasa, where he stayed at the medical college. The Khoshut rulers were protector-kings of Tibet from 1642 to 1717, but had a limited political role since the Dalai Lama or his desi (regent) held most of the authority. The ambitious Lhazang Khan succeeded to the royal dignity in 1703 and set out to change this. In 1705, he eliminated the powerful desi Sangye Gyatso and then moved against the young 6th Dalai Lama, Tsangyang Gyatso, whose libertine conduct he purported to resent. Tsangyang Gyatso was arrested and declared deposed. The king, collaborating with the imperial Chinese authorities, dispatched the prisoner towards the Qing Dynasty court in Beijing. However, Tsangyang Gyatso died on the way in November 1706, either murdered or succumbing to illness. At this time Pekar Dzinpa was still a lama at the Chakpori medical college. Now Lhazang Khan pointed out the young man as the real 6th Dalai Lama. He officially proclaimed his supposed son in 1707 under the pretext that Tsangyang Gyatso had been erroneously initiated as the reincarnation of the 5th Dalai Lama (d. 1682). The Panchen Lama gave him both novice vows and the vows of full ordination at a grand ceremony before the Jowo image in Lhasa. As Dalai Lama he received the name Ngawang Yeshe Gyatso, or Yeshe Gyatso for short. In Beijing the Kangxi Emperor initially supported the claim and issued an official recognition on 10 April 1710, thus dunning the Tibetans to recognize him and obey Lhazang Khan.

== Contested claims ==
The new Dalai Lama was praised for his moral behaviour and considered a great holder of religious authority. Nevertheless, the vast majority of the Tibetans and Mongols regarded the young man as an usurper and imposter, and he was never recognized by the Buddhist clergy. People irreverently referred to him as Kuzhap Pekar Dzinpa (Mr. Pekar Dzinpa). Shortly afterwards, Tibetans in Eastern Tibet announced that they had found the reincarnation of the recently deceased Tsangyang Gyatso, thus the 7th Dalai Lama, near Lithang in the province of Kham. The boy had been born in September 1708, and would later be known by the name Kelzang Gyatso. He was recognized by two Khoshut princes in Amdo and caught the interest of the Kangxi Emperor. Seeing the boy as a possible means of increasing Qing influence in Tibet, he brought him to the Kumbum Monastery, out of reach of Lhazang Khan.

Tibet was suddenly overrun by an invasion by the Dzungar people in 1717. Lhazang Khan was killed in battle in Lhasa in November in the same year, and the country was occupied by the newcomers, who led a hard rule. The Dzungar leaders considered Yeshe Gyatso an imposter and deposed him. The Panchen Lama Lobsang Yeshe pleaded with the Dzungar not to kill the young man or his siblings, but did not receive a clear reply. However, Yeshe Gyatso was not ill-treated but merely confined to the Chakpori medical college.

The Dzungar occupation of Tibet lasted until 1720 when a Qing expedition expelled the occupants. Kelzang Gyatso was brought from Kumbum to Lhasa in the same year and enthroned in the Potala on 15 October 1720. Yeshe Gyatso was taken out from Chakpori. His fate is not entirely clear from the sources, but it seems that he was deported to China where he died in 1725. During the Losar festival in early 1726 the 7th Dalai Lama blessed the merits of the deceased Yeshe Gyatso, indicating that any hostility between the rival Dalai Lamas had ceased by this time due to Yeshe Gyatso's loss of political significance. The latter must nevertheless have had some followers, since his supposed reincarnation was discovered in Kham. However, the child soon died from smallpox and no more incarnations were reported.

== See also ==
- Politics in Tibet
- Mongol conquest of Tibet
- Chinese expedition to Tibet (1720)
