= 7th Dalai Lama =

Spiritual leader of Tibet from 1720 to 1757

7th Dalai Lama, Kelzang Gyatso
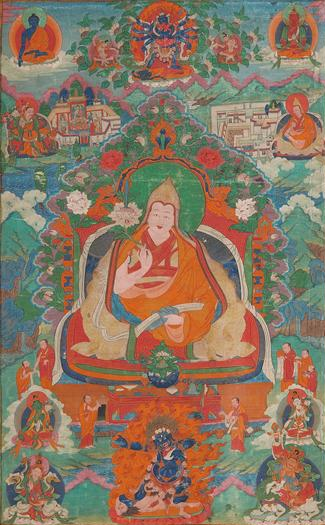
- 7th Dalai Lama of Tibet in 18th century thangka art
- Title: His Holiness the 7th Dalai Lama

Personal life
- Born: 1708 Lithang, Kham
- Died: 1757 (aged 48–49) Tibet

Religious life
- Religion: Tibetan Buddhism, Gelug school

Senior posting
- Period in office: 1720–1757
- Predecessor: 6th Dalai Lama, Tsangyang Gyatso
- Successor: 8th Dalai Lama, Jamphel Gyatso

Military service

Chinese name
- Chinese: 格桑嘉措
Transcriptions

Tibetan name
- Tibetan: བསྐལ་བཟང་རྒྱ་མཚོ་
Transcriptions
- Wylie: bSkal bZang rGya mTsho

The 7th Dalai Lama, Kelzang Gyatso (Tibetan: བསྐལ་བཟང་རྒྱ་མཚོ, Wylie: bskal bzang rgya mtsho, also spelled Kalzang Gyatso, Kelsang Gyatso and Kezang Gyatso) (1708–1757), was recognized as the authentic 7th Dalai Lama of Tibet. He was seen as the true incarnation of the 6th Dalai Lama, and was enthroned after a pretender supported by the Koshut Khan was deposed.

The 7th Dalai Lama was widely regarded as a great scholar, a prolific writer and a poet. His collected works run seven volumes and contain numerous commentaries, liturgical works as well as many religious poems.

== Early life ==
Kelzang Gyatso was born in Lithang of Eastern Tibet or Kham, in the present-day Garzê Tibetan Autonomous Prefecture of present-day Sichuan province. At that time, the Dalai Lama's throne in Lhasa was occupied by Ngawang Yeshey Gyatso, who had been installed by Lhazang Khan as "the real 6th Dalai Lama" in place of Tsangyang Gyatso. Ngawang Yeshey Gyatso still held this position (though most Tibetans did not consider him to be a legitimate Dalai Lama) when a monk at Litang monastery, spontaneously channeling the Nechung Oracle, identified Kelzang Gyatso as the reincarnation of Tsangyang Gyatso. Since this presented a contradiction of Lhazang Khan's Dalai Lama, it was a controversial matter and potentially dangerous to the child. Subsequently, the Tibetan leader of a delegation from Lhasa covertly confirmed that the child was Tsangyang Gyatso's reincarnation. The child was quietly taken into Litang monastery for protection and training. In 1715, the Kangxi Emperor sponsored Kelzang Gyatso's entrance into Kumbum Monastery. This entrance was marked by formal ceremonies due to a Dalai Lama and thus signified a public challenge to Lhazang Khan's Dalai Lama. He was ordained by Ngawang Lobsang Tenpai Gyaltsen. His reign started when he was 12.

While still a boy, Kelzang Gyatso demonstrated himself a prodigy of profound wisdom. Kelzang Gyatso became famous for his ability to spontaneously compose verse. Inspired by a sambhogakaya vision of the poet-monk Tsongkhapa, Kelzang Gyatso (whilst a youth), travelled to central Tibet where he gave a sermon before thousands of people.

"Of all the Gyalwa Rinpoche [Dalai Lamas], we Tibetans probably respect the seventh, Kalzang Gyatso, most of all because of his saintliness, because he devoted his whole life to the Three Precious Ones, seeking refuge not for himself but for all his people."

The Dzungars invaded Tibet in 1717, deposed Ngawang Yeshey Gyatso, which met with widespread approval, and killed Lhazang Khan. However, they soon began to loot, rape and kill throughout Lhasa, destroying Tibetan goodwill towards them. They also destroyed a small force sent by the Kangxi Emperor at the Battle of the Salween River in 1718 to support clear traditional trade routes.

Many Nyingmapa and Bonpos were executed and Tibetans visiting Dzungar officials were forced to stick their tongues out so the Dzungars could tell if the person recited constant mantras (which was said to make the tongue black or brown). This allowed them to pick the Nyingmapa and Bonpos, who recited many magic-mantras. This habit of sticking one's tongue out as a mark of respect on greeting someone has remained a Tibetan custom until recent times.

== Enthronement ==
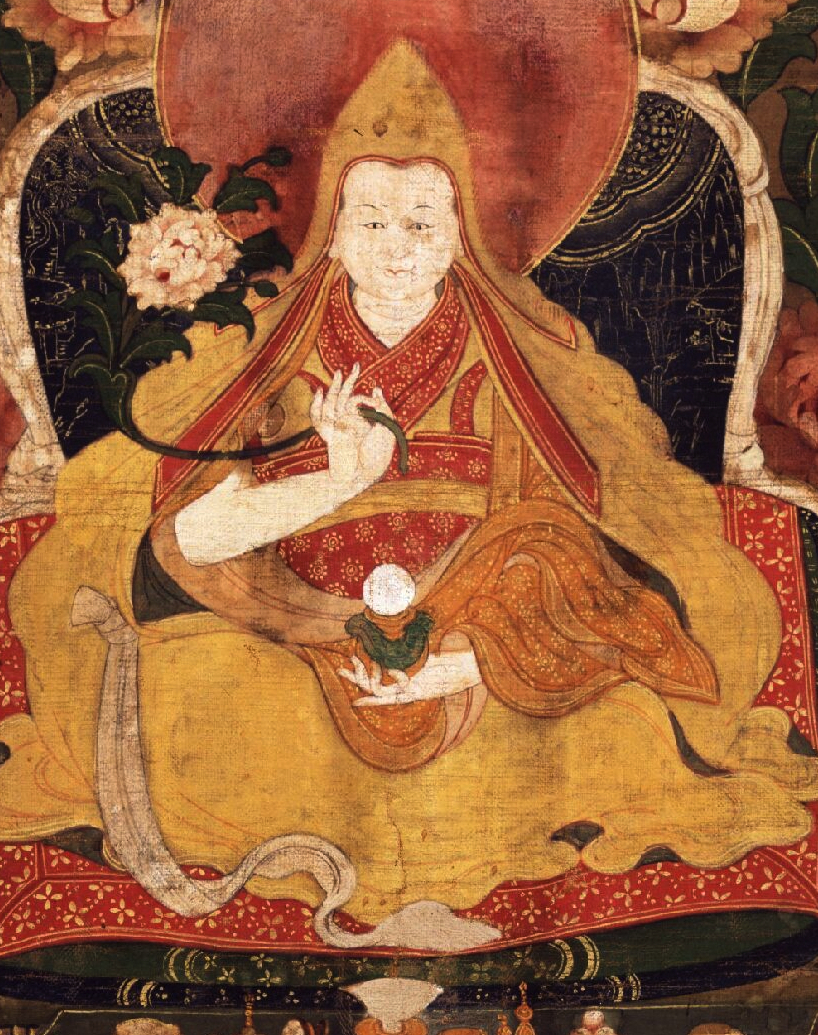
7th Dalai Lama, Kelzang Gyatso in Tibetan painting

A second and larger expedition sent by the Kangxi Emperor, together with Tibetan forces under Polhane (also spelled Pho-lha-nas) of Tsang and Gangchenney (also spelled Kang-chen-nas), the governor of Western Tibet, expelled the Dzungars from Tibet in 1720. They brought Kelzang Gyatso with them from Kumbum to Lhasa and he was enthroned as the seventh Dalai Lama in the Potala in 1721, or in November 1720. He took the novice vows of monk-hood from the 5th Panchen Lama Lobsang Yeshi, who gave him the name Kelsang Gyatso. He took the Gelong vows (full ordination) from Lobsang Yeshi in 1726. He received teachings from the tutor of Lobsang Yeshi, the Abbot of Gyumey Monastery and also from the Abbot of Shalu Monastery, Ngawang Yonten on all the major Buddhist philosophical treatises and became a master in both sutra and tantra. He was a great scholar and wrote many books, especially on the tantra. He was also a noted poet who, unlike the 6th Dalai Lama, Tsangyang Gyatso, dwelt mainly on spiritual themes.

In 1727 Gangchenney was assassinated by a faction of nationalist and anti-Chinese government ministers, supported by the Kelzang Gyatso's father, his wife and sister were also brutally murdered by the conspirators. This led to a civil war (1727–28), with Pholhane and his forces and the army of the Kangxi emperor eventually defeating the nationalists and executing many of them after trials. While Kalzang Gyatso was not involved in the revolt, he was exiled by Pholhane, under Manchu pressure, to his hometown of Litang in Kham, arriving there in March, 1729. He was allowed to return to the Potala in 1735 (Luciano Petech, China and Tibet in the Early XVIIIth Century (Leiden: Brill, 1972): 114–175.

The Kangxi Emperor (1654–1722; reigned 1661–1722) declared Tibet a protectorate of the Qing Empire and in 1727 installed two high commissioners, or Ambans, and a garrison of Qing troops from China in Lhasa. The walls of Lhasa were torn down and "Kham (with Batang, Litang, Tatsienlu, etc.) annexed to the Chinese province of Sichuan. The Qing protectorate, which was to last till the end of the Qing dynasty (1912), was established."

== Removal of the Regents and establishment of the Kashag ==
There are two main versions of how this occurred. The Chinese version is that:

In 1751, the Qianlong Emperor (1711–1799; ruled 1737–1796) issued a 13-point decree which abolished the position of Regent (Desi), put the Tibetan government in the hands of a four-man Kashag, or Council of Ministers, and gave the ambans formal powers. The Dalai Lama moved back to Lhasa to preside (in name) over the new government.

The Tibetan version has it that:

In 1751, at the age of forty-three, Kelzang Gyatso constituted the "Kashag" or council of ministers to administer the Tibetan government and the abolished the post of Regent or Desi, as it placed too much power in one man's hand and the Dalai Lama became the spiritual and political leader of Tibet.

"The 'king' or governor of Tibet was no longer appointed by the Chinese after 1750, and the Dalai Lama was tacitly recognized as sovereign of Tibet, with the exception of Kham and Amdo on the one hand and, on the other, Ladakh — which was at first under Moghul suzerainty before being annexed by Kashmir after the Dogra war (1834–1842)."

In 1753, Kelzang Gyatso founded the Tse-School in the Potala Palace and built the new palace of Norling Kalsang Phodrang at the Norbulingka. "At the request of the Shabdung Rinpoche Jigmi Dagpa (1724–1761), spiritual and temporal ruler of Bhutan, Dalai Lama VII helped in the creation of a gold-and-copper monastery roof in Bhutan."

== Notes ==
Buddhist titles
Preceded by Tsangyang Gyatso	Dalai Lama; 1720–1757	Succeeded by Jamphel Gyatso
