= Narthang Monastery =

Tibetan Buddhist monastery near Shigatse, Tibet, China

Narthang Monastery Nartang Monastery
- Tibetan transcription(s); Tibetan: སྣར་ཐང་ Wylie transliteration: snar thang Chinese transcription(s); Simplified: 纳塘寺; Pinyin: nàtángsì
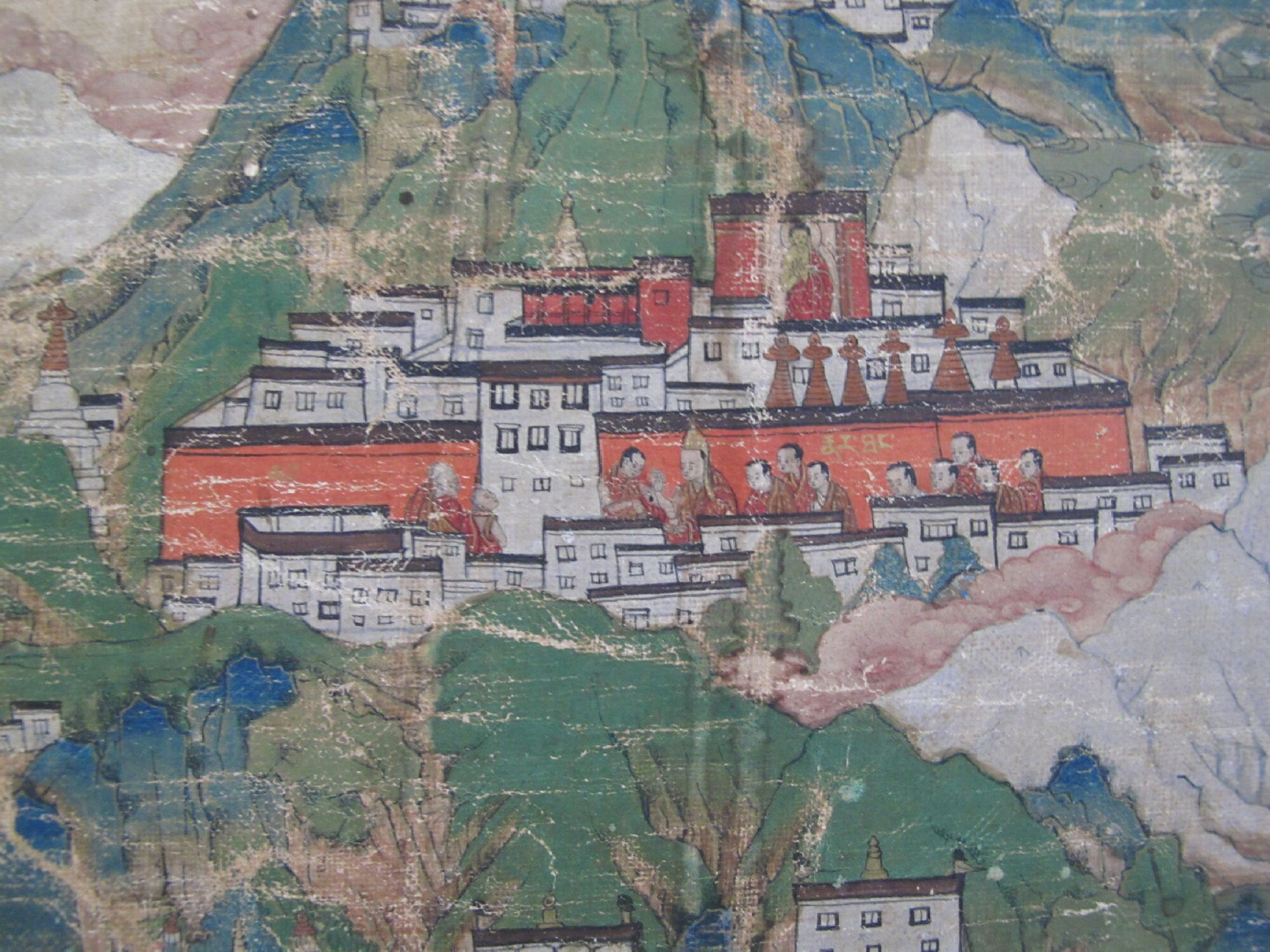

- Location within Tibet

Religion
- Affiliation: Tibetan Buddhism
- Sect: Kadampa

Location
- Location: Shigatse, Tibet
- Country: China
- Coordinates: 29.1910842°N 88.7642799°E

Architecture
- Founder: Tumtön Lodrö Drakpa
- Established: 1153; 873 years ago

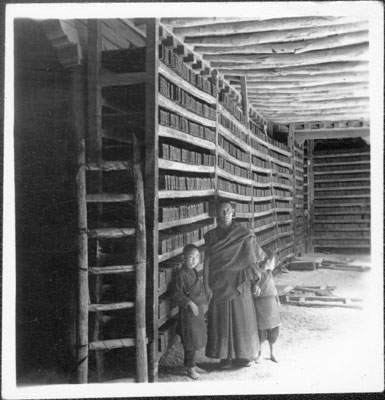
Racks of printing blocks, Narthang Monastery

Narthang Monastery is a monastery located 15 km (9.3 mi) west of Shigatse in Tibet. Founded in 1153 by Tumtön Lodrö Drakpa, a student of Sharawa Yonten Drak. Narthang was an influential Kadam monastery, and the fourth great monastery of Tsang, with Shalu Monastery, Sakya and Tashilhunpo. Narthang was first famous for its scriptural teaching and monastic discipline. After the fourteenth century it gained great eminence as the oldest of Tibet's three great printing centres (the other being the Potala and the Derge).

With help from the fourth Panchen Lama, the fifth Dalai Lama alongside Sönam Rapten and Güshi Khan assimilated the Monastery as a branch of Tashi Lhunpo Monastery. The fifth Panchen Lama invested in restoration projects for the monastery and it continued printing the Buddhist scriptures, the Kangyur and the Tengyur, until 1959. Narthang's five main buildings and large chanting hall were razed to the ground by the Chinese in 1966. They had contained priceless 14th century murals possibly painted by the artist scholars of nearby Shalu Monastery. Today, only the mud-brick foundations can be discerned although parts of the Mongolian styled high-fortress walls are still standing.

"I went on to Narthang to visit the largest of the printing establishments in Tibet. The number of engraved wooden plates used for the printing of the various religious books was prodigious. Set up on shelves, in rows, they filled a huge building. The printers, splattered with ink up to their elbows, sat upon the floor as they worked, while in other rooms monks cut the paper according to the size required for each kind of book. There was no haste; chatting and drinking of buttered tea went on freely. What a contrast to the fevered agitation in our newspaper printing-rooms."

"The high crumbling walls of Narthang are visible behind a roadside village: a few monks have returned to the lamasery and several minor buildings have been restored."

An English-language history of Narthang between the 12th and 15th centuries is available.
