= Michaela Haas =

German reporter, TV-host, and author

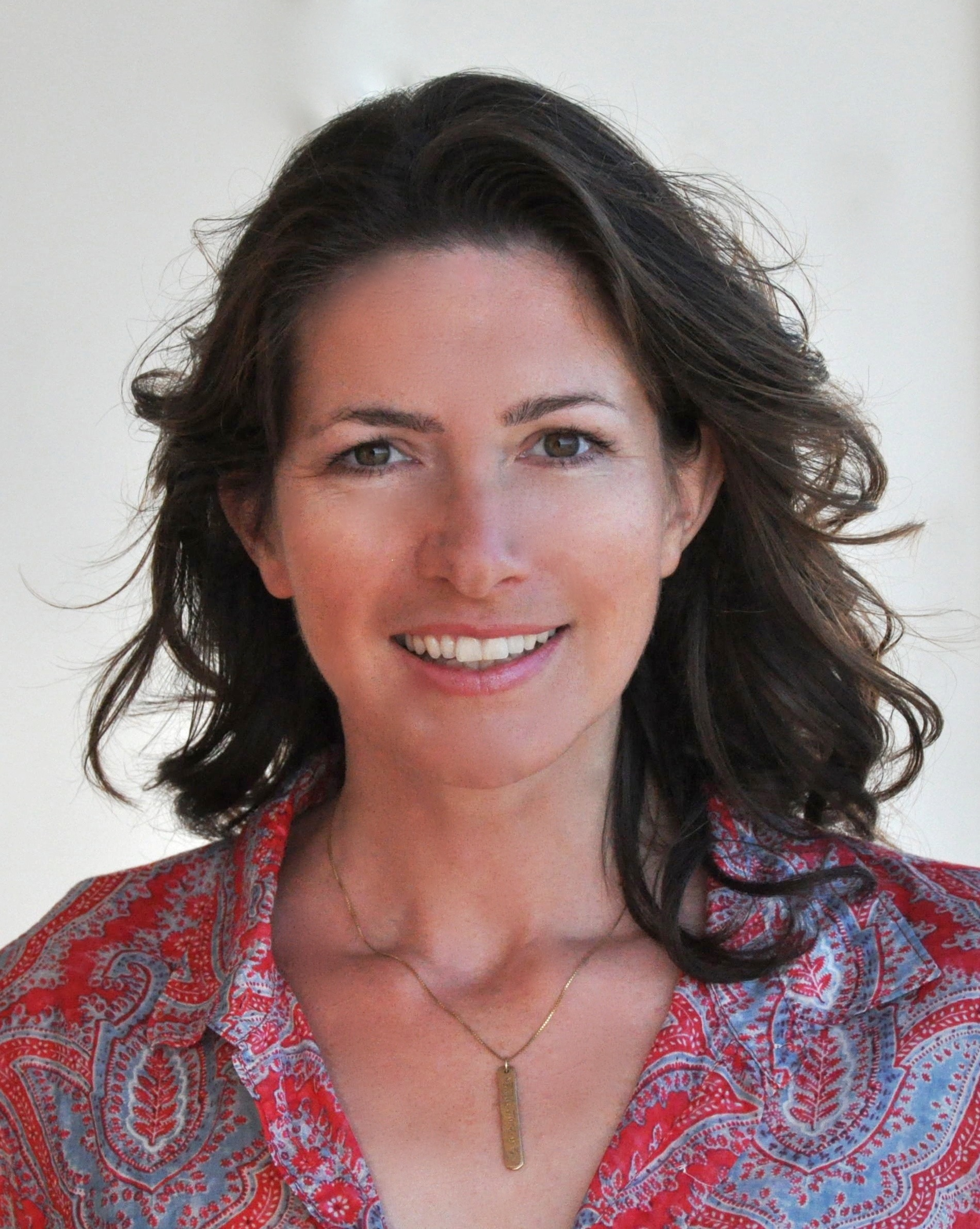
Haas in 2012

Michaela Haas is a German reporter, TV-host, and author. She is the author of Bouncing Forward: Transforming Bad Breaks into Breakthroughs (Atria/Enliven, 2015), Crazy America (RandomHouse/Goldmann, 2017), Dakini Power (Shambhala, 2013) and co-author of The Ghetto-Swinger (1996). She has hosted talkshows and political as well as cultural broadcasts in Germany such as Kulturweltspiegel (ARD), Unter Vier Augen (BR), WestART (WDR), Boulevard Europa (WDR). She is a contributing editor for David Byrne's Reasons to Be Cheerful, a columnist for the Süddeutsche Zeitung, and she has contributed to magazines and newspapers, including the New York Times, the Huffington Post, Mother Jones, Al Jazeera, and Rotary International Magazine.

== Biography ==
In 1996, she co-authored her first non-fiction book. "Coco Schumann, the Ghetto-Swinger" is the true story of a Jewish entertainer who survived the Nazi-Camps by playing for his life.

After completing her education as a journalist at the Deutsche Journalistenschule in Munich and earning her degree as master journalist from LMU Munich, she was offered the post of staff reporter for the Seite Drei of the Süddeutsche Zeitung.

At the age of 23, she started hosting Live aus dem Alabama, a popular weekly 90 minute live TV talk show for young people.

In 1997, she left Germany to follow her passion for traveling and studying while working as a freelance correspondent from Nepal, North India and France. She enrolled in Kathmandu University in Nepal, to pursue studies of Sanskrit and Tibetan Buddhism for two years and has finished her PhD thesis in Asian studies at the University of Bonn in 2008.

In addition to her media career, Haas is the founding owner of Haas live! Communication, Coaching, Consulting, a coaching company which specializes in media and presentation training for business leaders and media professionals. She lives in Munich, Germany and Los Angeles, California. She is the author of a book about posttraumatic growth, "Bouncing Forward: Transforming Bad Breaks into Breakthroughs" (Atria/Enliven, 2015) and a book about female teachers of Tibetan Buddhism in the West, Dakini Power: Twelve Extraordinary Women Shaping The Transmission of Tibetan Buddhism in the West, published by Snow Lion/Shambhala in 2013.

She has also taught as a visiting scholar and lecturer at the University of California, Santa Barbara, is a member of the Solutions Journalism Network and publishes a weekly solutions column for the Süddeutsche Zeitung.

== Works ==
- Crazy America: Eine Liebeserklärung an ein durchgeknalltes Land (RandomHouse/Goldmann, 2017)
- Bouncing Forward: The Art and Science of Cultivating Resilience (Atria/Enliven, 2015)
- Dakini Power: Twelve Extraordinary Women Shaping the Transmission of Tibetan Buddhism in the West (Shambhala/Snow Lion, 2013)
- Coco Schumann, The Ghetto Swinger (DoppelHouse Press, 2016)
