= Voice for the Voiceless (book) =

2025 book by Tenzin Gyatso, the 14th Dalai Lama

- Author: Tenzin Gyatso, the 14th Dalai Lama
- Language: English
- Publisher: HarperCollins
- Publication date: March 11, 2025
- Publication place: United States
- Media type: Book
- Pages: 256
- ISBN: 9780063391390

Voice for the Voiceless: Over Seven Decades of Struggle With China for My Land and My People is a 2025 book by Tenzin Gyatso, the 14th Dalai Lama. The book is a "personal and definitive" account of his life's work and his vision for the future.

== Contents ==
Gyatso writes about his dialogue with Chinese leaders regarding the independence of Tibet. He notes his realization that the effort at secession would end fruitlessly. Instead, he pivoted to securing more autonomy for the Tibetan people within China. Gyatso also provides advice on dealing with tumultuous political situations.
