= Protests and uprisings in Tibet since 1950 =

Protests and uprisings against the government of the People's Republic of China have occurred in Tibet since 1950, and include the 1959 uprising, the 2008 uprising, and the subsequent self-immolation protests.

Flag of Tibet

Over the years the Tibetan government in exile, the Central Tibetan Administration (CTA), has shifted the goal of its resistance stance from attempting measured cooperation with autonomy, to demanding full independence, to seeking "genuine autonomy for all Tibetans living in the three traditional provinces of Tibet within the framework of the People's Republic of China". However, not all exiled Tibetans are content with pursuing the current CTA policy of the Middle Way Approach and many expressed their frustration in 2008, against the Dalai Lama's wishes, by agitating for independence.

With the 14th Dalai Lama announcing his retirement from political life just before the April 2011 elections for Sikyong (Prime Minister) who will henceforth be Tibet's political leader, the nature of resistance may be moving into yet another phase, although the three leading candidates currently favor the Middle Way Approach.

== Background ==
Isolated geography has naturally defined Tibet as a unique entity, however, its governance and political status have been in flux for centuries. The minor kingdoms and tribal states of the region were first united under Songtsen Gampo to form the Tibetan Empire in the seventh century CE. Under the influence of his Chinese bride and first Nepali wife Bhrikuti, the Emperor converted to Buddhism and established it as the religion of Tibet. An influx of Chinese culture, the Indian alphabet, and Buddhist monks followed, combining with the native customs and animistic religion Bön to give birth to what has become today's ethnic Tibetan people and Tibetan Buddhism, also known as Lamaism.

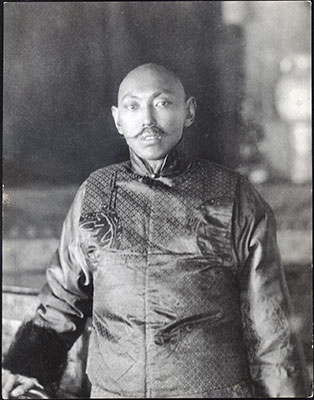
Thubten Gyatso, the 13th Dalai Lama photographed in Calcutta in 1910 who declared Independence of Tibet in 1913 by written proclamation

After the break-up of the Tibetan Empire in the mid-9th century, central rule was largely nonexistent over the region for 400 years. But Buddhism survived and when the Mongols conquered the region, Buddhism was adopted as the official religion of their empire. In 1271, Kublai Khan established the Yuan Dynasty and Tibet remained a semi-autonomous entity within it. From the second half of the 14th century until the early 17th, Tibet was ruled by competing Buddhist schools. However, it was during this period that the Gelug order was founded in 1409 and the institution of the Dalai Lama was established in 1569 with the priest-patron relationship between the Altan Khan and the 3rd Dalai Lama (the first two were bestowed the title retroactively). The Dalai Lamas are said to be the reincarnates of the Bodhisattva of Compassion, Avalokiteśvara.

It was when the 5th Dalai Lama Ngawang Lobsang Gyatso succeeded in establishing the Ganden Phodrang government and Gelug supremacy in Tibet, with the help of the Güshi Khan of the Khoshut Khanate, that the post took on the dual role of political and religious leadership (however, the 9th–12th Dalai Lamas died before adulthood). After Lobsang Gyatso's mortal passing in 1682, which was kept a secret for 15 years, there was a period of anarchy and invasions that eventually led to the establishment of Qing protectorate over Tibet in 1720 that would reach its peak in the 1790s in response to attacks by Nepal, be renewed in 1903 when the British invaded, and would last until 1912. Tibet became independent with the demise of the Manchu Qing dynasty and would remain so until 1950.

== Early resistance, 1950–1958 ==
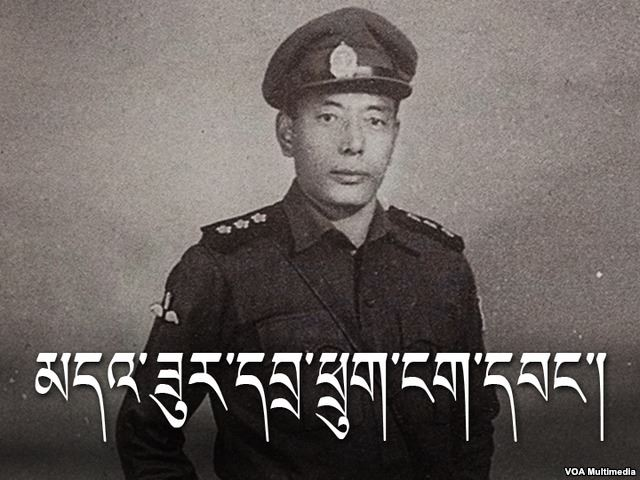
2013 screenshot of Ratuk Ngawang in Special Frontier Force uniform from video of Voice of America's Kunleng Tibetan program interview about Chushi Gangdruk or Four Rivers, Six Ranges Tibetan resistance force and its role in the safe passage of the 14th Dalai Lama to India.

In his essay Hidden Tibet: History of Independence and Occupation published by the Library of Tibetan Works and Archives at Dharamsala, S.L. Kuzmin, quoting the memoirs of Soviet diplomat A. M. Ledovsky, claims that on January 22, 1950, during his negotiations with Joseph Stalin in Moscow, Mao Zedong asked him to provide an aviation regiment because he was preparing to advance towards Tibet. Stalin approved these preparations and provided military support with Soviet pilots and airfield personnel dressed in Chinese clothes, because this aid was illegal. In 1950, the People's Liberation Army of the People's Republic of China (PRC) entered Tibet and the US government made contact with the Dalai Lama's brother Gyalo Thondup, who was living in India, to offer US help, which was rejected. In May 1951, a delegation representing the 14th Dalai Lama, 15 years old at the time, and led by Ngapoi Ngawang Jigmei, traveled to Beijing to be presented with the Seventeen Point Agreement for the Peaceful Liberation of Tibet, which established a PRC sovereignty over Tibet: assuming responsibility for Tibet's external affairs while leaving the domestic governance to the Lhasa government and assuring religious freedoms. The treaty was signed by the Lhasa delegation and the 10th Panchen Lama, who had already switched his loyalty to the PRC after flirting with the Kuomintang and conspiring against the central Tibetan government, which still refused to recognize him as the true Panchen Llama. Later there would be much controversy over the validity of the agreement stemming from claims it was signed under threat of arms and disagreements about whether the delegates had the authority to sign.

But at the time, in Lhasa, the Kutra aristocrats mingled with Chinese officials and prospered from this association. Mixed parties were thrown throughout the year and even by the Dalai Lama himself. The burden on farmers and peasants of supplying the troops with food led to shortages and rising prices, coupled with influenza and smallpox outbreaks, weighted heavy on the majority of Tibetans, who were only marginally surviving before. Protests called "people's assemblies" began in Lhasa, where organizers sent letters of grievances to the government and posted anti-Chinese slogans in public places. The leaders were promptly arrested and the protests stifled.(106–108)

In early 1952, Thondup returned to Lhasa with an economic reform plan that would include lowering taxes and land reform. With the Dalai Lama in agreement, Thondup went about implementing the reforms only to meet with strong resistance from the wealthy old guard who labeled him a radical communist. The label sparked the interests of the Chinese who invited him to Beijing to study, but instead he fled back to India, where he began working with the CIA to form and train a Tibetan insurgency. Again the US tried to convince the Dalai Lama to do the same with an offer of "full aid and assistance", but he refused.

The Dalai Lama saw the need to modernize Tibet and was open to Marxism.

It was only when I went to China in 1954–55 that I actually studied Marxist ideology and learned the history of the Chinese revolution. Once I understood Marxism, my attitude changed completely. I was so attracted to Marxism, I even expressed my wish to become a Communist Party member. Tibet at the time was very, very backward [...] Marxism talked about self-reliance, without depending on a creator or a God. That was very attractive. [...] I still think that if a genuine communist movement had come to Tibet, there would have been much benefit to the people. Instead the Chinese communists brought Tibet so-called liberation.[...] They started destroying monasteries and killing and arresting lamas.

— 14th Dalai Lama

On the Tibetan leader's journey home from his year in China, Khampa and Amdowa clan leaders informed his chief of staff of their plans to rebel against the Chinese in retribution for land confiscation and attacks on monasteries. But all was relatively quiet in Lhasa and in April 1956 he received a Chinese delegation to inaugurate the Preparatory Committee for the Autonomous Region of Tibet: a 51-man committee composed mostly of Tibetans. Meanwhile, open rebellion began with the massacre of a Communist garrison in Kham which left an estimated 800 Chinese dead, sparking air strikes that killed more Tibetans. In addition, the CIA met with the Dalai Lama's two brothers Thubten Jigme Norbu and Gyalo Thondup in India and offered to train a pilot group of six Khampas in guerrilla warfare and radio communications in Saipan. They were smuggled out of Tibet and would later be parachuted back in to train others and to report back to the CIA on the insurgency's progress and needs.

According to the Dalai Lama, his visit to India in November 1956, during which he met with Tibetan "freedom fighters" which included two of his elder brothers, "spoiled good relations with China." The exiles encouraged him to stay and join their fight for independence but Indian Prime Minister Jawaharlal Nehru warned him that India could not offer support. Chinese Premier Zhou Enlai, who was also in Delhi, assured him of Mao's decision to postpone for six years further reforms in Tibet. Both Nehru and Enlai counseled the Lama to return to Lhasa.

Chushi Gangdruk flag

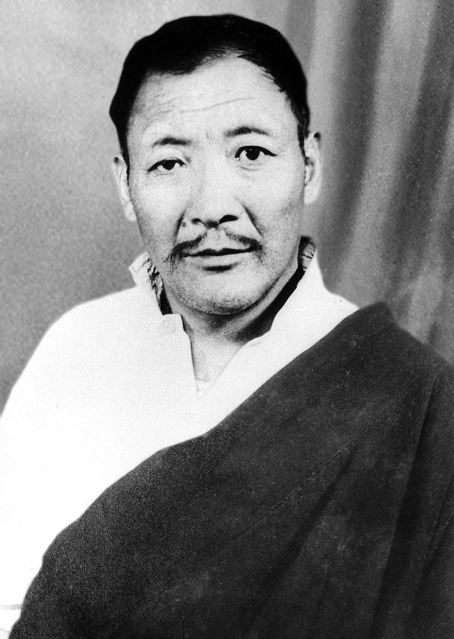
Andrug Gompo Tashi commonly known as "Gonpo Tashi" Andrugtsang before 1959

Although the Chinese let up on reforms, they continued military operations in the areas in rebellion, causing thousands of refugees to gather around Lhasa. In July 1957, the Dalai Lama hosted a large ceremony in the Potala Palace, during which he accepted a golden throne and petition from representatives of the Chushi Gangdruk Tibetan resistance movement, and in return gave them a blessing touch on their foreheads, and issued them with a talisman. They would soon become a 5,000-man strong "Defenders of the Faith Volunteer Army" under the leadership of Gompo Tashi Andrugtsang that would struggle against the Chinese for years. However, in September 1957 when the first two CIA trainees dropped into Tibet to deliver a message from the CIA offering support to the Tibetan leader, it was refused. The second drop of four men was disastrous: only one managed to escape alive. Meanwhile, by 1958 Gompo's army was doing quite well taking control of large portions of central Tibet.

== 1959 Tibetan uprising ==
"By sunset on March 9 [1959] thousands of men, women, children started to gather outside the walls of the Summer Palace." On March 10, 1959, the crowd surrounded the summer palace in response to fear that the Communist Chinese People's Liberation Army (PLA) were planning to arrest the Dalai Lama at "a theatrical performance at the Chinese military camp at Silling-Bhuk." The people were determined not to allow the Dalai Lama to leave Norbulingka palace. Some members of the crowd directed aggression at Tibetan officials that were thought to be Chinese collaborators. Tenpa Soepa, who was staying at a house on the night of March 10 near Norbulingka said, "When I arrived at the gate I found Kalon Sampho lying on the ground unconscious." Sampho, "...had arrived at Norbulinka [sic] in a car with his Chinese bodyguard. They got out of their car and when the crowd saw the Chinese guard they began throwing stones." "Phakpalha Khenchung ...had been killed by the protestors. He was a government official, and it was rumored that he had a very close relationship with the Chinese." PLA General Tan Kuan-sen considered the Dalai Lama to be in danger and offered him refuge if he could make it to the Chinese camp. He declined the offer. A week into the fighting, the general ordered two mortar rounds shot toward the palace. At that point, the Dalai Lama decided the time had come to slip out over the mountains, with a very small party, arriving a few days later at the Indian border. He was granted asylum by the Nehru government with the stipulation that he would not engage in politics on Indian soil. Meanwhile, Enlai dissolved the Tibetan government and appointed the Preparatory Committee for the Founding of the Tibet Autonomous Region to take its place. In 1959, Tenpa Soepa and other prisoners of war near Toema in Amdo said, "Along the road we could see why our guards were so jumpy. We saw many burnt-out guardposts and even some tanks that were destroyed by Tibetan guerillas. This was Amdo, where the guerrilla war had gone on for years."

Once in exile, the Dalai Lama's discourse changed from cooperative autonomy to independence. He cited the 17-Point Agreement as proof of Tibet's claim to sovereignty, while at the same time he declared it void because the Chinese had violated it and because, he claimed, it had been signed under duress. He also made clear that he was in favor of economic, social and political reforms, but that the Chinese had not acted in good faith. He closed his first press conference in India in April 1959 by subtly establishing the government-in-exile by declaring, "wherever I am accompanied by my Government, the Tibetan people will recognize such as the Government of Tibet." The UN General Assembly responded by passing three resolutions in the first half of the decade calling for "respect for the fundamental human rights of the Tibetan people and for their distinctive cultural and religious life" and recognising the right of the Tibetan people to self-determination. The US responded differently.

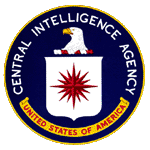
Each year of the 1960s, the CIA provided the Tibetan government-in-exile with $1.7 million for guerrilla operations and $180,000 for cultural centers and international lobbying.

As he was announcing his whereabouts, the Khampa rebels were met by massive Chinese forces and were nearly obliterated. While they spent several months regrouping, the US failed to form a coalition of nations willing to recognize the Tibetan government-in-exile or even to find countries who would host the Dalai Lama on a tour to explain his cause.

== Tibetan resistance, 1958–1973 ==
Already in July 1958, air drops of arms to the Chushi Gangdruk Tibetan resistance movement had begun, the CIA had relocated Tibetan guerrilla trainees to Camp Hale in Colorado, USA (where a Tibetan community still resides today) and parachute dispatch officers had been recruited from among the Montana US Forest Service smoke jumpers (who became known as the "Missoula Mafia"). But according to Thundrop, the Dalai Lama did not know about CIA involvement until he reached India.

In autumn, the CIA parachuted four groups of Camp Hale trainees inside Tibet. The first was met by Chinese and the men fled for their lives. Two groups arrived safely and even facilitated successful arms drops, but the Chinese caught on and within a month all but a few of the team members and thousands of Khampa families were massacred. The CIA guerrilla training failed to take into account that the Khampa warriors travelled with family and livestock in tow. The fourth group had about the same luck. They arrived, received arms drops, were joined by two more teams, but in February 1960 the Chinese killed them along with another 4,000 rebel fighters and their parties. One last group was dropped in 1961, but all but one were killed only three months after landing. The survivor was captured and as he says, tortured, until he told the entire story of Colorado. He was released from prison in 1979.

At the proposal of Thundop and Gompo Tashi in early 1960, a Tibetan guerrilla base was established in Mustang, Nepal, where some 2,000 mostly ethnic Khampa amassed in such a disorderly fashion that the first year was a challenge for survival given that the US could not get food supplies to them due to a suspension of overflights stemming from the U-2 incident. By spring 1961, Mustang guerrilla units had begun raids along a 250-mile stretch inside Tibet. In addition, some 12,000 Tibetans eventually joined the Special Frontier Force that manned the Sino-Indian border. But as the years passed without any bases established inside Tibet, US enthusiasm over the Mustang fighters dwindled and already sparse and insufficient arms drops ceased in 1965, leaving an aging and barely armed guerrilla force in dire straits. The 25 small teams of Colorado-trained Tibetans who were sent into Tibet from 1964 to 1967 on fact-finding missions had no better luck. Only two were able to operate in-country for more than two months, finding no support from compatriots.

Meanwhile, the CIA provided the government-in-exile money to open offices in Geneva and New York, to arrange for resettlement of Tibetan orphans in Switzerland, and to educate a few dozen Tibetans at Cornell University.

By the time Nixon came to the White House, the CIA had already informed Thundrop that they were terminating support. (296) Years later, he would have this to say about the affair:

America didn't want to help Tibet. It just wanted to make trouble for China. It had no far-sighted policy for Tibet[...]The Americans promised to help make Tibet an independent country. All those promises were broken...I can't say the CIA help was useful...it really provoked the Chinese [and] led to reprisals. I feel very sorry for this.

— Gyalo Thondup

According to author and scholar Carole McGranahan of the University of Colorado, today the history of the Tibetan resistance is purposefully down-played, uncelebrated, and even ignored by the Tibetan government in exile as it does not fit well into the global image it wishes to project and the current official position of seeking a peaceful coexistence with China.

== Middle-Way Approach, 1973–present ==
According to the office of the Dalai Lama the essence of the Middle-Way Approach seeks coexistence based on equality and mutual co-operation. It is a:

non-partisan and moderate position that safeguards the vital interests of all concerned parties- for Tibetans: the protection and preservation of their culture, religion and national identity; for the Chinese: the security and territorial integrity of the motherland; and for neighbours and other third parties: peaceful borders and international relations.

The seeds of the Middle-Way Approach were sown in the early 1970s in a series of internal government and external consultations. The Dalai Lama was encouraged in 1979 when Deng Xiaoping told his brother Gyalo Thondup that "except independence, all other issues can be resolved through negotiations". The Dalai Lama agreed to pursue negotiations for a mutually beneficial and peaceful resolution rather than fighting to restore independence. He sent three fact finding missions into Tibet and wrote Deng Xiaoping a long personal letter before his representatives traveled to Beijing in 1982 to open negotiations. However, they reported that their Chinese counterparts were not interested in discussing the situation in Tibet, only the personal status and future of the 14th Dalai Lama. Nevertheless, during the 1980s, the Dalai Lama would send 6 delegations to China. In 1987, before the U.S. Congressional Human Rights Caucus the Dalai Lama unveiled the Five Point Peace Plan as a "first step towards a lasting solution".

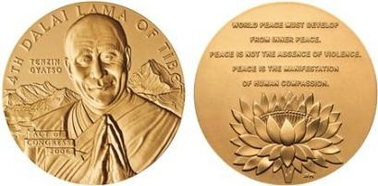
Congressional Gold Medal awarded to "Tenzin Gyatso the 14th Dalai Lama of Tibet". The back side quotes him, "World Peace Must Develop From Inner Peace. Peace Is Not The Absence Of Violence. Peace Is The Manifestation Of Human Compassion."

1. Transformation of the whole of Tibet into a zone of peace;
2. Abandonment of China's population transfer policy which threatens the very existence of the Tibetans as a people;
3. Respect for the Tibetan people's fundamental human rights and democratic freedoms;
4. Restoration and protection of Tibet's natural environment and the abandonment of China's use of Tibet for the production of nuclear weapons and dumping of nuclear waste;
5. Commencement of earnest negotiations on the future status of Tibet and of relations between the Tibetan and Chinese peoples.

The next year, the Dalai Lama addressed the European Parliament and offered what was later called the Strasbourg Proposal 1988, which elaborated on the Middle-Way Approach and a vision of reconciliation, resembling what some historians say was a suzerainty relationship between China and Tibet. The proposal basically calls for the establishment of a democratic Tibet with complete sovereignty over its domestic affairs and non-political foreign affairs, with China retaining its responsibility for Tibet's foreign policy and maintaining its military presence temporarily. The Middle-Way policy was adopted unanimously by the 4th session of the 12th Assembly of Tibetan People's Deputies on September 18, 1997.

The periodic meetings between the Central Tibetan Administration's envoys and the Chinese government were, Tundrop felt, "like one hand clapping" and so the CTA suspended them in 1994. They resumed at the pace of one per year between 2002 and 2008. In 2008, at the 8th round of talks, CTA envoys presented a document called Memorandum on Genuine Autonomy for the Tibetan People and a Note in response to Chinese government's statement asking what degree of autonomy is being sought by Tibetans. The Memorandum states that "in order for the Tibetan nationality to develop and flourish with its distinct identity, culture and spiritual tradition through the exercise of self-government on the above mentioned 11 basic Tibetan needs, the entire community, comprising all the areas currently designated by the PRC as Tibetan autonomous areas, should be under a single administrative entity. It further mentions that "bringing all the Tibetans currently living in designated Tibetan autonomous areas within a single autonomous administrative unit is entirely in accordance with the constitutional (Chinese) principle contained in Article 4, also reflected in the Law on Regional National Autonomy LRNA (Article 2), that "regional autonomy is practiced in areas where people of minority nationalities live in concentrated communities."

According to Central Tibetan Administration, the Middle-Way Approach enjoys widespread support from the international community. In 2008, a group of 29 Chinese dissidents urged Beijing to open direct dialogue with Tibet's exiled spiritual leader, the Dalai Lama. In June 2012, the European parliament in Strasbourg passed a resolution commending the new CTA leadership for its commitment to resolve the issue of Tibet through Middle-Way Approach. US President Barack Obama after meeting with Dalai lama on 21 February 2014, issued a statement applauding the Dalai Lama's commitment to non-violence and dialogue with China and his pursuit of Middle-Way Approach.

On 5 June 2014, Central Tibetan Administration launched an international awareness campaign on the Middle-Way Approach. According to CTA, the campaign was to counter Chinese government's deliberate attempts to spread misinformation on the Middle-Way Approach. During the campaign, CTA created a series of documents, websites, documentary films and social media handles.

More recently in 2018, a delegation of the European Parliament expressed support for the Middle-Way Approach. In 2019, a Senator of the Canadian Parliament and the U.S. Department of State's Report on International Religious Freedom issued calls of support for the Middle-Way Approach as a sustainable solution for resolving the ongoing religious and human rights violations in Tibet.

=== Criticisms ===
The Middle-Way Approach was criticized in 2014 by American historian Elliot Sperling as a part of a "self-delusion" based on a hope that the approach was for and would gain independence.

== Uprisings and protests, 1987–1989 ==
A series of pro-independence protests that took place between September 1987 and March 1989 in the Tibetan areas in the People's Republic of China: Sichuan, Tibet Autonomous Region and Qinghai, and the Tibetan prefectures in Yunnan and Gansu. The largest demonstrations began on March 5, 1989, in the Tibetan capital of Lhasa, when a group of monks, nuns, and laypeople took to the streets as the 30th anniversary of the 1959 Tibetan uprising approached. Police and security officers attempted to put down the protests, but as tensions escalated an even greater crowd of protesters amassed. After three days of violence, martial law was declared on March 8, 1989, and foreign journalists and tourists were expelled from Tibet on March 10. Reports of deaths and military force being used against protesters were prominent. Numbers of the dead are unknown.

== 2008 protests and uprisings ==
Sporadic and isolated outbursts by Tibetans against the Chinese continued especially during the unrest between September 1987 until March 1989 in the Tibetan areas of the PRC. But it wasn't until 2008 that a large-scale and coordinated uprising erupted coinciding with international protests accompanying the Olympics torch relay that would end in Beijing where the 2008 Summer Olympics were held.

During the annual observance of both the 1959 Tibetan Uprising Day and the escape of the 14th Dalai Lama to India, monks from two different monasteries began marches into Lhasa on 10 March. Peaceful street protests and demonstrations grew, and were met by excessive force from Chinese police and military units on 14 March. Crowd control, shootings, beatings and arrests escalated the tensions, eventually setting off clashes between thousands of Tibetans in the Ramoche section of Lhasa and Chinese security forces. The clashes spread to include arson. Reports indicate more than 1200 Chinese shops, offices, and residences were burned, and fire was set to nearly 100 cars, including police vehicles. Monks were arrested at monasteries, and the number of Tibetans killed varies between 140 and 219 deaths. Other Tibetans were arrested, and Amnesty International reports 1000 Tibetans remained "unaccounted for" by June. The paramilitary People's Armed Police were sent in and 50–100 Tibetans were killed. The international community condemned the suppression of the protests, which spread through the Tibetan plateau. Other reports on the clashes estimate among Han settlers, 22 were dead and 325 injured. Damage was estimated at $40 million USD. In the Gansu Province, another demonstration by 400 monks was met with Chinese security forces, igniting a clash by more than 5000 Tibetans who again burned down the establishments of local Han and Hui settlers before the forces arrived.

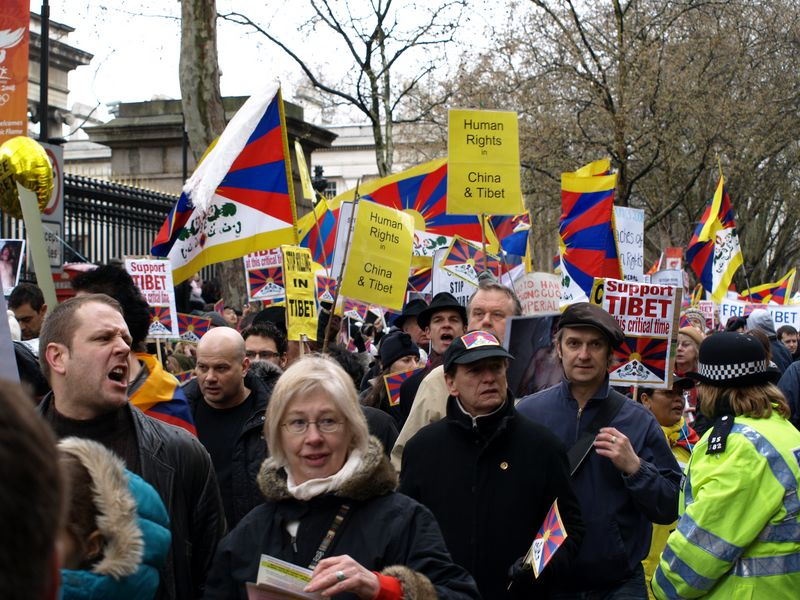
Pro-Tibetan protesters at Olympic Torch Relay London 2008

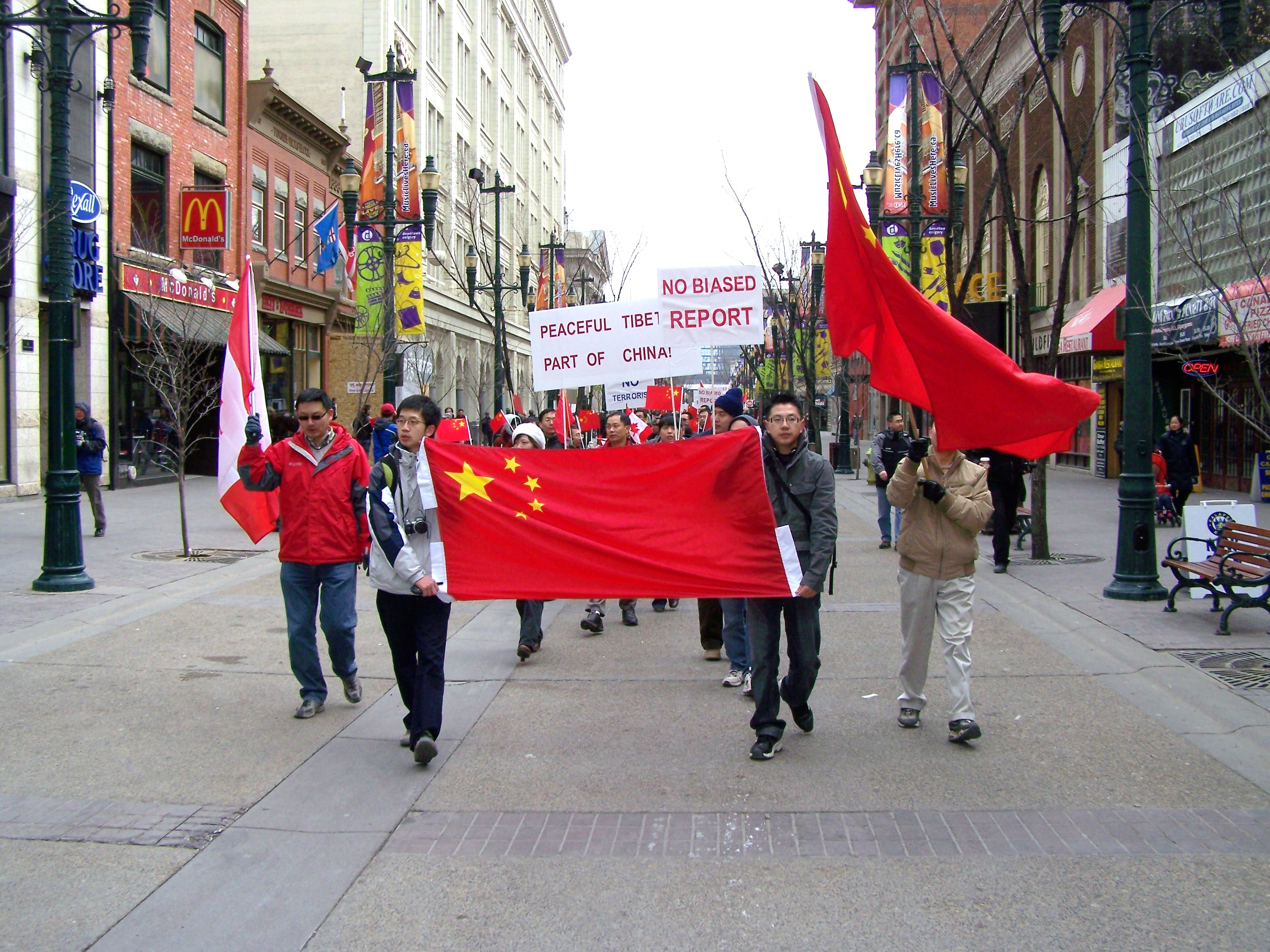
Pro-Chinese demonstration at Olympic Torch Relay in Calgary 2008

The Tibetan chairman of the TAR government Jampa Phuntsok, who was in Beijing at the time, told the foreign press that security personnel in Lhasa had shown great restraint and did not use lethal force. However, it was the chairman of the Chinese Communist Party who was dispatched to Tibet to deal with the situation and the Tibetan officials remained in other provinces. Eventually 90 locations erupted in protests. Their common slogans and Tibetan flags indicated desires for independence or autonomy. China’s stranglehold on Tibet and its brutal suppression of separatist activity has continued in the decades following the unsuccessful uprising.

Simultaneously, in India a coalition of Tibetan exile organizations- Tibetan Youth Congress (YTC), Tibetan Women's Association, Tibetan political prisoners' movement, Students for a Free Tibet and National Democratic Party of Tibet- calling itself the Tibetan People's Uprising Movement (TPUM) struck out on a "Return March to Tibet" on March 10. Carrying Tibetan flags and calling for independence, they planned to reach Tibet on foot just in time for the opening of the Olympic Games. Both India and Nepal reminded the Dalai Lama that the Tibetans' welcome in the area was predicated on the agreement of no anti-China political maneuvers from their territories. The Dharamsala government met with the marchers. When it was clear that the marchers would continue their trek, they were arrested by state authorities in the northern Indian state of Uttarakhand on March 28.

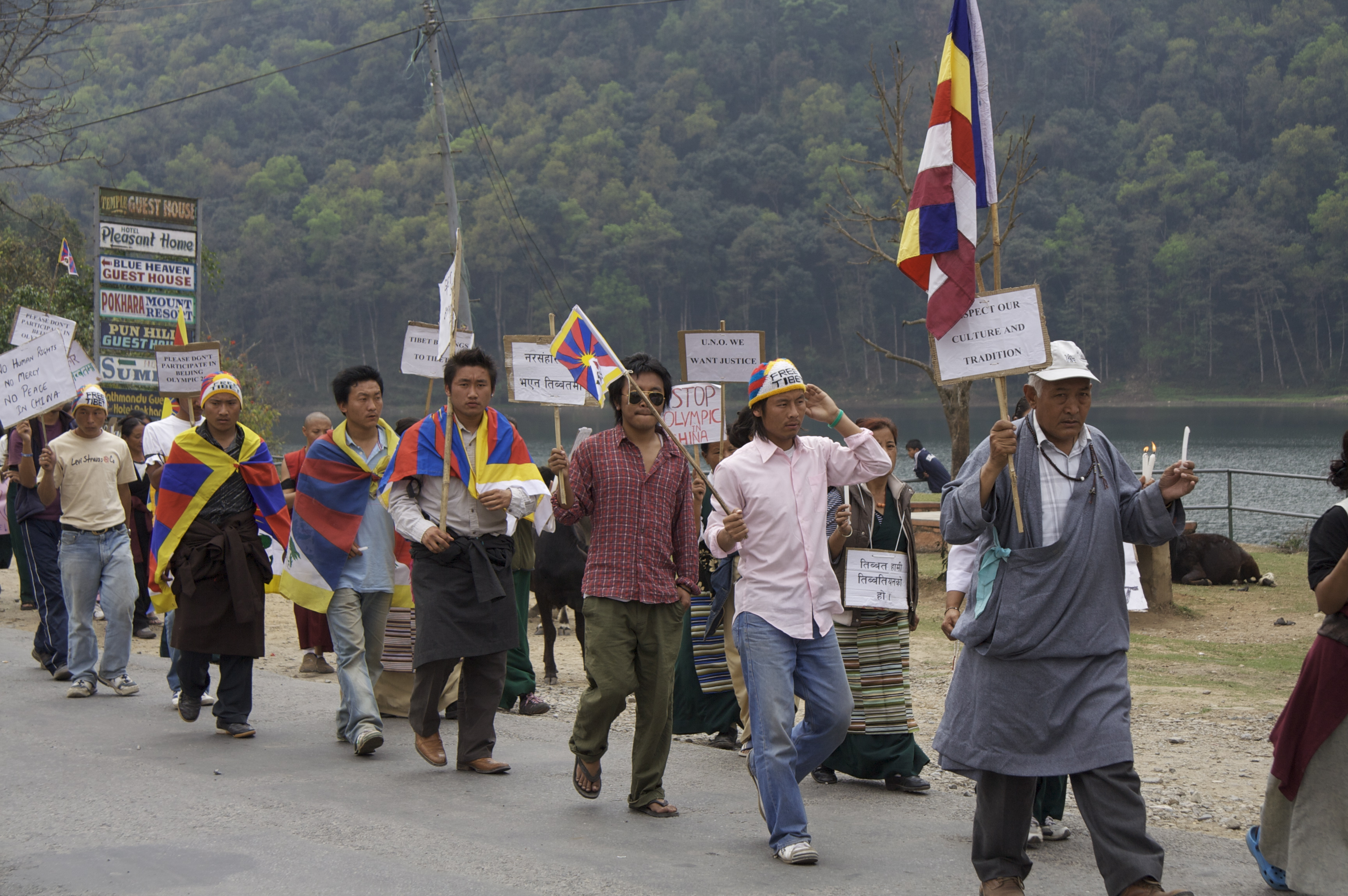
Tibetans protest in Pokhara, Nepal, 2008

On March 24, 2008 the Olympic Torch Relay began its 137,000 km route. Tibetan exiles and supporters in Paris, London, San Francisco, New Delhi, Islamabad, and Jakarta, Seoul, etc. used the event to stage protests. In some places they were met by local Chinese and other counter-protesters. The fiasco caused the International Olympic Committee to ban international Torch Relay in the future. The Chinese government blamed the "Dalai clique" for the uprising, the march and the Olympic protests and called TYC a terrorist organization prepared to initiate guerrilla warfare once across the border. The PRC published articles denouncing the various historical plots and activities of the Tibetan exiles as well as US funding to Tibetan activists through the National Endowment for Democracy.

The Dalai Lama denied that his government had anything to do with the Olympic protests and said that he did not advocate a boycott of the games. He called on demonstrators to refrain from any violence, and gave interviews clarifying that his goals were not currently to seek independence from China. The Dalai Lama threatened to resign over TPUM disobedience to the official policy of non-violence and genuine Tibetan autonomy. In the end, international pressure finally led PRC representatives to renew unofficial talks with their Dharamsala counterparts.

== Self-immolations ==
As of July 2020, 156 monks, nuns, and ordinary people have self-immolated in Tibet since 27 February 2009 when Tapey, a young monk from Kirti Monastery set himself on fire in the marketplace in Ngawa City, Ngawa County, Sichuan. Some of the protesters who set themselves on fire were teenagers. Most such incidents have taken place in Sichuan province, especially around the Kirti Monastery in Ngawa City, others in Gansu and Qinghai provinces and Tibet Autonomous Region. Self-immolation protests by Tibetans also occurred in India and Kathmandu, Nepal. In 2011 a wave of self-immolations by Tibetans in China, India and Nepal occurred after the Phuntsog self-immolation incident of March 16, 2011 in Ngawa County, Sichuan. The Dalai Lama has said he does not encourage the protests, but he has praised the courage of those who engage in self-immolation and blamed the self-immolations on "cultural genocide" by the Chinese. Premier Wen Jiabao said that such extreme actions hurt social harmony and that Tibet and the Tibetan areas of Sichuan are integral parts of Chinese territory. According to The Economist, the self-immolations have caused the government's attitude to harden.

Self-immolations by Tibetans protesting Chinese domination of Tibet have had a greater impact than earlier protests; despite considerable loss of life during the Tibetan protests in 2008 on the part of both the Tibetan and Han population in Tibet, casualties were simply not reported by the Chinese government. Self-immolations, on the other hand, result in dramatic images of the protester while burning or afterwards which can be easily transmitted over the internet to news media and supporters. Internet access has reached even remote areas in the parts of China where Tibetans live.

In August 2026, hundreds of Tibetans, mostly Tibetan youth, from the United States and Canada gathered outside the United Nations in New York to remember Lobga Rangzen who died after setting himself on fire and to protest against Chinese rule in Tibet.

== Suicide protests ==
There have been reports of several Tibetans who took their lives in other ways in addition to self immolating.

On 17 October 2011, Tenzin Wangmo, a 20-year-old Tibetan Buddhist nun from Ngaba, Sichuan, self-immolated in protest calling for the return of the Dalai Lama to Tibet and greater freedom for Tibetans. Her act was part of a larger wave of protests driven by Tibetan resistance to China's political and cultural repression in the region. She died at the scene, and authorities reportedly cremated her body the same day to prevent it becoming a symbol of resistance. When local residents gathered to pray and fast in her memory, security forces dispersed them.

On April 2, 2012, a 26-year-old student named Dhondup Phuntsok drowned himself in Kolkata, India. He left a note calling for a free Tibet. Later that year in December, five Tibetans who attempted to self-immolate had also drowned themselves.

On January 19, 2013, a 17-year-old Tibetan named Jigjey Kyab had attempted to set himself on fire also but had consumed fox poison.

Another such protest is Tibetans stabbing themselves. In 2014, a 32-year-old father named Phakpa Gyaltsen had stabbed himself and jumped to his death calling for freedom in Tibet, Independence, and an end to the mines Chinese authorities built in Tibet. 2 years later, a young man named Rigzin Dorjee had attempted to stab himself to death in front of the Chinese embassy in the Netherlands. He had survived. A year later in 2017, an unidentified Tibetan had slit his own throat in a protest against the Chinese government.

Several Tibetans had also hanged themselves against religious persecution. In 2014, a monk named Thabke hanged himself in Sangchu. He was based in Labrang Monastery and hanged himself to protest the restrictions placed on monks and nuns. Another nun named Tsering Dolma had hanged herself 2 years later to protest the planned destruction of Larung Gar Buddhist Institute.

On September 7, 2017, a Tibetan man named Tashi Namgyal had allowed himself to be run over by a railway track in Emmebrücke heading to Olten in Switzerland. He left two notes calling for the freedom in Tibet and another calling for the Swiss government to allow asylum for 300 Tibetan refugees.

== Tibetan-Muslim sectarian violence ==
In Tibet, the majority of Muslims are Hui people. Tension between Tibetans and Muslims stems from events during the Muslim warlord Ma Bufang's rule in Qinghai such as Ngolok rebellions (1917–1949) and the Sino-Tibetan War. In the past riots have broken out between Muslims and Tibetans. The repression of Tibetan separatism by the Chinese government is supported by Hui Muslims. In addition, Chinese-speaking Hui have problems with Tibetan Hui (the Tibetan speaking Kache minority of Muslims).

The front gate of the main mosque in Lhasa was burned down by Tibetan rioters attempting to storm the building while Chinese Hui Muslim shops and restaurants were destroyed in the 2008 Tibetan unrest. Sectarian violence between Tibetan Buddhists and Muslims does not get widespread attention in the media.

== Dalai Lama's resignation as political leader ==
The 14th Dalai Lama, Tenzin Gyatso, officially announced retirement from his role as the political leader of the Central Tibetan Administration in March 2011 just before elections were to take place to choose the next prime minister, which would become the highest ranking political office of the CTA. He had talked about doing so at least since 2008. In a press conference in December 2010, the Dalai Lama stated that the "400 year-old tradition" of the Dalai Lama serving as spiritual and political leader had already been terminated in 2001, after which the CTA's elected political leadership had been carrying out the administrative responsibilities. The Dalai Lama jokingly added that therefore, he had been in semi-retirement for a decade.

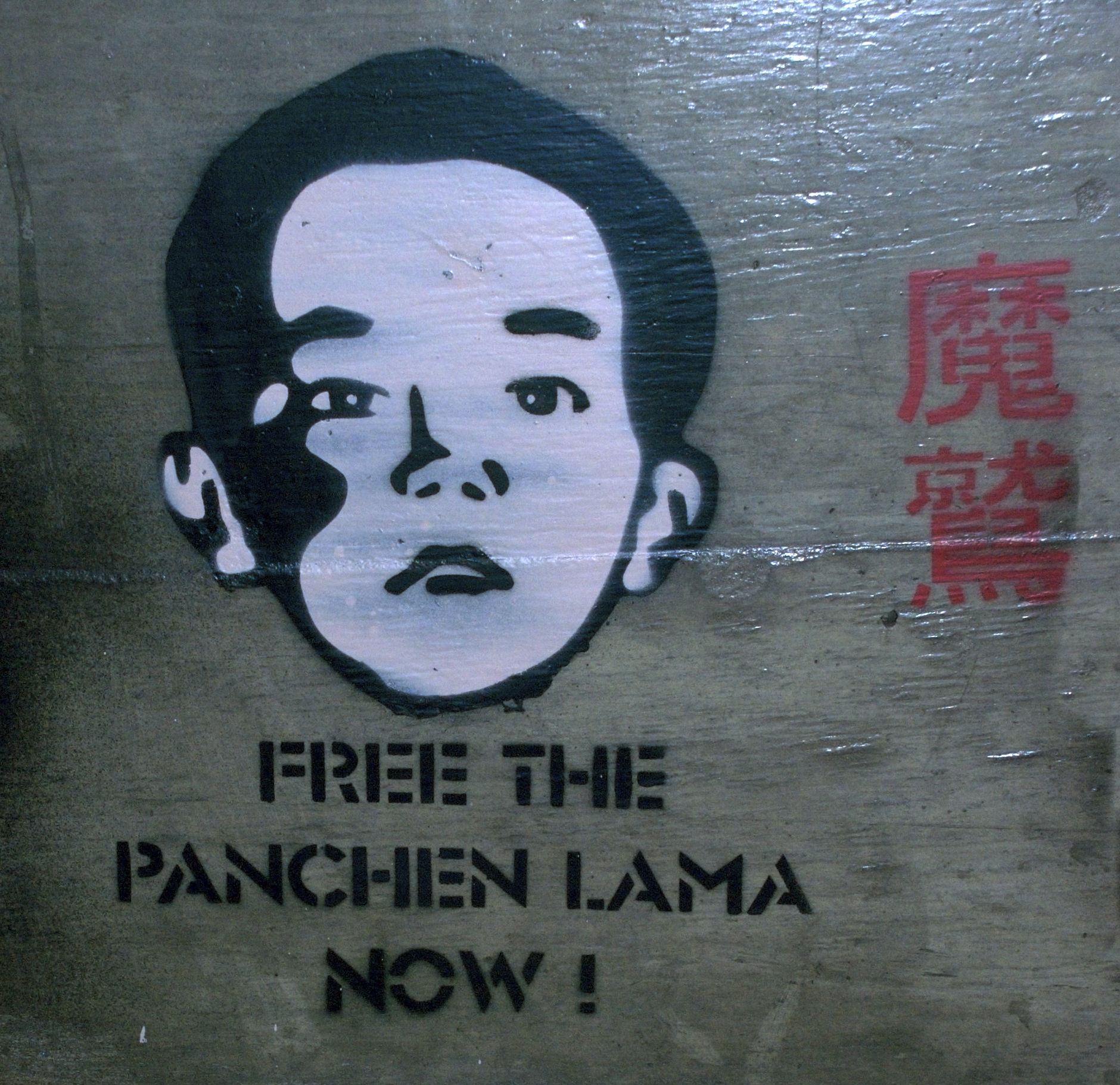
11th Panchen Lama, Gedhun Choekyi Nyima, forcibly disappeared on 17 May 1995, three days after being recognized on 14 May by the 14th Dalai Lama

The Chinese government called the retirement a "political show" and said that the CTA is illegal and any moves will not be recognized. Kate Saunders of the International Campaign for Tibet speculated that governments who have found it politically troublesome for them to deal with the Dalai Lama as a political-religious leader may now be able to forge a formal relationship with him as a purely religious leader.

Dr. Lobsang Sangay, a Fulbright scholar and graduate of Harvard Law School who was born in a refugee camp in India in 1968 and who has never visited Tibet, was named Prime Minister of the CTA on April 27, 2011. He announced that he would spend his first five-year tenure in Dharamsala, India, the seat of the CTA. There he will not only assume the administrative responsibilities held by the previous PM, but will succeed the Dalai Lama as the political leader of the Tibetan cause, thus ignoring the PRC insistence that the Dalai Lama be succeeded by means of reincarnation, not another method of selection. Sangay, who once was a militant of the Tibetan Youth Congress, a group that unequivocally supports Tibetan independence, says he has matured and now supports the Middle Way Approach. Only about 80,000 Tibetans, half of the registered exile population, were eligible to vote because those living in Nepal were prevented by their host country from participating. The 6 million Tibetans inside Tibet and China did not participate. It is unknown if an exile government not led by the Dalai Lama, who was legitimated by religious tradition, will be viable.

Meanwhile, the Dalai Lama continues resisting Chinese domination over Tibetan culture and religion by describing China's policies as "some kind of policy, some kind of cultural genocide is taking place". China is also attempting to ensure that after leaving this lifetime, the Dalai Lama's Avalokiteshvara reincarnates meet China's approval: China has declared that the next Dalai Lama must be born in China, thereby excluding anyone born outside their political control. The Dalai Lama has refused to be reborn in China and has suggested that perhaps the bodhisattva of compassion will simply choose not to return to earth after this lifetime.

Since tradition dictates that only the Dalai Lamas can recognize the incarnations of the Panchen Lamas, who in turn can recognize the incarnations of Avalokiteshvara, the recognition of both the Dalai Lama and Panchen Lama incarnates are China's political objective. In the 11th Panchen Lama controversy, the Dalai Lama recognized Gedhun Choekyi Nyima in 1995, who was then forcibly disappeared from public three days later, along with his family, when he was 6 years old. The Chinese government says that he is under state protection, but has refused all requests from human rights organizations, including the UN Human Rights Council, to supply any proof of this. The Chinese government subsequently named their own Panchen Lama Gyaincain Norbu, installed at Tashilhunpo Monastery, who was recently appointed to the Chinese People's Political Consultative Conference.

== See also ==
- Annexation of Tibet by the People's Republic of China
- Antireligious campaigns of the Chinese Communist Party
- Censorship in China
- History of Tibet (1950–present)
- Human rights in China
- Racism in China
- Sinicization of Tibet
- Tibetan independence movement
- Tibetan sovereignty debate
- Chushi Gangdruk
- 1987–1989 Tibetan unrest
- 2008 Tibetan unrest
- Self-immolation protests by Tibetans in China
- Kirti Monastery's recent events
- Special Frontier Force
- East Turkestan independence movement
