= 1987–1989 Tibetan unrest =

Series of pro-independence protests and demonstrations in Tibet, China

The 1987–1989 Tibetan uprising was a series of protests and demonstrations that called for Tibetan independence. These protests took place between September 1987 and March 1989 in the Tibet Autonomous Region, in the Tibetan regions of Sichuan, and Qinghai, as well as the Tibetan prefectures in Yunnan and Gansu. Protests began shortly after the Dalai Lama, the religious and temporal leader of Tibet exiled in India since the 1959 Tibetan unrest, proposed a Five Point Peace Plan regarding the "status of Tibet" on September 21, 1987, which was subsequently rejected by the Chinese government. The plan advocated for greater respect and autonomy of the Tibetan people, and claimed that "Tibet was a fully independent state when the People's Liberation Army invaded the country in 1949–50." China rejected the idea of Tibetans as an invaded people, stating that "Tibet is an inalienable part of Chinese territory" and has been for hundreds of years. The Tibetan sovereignty debate is longstanding, and the Tibetan assertion that they are a separate and unique people invaded by China has become a central argument for their independence.

On September 27, 1987, the first demonstration began. Twenty-one monks from Lhasa's Drepung Monastery and an undetermined number of laypeople took to the streets to show their support for the Dalai Lama, waving the Tibetan flag and calling for Tibetan independence; the Chinese authorities arrested all twenty-one monks as well as five laypeople. On October 1, China's National Day, monks from Lhasa's Sera Monastery decided to protest once again, calling for Tibetan independence, but this protest turned violent. Protesters threw rocks at the police, overturned motor vehicles and set them on fire, the police station was set ablaze, and at least six Tibetans died. Chinese media classified those involved as rioters, agitators, and members of a "clique of supporters of the Dalai Lama." In the following weeks, the Chinese authorities arrested hundreds of Tibetans suspected of being at the demonstrations, told foreign travellers and journalists to leave, and established a curfew. Over the next three years, demonstrations of various sizes continued to occur.

The largest demonstrations took place between March 5–7, 1989 in the Tibetan capital of Lhasa. It began as a small protest on March 5, with a handful of nuns, monks, and Tibetan youth in the Barkhor flying the Tibetan flag and calling for Tibetan independence, but they were quickly joined by a crowd of several hundred people. As time went on, tensions escalated between protesters and the police, and violence eventually erupted. According to Tibet Watch, violence erupted when a policeman threw a bottle at the crowd, but Chinese media reported that the violence began with protesters throwing rocks at the police station. Either way, the violence between Tibetan protesters and Chinese security forces continued for three days, with PAP soldiers shooting at unarmed civilian protesters in order to restore order. Protests ended with the declaration of martial law on March 8. The few foreign journalists and tourists remaining were expelled from Tibet on March 10 and an estimated 60,000 Chinese troops and police arrived in Lhasa to restore order. Accounts of underreported deaths and excessive military threat against protesters have surfaced, but verifiable details remain elusive. The exact number of deaths during this three-day period is unknown, with Chinese news outlets recording a total of 10 deaths and 60 injured while other, non-Chinese or pro-Tibet, media estimate between 16 and 50 people died. Another report estimates as many as 450 deaths and hundreds more injured in the first few months of 1989 in Tibet. Martial law effectively quelled the demonstrations, with Chinese police arresting thousands of Tibetans suspected of participating in the demonstrations and reportedly silencing any media trying to report on the unrest. Lhasa would remain under martial law for thirteen months, but no more large protests would occur.

== Timeline ==
=== 1987 ===
September 21 – the Dalai Lama reveals his Five-Point Peace Plan for Tibet in an address to the U.S. Congressional Human Rights Caucus in Washington, D.C.

September 23 – China rejects the Dalai Lama's Five-Point Peace Plan.

September 27 – twenty-one monks from the Drepung Monastery took to the streets of Lhasa to show support for the Dalai Lama, waving the Tibetan flag and calling for Tibetan Independence. They were gradually joined by a number of laypeople. The Chinese authorities broke up the demonstration, arresting all twenty-one monks and five laypeople. Multiple news reports labeled this the "black night."

October 1 – large demonstrations occurred on China's National Day in Lhasa when monks from the Sera Monastery decided to fly Tibetan flags and call for Tibetan independence once more. These demonstrations turned violent, with demonstrators overturning vehicles, setting vehicles and the police station ablaze, and throwing stones at the police. At least six Tibetans died.

October 4 – the Chinese authorities impose a 10 pm curfew on Lhasa residents.

October 6 – a group of roughly fifty monks from the Drepung Monastery began protesting for the release of the monks detained during the September 27 demonstrations while also calling once more for Tibetan independence. An overwhelming force of 250 armed police broke up the peaceful demonstrations, reportedly beating the protesters with a variety of weapons, and arresting the monks. The monks were released soon after.

October 8 – Chinese authorities told foreign journalists to leave Tibet within 48 hours or "face the consequences."

=== 1988 ===
March 5 – a revolt took place at the celebration of the Great Prayer (Monlam Prayer Festival). The riots cost the lives of three persons according to Chinese sources; thirty according to the Tibetan opposition.

June – the Dalai Lama, Tenzin Gyatso, altered his demands to the Chinese government. In his speech at the European Parliament on June 15, 1988, the Dalai Lama proposed a solution for Tibet "in association with the People's Republic of China."

December 10 – further riots in Lhasa. According to official sources one person died; unofficial sources spoke of twelve. Dutch lawyer Christa Meindersma is amongst those shot by Chinese soldiers.

=== 1989 ===
January 19 – sentences were pronounced in consequence of the arrests made during the riots of 1988 with deterrent harshness. The sentences ranged from three years imprisonment to the death penalty (with delay of March 7 – all foreigners including journalists were evacuated. This signified an end to the provision of information to the rest of the world on the riots. Five people died in two days according to official sources. However, Tang Daxian, a former Chinese journalist present in Lhasa during that period, claims 387 civilians plus 82 religious people have been killed, and 721 people have been injured, according to a report he saw from Public Security Bureau.

== See also ==
- Annexation of Tibet by the People's Republic of China
- History of Tibet (1950–present)
- Human rights in Tibet
- Protests and uprisings in Tibet since 1950
  - 1959 Tibetan uprising
  - 2008 Tibetan unrest
  - 2010 Tibetan language protest
- Sinicization of Tibet
- Tibetan independence movement
- Tibetan sovereignty debate
