= Georg Blume =

German journalist (born 1963)

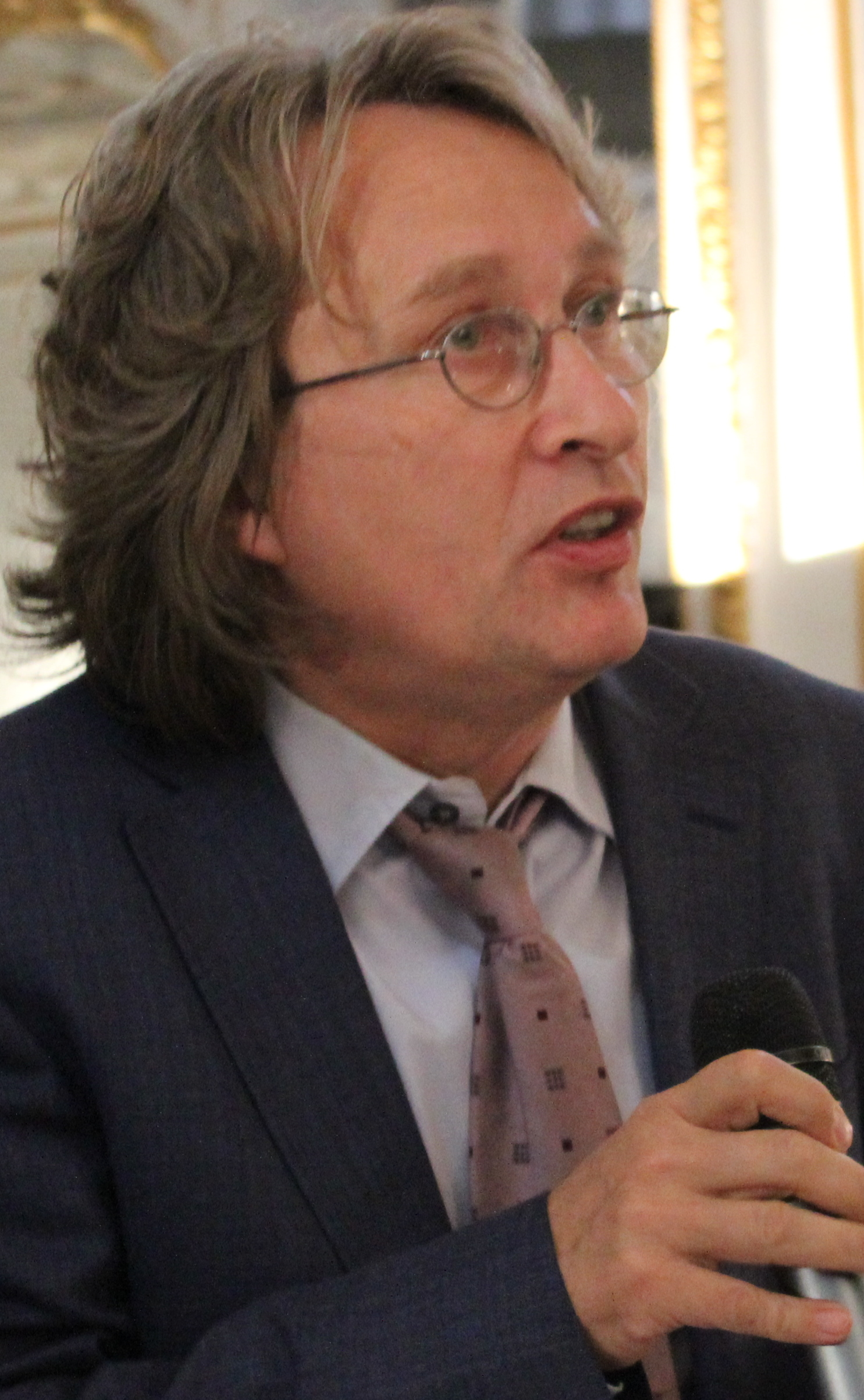
Georg Blume in 2015

Georg Blume (born 1963 in Hanover) is a German journalist and has been a correspondent in Beijing (China) for the German newspapers Die Zeit and taz since 1997. He has reported repeatedly on human rights issues and environmental scandals in China. Before being posted in China he has reported from Japan and France. He was one of the last independent reporters from Lhasa during the 2008 unrest in Tibet before being de facto expelled from the region.

== Publications ==
- “China is not an evil empire: Berlin und Beijing should cooperate despite Tibet”
