= Kate Saunders (Tibet specialist) =

English author, journalist and specialist of Tibet and China

Kate Saunders (born 1964) is an English author, journalist and specialist of Tibet and China. Her articles have been published in newspapers and magazines worldwide including The Times, The Sunday Times, The Washington Post, and The Independent. She has a column in The Sunday Guardian.

== Biography ==
In the early 1990s, Kate Saunders traveled to India to work on a tiger sanctuary, and during this trip, she met Tibetan monks whose story decided her to act on Tibet issue upon her return in England.

She is a founder of the Laogai Research Group, UK and worked for the release of Harry Wu a Chinese prison in the late 1990.

She became an analyst, writer and spokesperson for Tibet Information Network. She was the director of communication of International Campaign for Tibet (ITC) and is currently the Director of Research at the ICT Washington, DC office.

She has been a contributor to radio, with interview appearing on Radio Australia, BBC World Service and other BBC programs.

In 2006, after the Nangpa La shooting incident, although difficult to get people to talk to journalists, she convinced direct witnesses, Steve Lawes and Luis Benitez, who accepted to meet Tibetan refugees, which led him to talk to media.

One of her conference scheduled on Tibet crisis at Foreign Correspondents' Club, Hong Kong in 2009 was postponed after request by the China's Foreign Ministry stating to be « firmly opposed Tibetan separatists to come to Hong Kong for any separatist activities ».

At two Tibet lawsuits in Spain, she was a witness, and gave expert evidence in Spain’s National Court in Madrid, in April 2009 and in December 2012.
