= 2008 Tibetan unrest =

Political violence and inter-ethnic tensions in Tibet

- Part of protest and dissent in China
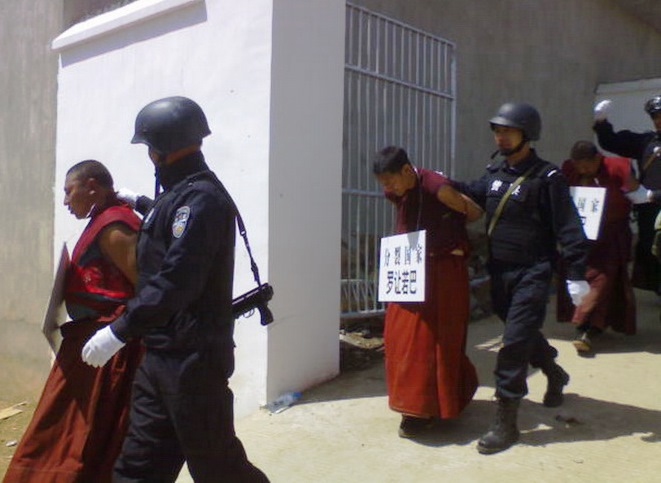
- Tibetan monks in Chinese custody, April 2008
- Location: Lhasa, Tibet
- Caused by: Alleged mistreatment of Tibetans by the Chinese Communist Party

Parties
Chinese Communist Party; People's Liberation Army; People's Armed Police; Han and Hui communities	Tibetan demonstrators Central Tibetan Administration (alleged; denied)

Casualties
- Deaths: 23 (per government); 203-400 (per CTA and Dalai Lama)

The 2008 Tibetan unrest, also referred to as the 2008 Tibetan uprising in Tibetan media, was a series of protests and demonstrations that initially occurred over the Chinese Communist Party's treatment and persecution of Tibetans. Protests in Lhasa, the capital of Tibet, by monks and nuns on 10 March have been viewed as the start of the demonstrations. Numerous protests and demonstrations were held to commemorate the 49th anniversary of the 1959 Tibetan Uprising Day, when the 14th Dalai Lama escaped from Tibet. The protests and demonstrations spread spontaneously to a number of monasteries and throughout the Tibetan plateau, including into counties located outside the Tibet Autonomous Region.

The arrest of monks at Labrang Monastery escalated tensions, leading to ethnically-charged violence against non-ethnic Tibetans and their perceived sympathizers. The resulting clashes between ethnic Tibetans and Han and Hui Chinese resulting in a number of Han and Hui stores and buildings being destroyed and numerous Chinese civilians being injured, killed, or displaced.

The use of force by Chinese police and military forces during the unrest has been controversial, with some, including Human Rights Watch and Amnesty International, deeming it excessive force. The International Campaign for Tibet estimates a total of 235 protests occurred from 10 March until the end of October 2009. The Chinese government's Xinhua News Agency estimated that 150 protests occurred between 10 March and 25 March. The Chinese government reported that 23 people were killed during the riots themselves, while the Central Tibetan Administration claimed 203 were killed in the aftermath alone, and the Dalai Lama alleged 400 Tibetans were killed in total. Foreign journalists were expelled or forced to leave during the uprising anniversary. Amnesty International reported 1,000 Tibetan protestors remained "unaccounted for" by June 2008, while the Central Tibetan Administration reported 5,600 arrests of Tibetans between March 2008 and January 2009, with 1,294 injuries within the same period.

Protests supporting Tibetans were held in cities in North America and Europe, as well as in Beijing, Australia, India, and Nepal. Many of the international protests also called for a boycott of the Beijing Olympics. On 24 March, the torch lighting ceremony in Greece was disrupted by activists, including some from Reporters Without Borders. At Chinese embassies, protests ranged from pelting the embassies with eggs and rocks to protestors entering the premises and raising Tibetan flags, which was outlawed in Tibet by the Chinese government in 1959.

Protesters in Tibet that were arrested and detained claimed they were tortured and told to admit they were paid to protest by the 14th Dalai Lama. The Chinese government stated the unrest was motivated by separatism and blamed the Dalai Lama for orchestrating it. The Dalai Lama denied the accusation and said that the situation was caused by "deep seated disillusionment and despair" in Tibet, and invited Chinese officials to come to India with its evidence. Representatives of the Chinese government and the Dalai Lama held talks on China's Tibet policies on 4 May and 1 July of the same year.

== Background ==
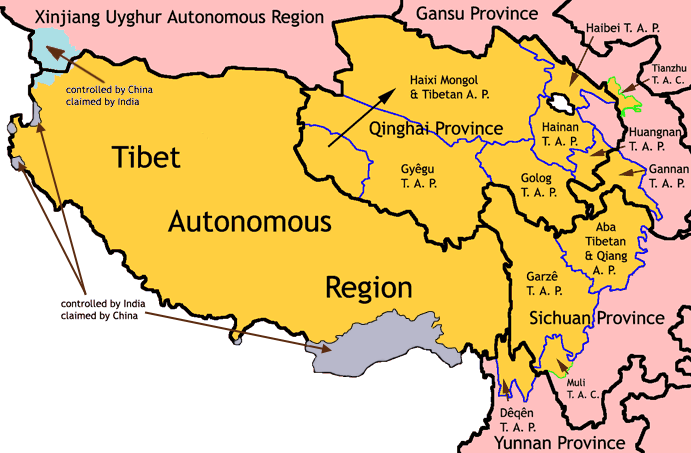
Orange refers to Tibet's original land boundaries, subdivided into provinces by China and designated as Tibetan (and other ethnic minorities) autonomous areas.

The protests erupted amidst growing frustrations with China's persecution of Tibetans and of Tibetan Buddhists, which Tibetans assert began after China's annexation in 1951. Unresolved situations remained regarding Tibet's three highest spiritual leaders - the 14th Dalai Lama and the 17th Gyalwang Karmapa both escaped to India, while the 11th Panchen Lama's location remains unknown. Photographs of the Dalai Lama remain outlawed, as are Tibetan flags. Efforts at brokering agreements on behalf of Tibetans by the Dalai Lama with China had stalled. The protests and uprisings in Tibet since 1950 include earlier mass protests in Lhasa—the 1959 Tibetan uprising, and the 1987 protests which were likewise led by monks from Sera monastery, Drepung monastery and Ganden monastery.

Of the 1989 bloody suppression in Lhasa, journalist Jim Yardley wrote:

"In the past China has not hesitated to crush major protests in Tibet or to jail disobedient monks. [Former] President Hu Jintao, who [was] also the general secretary of the Communist Party, served as party boss in Tibet during a violent crackdown in 1989. His support for the bloody suppression of unrest that year earned him the good will of Deng Xiaoping, then the paramount leader, and led directly to his elevation to the Politburo Standing Committee and eventually to China’s top leadership posts."

The Dalai Lama and the Central Tibetan Administration (CTA) proposed the Middle Way Approach to address the government of China's policies in Tibet. Specific agreements offered to China include the Five Point Peace Plan in 1987, the Strasbourg proposal in 1988, and the Memorandum on Genuine Autonomy in 2008. Tibetan loyalty to the Dalai Lama is considered disloyalty to the Chinese Communist Party (CCP), and is viewed by the Chinese government as a crime of separatism and a threat to China's national security and expansionism. Kelsang Dolma wrote, "when the 2008 Tibet protests erupted, fomented by discontent with decades-long repression, the CCP ruthlessly responded by killing and arbitrarily arresting protesters".

As a policy begun by Chairman Mao in 1950, Beijing promotes settlements of Han Chinese within Tibet, which dilute Tibetan culture and identity, as the Dalai Lama and others have stated. The CTA also states, "[u]nder the guise of the economic and social development, Beijing encourages its population to migrate to Tibet with the clear aim to marginalize Tibetans from the economic, educational, political and social life of the region." A railway link opened in 2006 delivers three thousand Han a day to the region. Within Lhasa, Tsering Woeser reports that Tibetans are discriminated against at spiritual sites, and residents were relocated to rural areas, as urban areas were redeveloped for Han residents and businesses. Nomadic Tibetans are forced to build homes and borrow money for construction costs, while their grazing lands are redistributed, as reported by Free Tibet.

China's policies which the Dalai Lama describes as "cultural genocide" marginalize Tibetans and create simmering socio-economic issues in Lhasa.

According to the Central Tibetan Administration, environmental concerns also motivated the protests. Some of Asia's most important rivers flow from the Tibetan plateau, and "are being polluted and diminished by careless industrialisation and unplanned irrigation" as stated by the Dalai Lama.

According to the Tibetan Independence Movement, Tibetans in Lhasa were angered by inflation that caused the prices of food and consumer goods to increase. Prices also continued to rise in other parts of the country, while Tibetan youth stated that equal access to jobs and education is another economic issue related to the mass settling of Han Chinese.

== Protests in Tibet ==
=== Lhasa ===
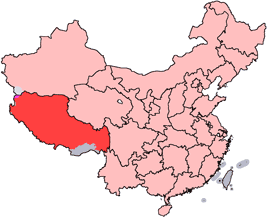
Tibet Autonomous Region

According to a report by the Human Rights Watch, a group of 300–400 protesting monks from Drepung monastery marched to Lhasa's center on 10 March in midday demanding religious freedom, and their route was blocked by police. According to the report, monks were kicked and beaten with batons and 60 monks were arrested that day.

The next day on 11 March as 300–400 monks from Sera monastery departed in a line to demand the release of the arrested Sera monks. An eyewitness told the BBC that around 300 monks from Sera monastery moved onto the street and were kicked and beat by 10 to 15 plainclothes Chinese police officers in what he described as "gratuitous violence". Outside the monastery, the monks began a sitting protest and were surrounded by riot police and armed military units. Radio Free Asia reported that an eyewitness saw tear gas being fired into the crowd. The Human Rights Watch report stated hundreds of monks and nuns from Ganden Monastery and Mani Nunnery also began marching into Lhasa on 11 March. According to the report, participants claimed that they were stopped by police and returned to their monastic centers, which were promptly cordoned off.

On 14 March, a group of monks preparing to depart from Ramoche Temple in the center of Lhasa to demand the release of monks from Drepung and Sera were barred from leaving by police. They began throwing stones at the police, some of which were hard enough to break their shields. As the police withdrew, the enraged crowd began targeting ethnic Chinese passersby. According to the Toronto Star, businesses that had Chinese markings were targeted to be burned, smashed or looted. Fires were spread to buildings, and Han and Hui people were beaten, while a building's fire killed four Han women and a Tibetan woman hiding in same building.

When Chinese police and military units reentered Lhasa on 14 March, reports state tear gas canisters were launched and shootings began. Amnesty International reports that machine guns were used. State hospitals were reported by Human Rights Watch as closed to protestors by Chinese authorities, and reports of wounded and killed Tibetans were suppressed.

Police cars, fire engines and other official vehicles were reportedly set on fire. Reports state Tibetans attacked Han and Hui passerby using stones, and an eyewitness stated from their hotel window, "It seems like it's ethnic—like they want to kill anyone not Tibetan." The witness also said he saw a group of 20 armed men firing guns, and that he was unsure if they were police officers or armed rioters. Chinese state media reported non-Tibetan-owned businesses and banks were robbed and houses were attacked and burned down, including government buildings and schools. Police used tear gas and cattle prods. According to Chinese state media, 18 civilians were killed by rioters.

A crowd of 70-80 Tibetan youths tried to storm the Lhasa Great Mosque and set fire to the front gate. Shops and restaurants in the Muslim quarter were destroyed. A Chinese businessman reported that many Hui Muslim stores were burnt. Also burnt were stationery shops, banks, and a wholesale market at Tsomtsikhang, where many shops are owned by Han Chinese and Hui Muslims.

Throughout Lhasa, raids, security sweeps and arrests by Chinese security forces reportedly continued for several days. Tsondru, a monk, is reported to have died after being thrown off a roof while under arrest by Chinese security forces. An early official statement by Tibet Autonomous Region Chairman Pema Trinley reported, "Only three law-breakers died during the pacification of the Lhasa unrest, no participation from the PLA" was revised to add that another person "jumped from a building" to avoid arrest.

=== Amdo/Gansu ===
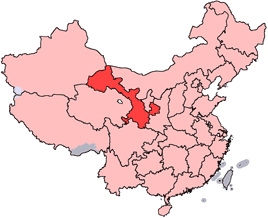
Gansu Province

On 14 March, 200 Labrang Monastery monks led a crowd of 300 people in demonstrations outside of their monastery in Gansu. The Guardian reported witness accounts of security vehicles being set on fire and Tibetan mob violence.

On 15 March, 4,000 Tibetans gathered near the Labrang Monastery and clashed with Chinese forces. The clashes centered around the Gelug school's Labrang monastery, one of the largest Buddhist monasteries in Tibet. Demonstrators marched through the streets of Xiahe. There were reports of government offices being damaged by the protesters, as well as reports of police using tear gas and shooting at protesters.

In Lanzhou on 16 March, 100 students participated in a sitting protest.

In Machu on 16 March, rioters set a government building on fire, while clashes continued on 18 March.

In Hezou on 19 March, footage emerged showing protestors tearing Chinese flags and raising Tibetan flags in their place.

China's Xinhua News Agency reported the cost of damage in Gansu at an estimated ¥230 million (US$32.7 million).

The Tibetan government-in-exile stated that 19 Tibetans were shot and killed on 18 March.

=== Amdo/Qinghai ===
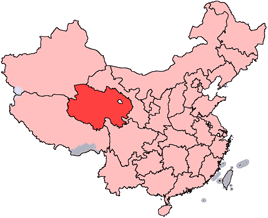
Qinghai Province

Chinese authorities arrested twelve Tibetan monks after an incident in the historic region of Rebkong, which is located in the Huangnan Tibetan Autonomous Prefecture in Qinghai (known to Tibetans as Amdo). Chinese security forces surrounded the Ditsa monastery in Bayan County. Qinghai province borders the Tibet Autonomous Region.

On 19 March, Chinese forces cordoned off the village of Taktser, where the 14th Dalai Lama was born.

In Tongren, demonstrations occurred at the Rongwo Monastery between 14 and 16 March.

In the capital city of Xining, a journalist with Neue Zürcher Zeitung reported that residents were receiving intimidating calls from the Public Security Bureau. A call received by a Tibetan professor was reported as having said "Take good care of yourself" in a threatening manner.

During special classes for students in the region, videos of Tibetan demonstrators demolishing stores and attacking police were shown. The sessions have been deemed propaganda by some. Tibetan students at the Medical University of Xining held demonstrations to express their solidarity with the protestors, as well as a vigil for killed protestors in Lhasa.

Passports belonging to Tibetans were confiscated to prevent returns to India and the delivery of reports on events to Tibetan exiles. Tourists and foreign residents were surveilled and informed about their possible expulsion in case they got involved in Tibetan protests.

=== Kham & Amdo/Sichuan ===
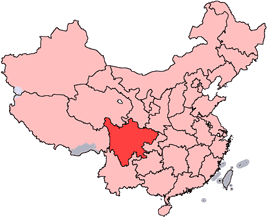
Sichuan Province

On 16 March, Tibetan monks and local residents clashed with police in Ngawa after monks held a protest at the traditional Tibetan grounds of Kham and Amdo. A witness told the BBC that approximately 17 Tibetans were killed, including a school girl. By 18 March, the town was "teeming with police and soldiers".

The India-based Tibetan Centre for Human Rights and Democracy reported that at least seven people were shot. There are other reports that police shot between 13 and 30 protesters after a police station was set on fire, reports of at least one policeman being killed, and the burning three or four police vans. Reports on the exact number of deaths were difficult due to the expulsion of journalists. The Chinese government stated that it opened fire on protestors in self defense on 20 March, reporting that four were wounded.

In Ngawa Town, after days of protests by 3,000 monks and 300 nuns, 27 of the nuns at the Kirti monasteries and nunneries were arrested by Chinese police forces on 20 March. Photographs of killed protestors near Kirti were circulated.

Neue Zürcher Zeitung reported that phone calls into the region from Zurich were intercepted, and exiled Tibetans were harassed during the calls. The arrested nuns were not heard from afterwards. During a telephone call, a nun stated she and the other nuns had no regrets, and that "the road of liberty is long and arduous".

A wave of arrests occurred in Sertar on 21 March, where police shot and killed a protestor. Chinese army troops blocked roads in Sertar, and many Tibetans were arrested. The London-based Free Tibet Campaign reported that troops had been sent to the county after protesters used explosives to destroy a bridge near the village of Gudu.

Radio Free Asia reported demonstrations in Kardze on 23 April, and on 11–12 May when 14 of the nuns demanding the release of two arrested in April were beaten and detained. The report states nuns were from nearby nunneries, and armed Chinese forces continued to patrol the area. Other protests were held in Chori.

The BBC reported that around 16 March, 600 monks from Lhasa were flown to Chengdu by Chinese security forces.

== Responses from Chinese government and Dalai Lama ==
Chinese Premier Wen Jiabao blamed the Dalai Lama's supporters for the recent violence in Tibet, and asserted that security forces exercised restraint in their response.

The Dalai Lama called for both sides to avoid using violence and called on Chinese leaders to "address the long simmering resentment of the Tibetan people through dialogue with the Tibetan people." A spokesman for the 14th Dalai Lama said the Chinese government's accusations were "absolutely baseless". The Dalai Lama has also stated that Tibetans are treated by China as second-class citizens in their own land, which has caused simmering resentment, and has repeatedly denied any involvement in organizing or inciting the unrest, and proposed to resign as the political leader if the violence continued.

A reporter for The Economist, James Miles, when asked in an interview if the Dalai Lama was responsible for the riots, responded that he "didn't see any evidence of any organized activity", opining that "it's more likely that what we saw was inspired by a general desire of Tibetans both inside Tibet and among the Dalai Lama's followers, to take advantage of this Olympic year, but also inspired simply by all these festering grievances on the ground in Lhasa." He noted in another report that the rioting "seemed to be primarily an eruption of ethnic hatred".

On 1 April, rhetoric increased when the Chinese Public Security Ministry alleged that Tibet's supporters were planning suicide attacks, stating that searches of monasteries had turned up 176 guns, 13,013 bullets, 19,000 sticks of dynamite, 7,725 pounds of unspecified explosives, two hand grenades, and 350 knives. Samdhong Rinpoche, prime minister of the Tibetan government-in-exile, denied these allegations, stating "Tibetan exiles are one-hundred-percent committed to nonviolence. There is no question of suicide attacks. But we fear that Chinese might masquerade as Tibetans and plan such attacks to give bad publicity to Tibetans".

On 14 April, Chinese forces claimed that they had found semi-automatic firearms hidden throughout a temple in Ngawa. Chinese police officers told Chinese reporters, "they were modified semi-automatic weapons."

=== Riot actions ===
China responded by deploying the People's Armed Police. The BBC reported seeing over 400 troop carriers mobilizing into Tibet, which would represent a deployment of up to 4,000 troops. The Chinese authorities ordered all Hong Kong and foreign journalists to leave Lhasa. According to General Yang Deping, regular military troops from the People's Liberation Army were not deployed.

Chinese authorities were also reportedly concerned that the Tibetan protests could "embolden activists in restive Xinjiang province" to organise street protests as well. The Chinese government's People's Daily reported a statement by Gyaincain Norbu, which condemned the unrest, stating

"the rioters' acts not only harmed the interests of the nation and the people, but also violated the aim of Buddhism [...] We strongly condemn the crime of a tiny number of people to hurt the lives and properties of the people."

In addition to sealing off monasteries, an eyewitness at Sera Monastery claimed, "they [Chinese authorities] were grabbing monks, kicking and beating them." In Ngawa, police fired at the crowd after protestors reportedly burned down government buildings including the local police station, destroyed vehicles including police vehicles, stabbed police officers with swords, and attempted to take firearms from the police, during which the police fired warning shots to no avail. The government stated that the police acted in self-defense. According to the Chinese government, four protesters were wounded, and 18 civilians, along with a police officer, were killed. The Tibetan government-in-exile claimed there were at least 99 deaths across the region.

=== PRC and Dalai Lama dialogues ===
On March 19, Premier Wen Jiabao condemned the Dalai Lama's alleged role in the riot, but said the possibility for a dialogue remained open if he renounced Tibetan independence, and if he "recognizes Tibet and Taiwan as inalienable parts of the Chinese territory". The Dalai Lama has repeatedly stated he seeks autonomy, not independence, citing the need for Tibet to develop as a modern nation.

On May 4, two representatives of the PRC government, Zhu Weiqun and Sitar met with two representatives of the Dalai Lama, Lodi Gyari and Kelsang Gyaltsen, in the southern Chinese city of Shenzhen. The two sides exchanged views and agreed that a further round of talks should be held at an appropriate time.

Plans for the meeting had been announced by the Xinhua News Agency on April 25, and was confirmed by the Dalai Lama's spokesman.

This was the first high-level dialogue between the Dalai Lama's representatives and the PRC government since the March unrest, and was the continuation of a series of talks between the Chinese government and the Dalai Lama's representatives, including his immediate family and close aides.

A second meeting was scheduled for June 11. However, due to the 2008 Sichuan earthquakes, the two sides agreed to postpone the meeting. The second meeting was held on July 1.

== Casualties and fatalities ==
China's state media Xinhua News Agency reported on early Saturday, 15 March, that 10 people had been burned to death by Tibetans, including two hotel employees and two shop owners. It also reported that the victims were all innocent civilians and that most of them were business people. The state-run People's Daily reported on 21 March that, according to the Tibet regional government, 18 civilians and 1 police officer had been confirmed dead in the unrest by the night of Friday, 14 March. It also reported the number of injured civilians rose to 382 from 325, 58 of whom were critically wounded. 241 police officers were injured, 23 of whom were critically wounded.

On 17 March, Tibet Autonomous Region governor Champa Phuntsok announced that 16 had been confirmed dead over the weekend's violence and dozens injured. Other sources published after the same press conference indicate that China put the death toll in Lhasa at 13. The Associated Press later reported that the Chinese government's official death toll from the previous week's rioting in Lhasa had risen to 22. Accordingly, the death toll reported by Xinhua had risen to 19.

The 14th Dalai Lama said China was causing a cultural genocide in Tibet, and the Central Tibetan Administration reported by 16 March to have confirmed at least 80 deaths of Tibetans, then increased the death count by Chinese forces to more than 140 people, as reported on 5 April. The Central Tibetan Administration's number of Tibetans killed since increased to 220, including subsequent deaths through to January 2009.

A month after the unrest began on 10 March, the Dalai Lama stated that since the beginning of the demonstrations in Tibet at least 400 people had been killed, and thousands of others arrested.

Foreign tourists and Chinese eyewitnesses in Lhasa said "they saw and heard repeated gunfire there on Friday", 14 March. Although Phuntsok claimed that Chinese police did not fire their guns or use anti-personnel weapons against the Tibetan protesters, additional reports from BBC, Central Tibetan Administration, Tibetan Review, Human Rights Watch and Amnesty International contradict Puncog's claim and state "indiscriminate shootings" by Chinese forces occurred, and that leaked evidence of machine gun use has been documented. Puncog also states Tibetans wounded 61 police officers, including six seriously, and reported that 13 civilians had been killed. According to reporter James Miles, the police fatalities included both Tibetans and Han officers.

A blockade by China of monasteries was reported by an Indian newspaper and Phayul, a news source affiliated with Central Tibetan Administration. The police had blocked off water, electricity, food and health facilities in Sera Monastery, Drepung monastery, Ganden monastery and at other monasteries active in the demonstrations. As a consequence, monks were suffering starvation, and on 25 March, one monk died from starvation at Ramoche Temple.

On 28 March, the International Herald Tribune reported 5 female retail workers had been burned alive when Tibetan rioters set fire to the Yishion clothing store where they worked. The article noted one of them was Tibetan.

On April 30, state press acknowledged that a pro-independence gunman and a police officer were killed in a gun battle.

In October 2009, four Tibetans were executed in connection with their involvement with the unrest.

== Arrests and disappearances ==
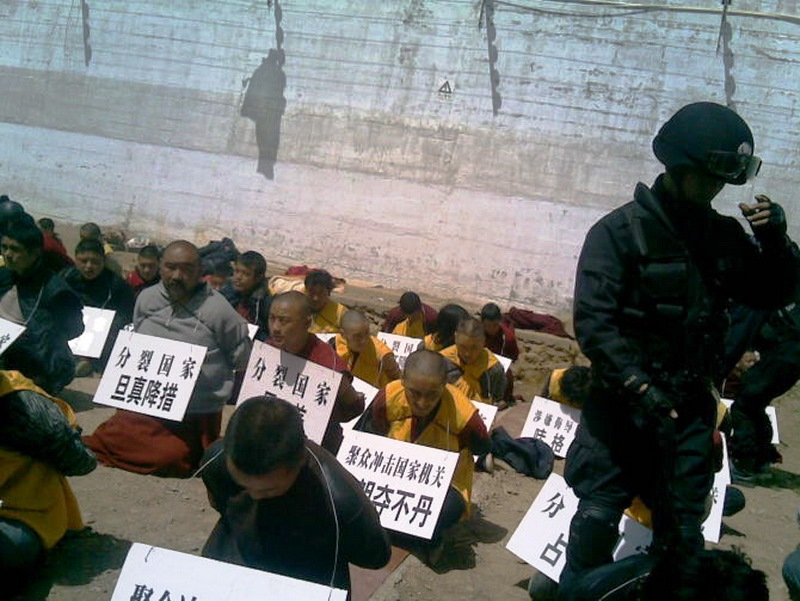
Tibetans arrested by Chinese authorities. The signs list their crime and their name.

The BBC, sourcing information from a Human Rights Watch report, reported that "witnesses recounted that monks who initially tried to go through the police lines were thrown to the ground, kicked, and taken away." The arrest of 15 monks from Sera Monastery was confirmed by state-run China Tibet News, which added 13 of the monks were prosecuted. The Human Rights Watch report stated that "up to 60 monks were arrested" on 10 March in Lhasa.

The first non-monastic Tibetans were reportedly arrested in Barkhor Square on 11 March.

In Aba Town, Free Tibet reported on 21 March that dozens of nuns from Mani Nunnery were arrested, while many more Tibetans in the area were reported as missing.

Another report on the Kardze area from Radio Free Asia in May 2008 states at least 200 people were detained after 24 March, while 7 nuns were sentenced to prison and 107 nuns were detained. The Tibetan Centre for Human Rights and Democracy reported that three nuns from Dragkar Nunnery detained in Kardze were tortured, reportedly leading to the death and disappearance of one of the nuns.

During a Chinese state sponsored tour for journalists on 7 April, two monks at Labrang Monastery that spoke out to reporters have since disappeared.

Amnesty International reported in June 2008 that over 1,000 Tibetan protesters detained by Chinese authorities were "unaccounted for", while more than 1,000 monks, nuns, students and citizens had disappeared by 2008. Another report from Amnesty International stated 5,600 Tibetans were arrested through to January 2009.

By 5 April, the Tibetan Centre for Human Rights and Democracy reported that the Chinese authorities had arrested over 2,300 Tibetans from various parts of Tibet, and claimed that "Tibetans are sometimes secretly killed in detention".

The TCHRD also reported that a 38-year-old Tibetan woman, who was involved in protests on 16 and 17 March in Ngaba County, died after reportedly being tortured in a Chinese prison. Following her release, the government hospital allegedly refused to admit her.

According to a 10 October 2009 report by the U.S. Congressional-Executive Commission on China, at least 670 Tibetans had been imprisoned in 2009 for activities that included peaceful protest or leaking information to the outside world.

On 7 November, the state-run Lhasa Evening News reported a retired doctor was sentenced in Lhasa to 15 years imprisonment on espionage charges for passing information to the Central Tibetan Administration. The sentencing corresponds to the PRC's concealment of hospital records, as Human Rights Watch reported.

== Media coverage ==
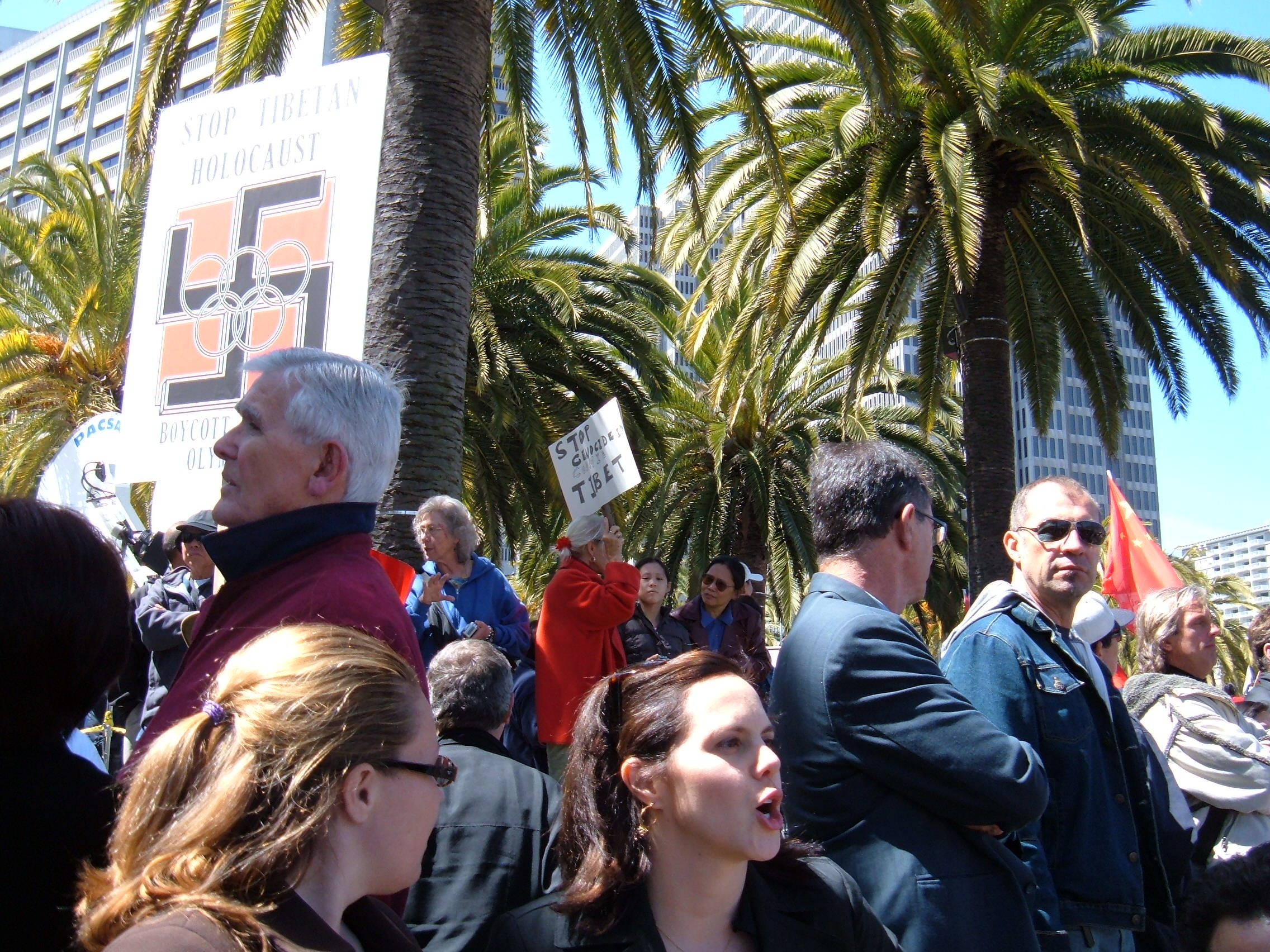
Protest in San Francisco, US

During the protests and demonstrations, Chinese authorities prohibited foreign and Hong Kong media from entering Tibet and expelled those already there. Two German reporters, Georg Blume of Die Zeit and Kristin Kupfer of Profil, left Tibet on March 18 due to pressure from the authorities, and James Miles, a correspondent from The Economist, said that China "insisted however that when my permit did expire on the 19th that I had to leave. I asked for an extension and they said decisively no." Domestic Chinese media initially downplayed the riots, but this changed relatively quickly as they began to focus on the violence against Han citizens. There was speculation that the violence would affect attendance at the 2008 Olympic Games, particularly amid pressure for leaders to boycott the games, but the calls for boycott went largely unheeded.

Tania Branigan of The Guardian reported the Chinese government blocked foreign broadcasters and websites, and denied journalists access to protest areas. Websites such as YouTube, The Guardian website, portions of the Yahoo! portal, and sections of The Times website had been restricted.

The Chinese media accused Western media of reporting with inaccuracy and little independent cross-checking. The Chinese state-run newspaper China Daily accused Western media of deliberately misrepresenting the situation. Among these accusations involved CNN's use of a cropped picture that shows only a military truck but not rioters who were attacking it. John Vause, who reported this story, responded to the criticism saying, "technically it was impossible to include the crashed car on the left". The CNN image was later replaced with one that was cropped differently. On 24 March, the German TV news channel RTL Television disclosed that a photograph depicting rioters had been erroneously captioned. Separately, another German station, n-tv, admitted that it had mistakenly aired footage from Nepal during a story on Chinese riots. The Agence France-Presse reported that Chinese students abroad had set up the website Anti-CNN to collect evidence of "one-sided and untrue" foreign reporting. Media accused of falsified reporting include CNN, Fox News, The Times, Sky News, Der Spiegel, and the BBC. Der Spiegel has rejected the accusations in an article. According to The New York Times, CNN apologized on May 18 over some comments made on April 9.

Chinese TV channels aired footage of anti-Chinese riots in Lhasa and the aftermath which was broadcast for several hours. China's Communist Party newspaper, the People's Daily, called on the government to "resolutely crush the 'Tibet independence' forces' conspiracy and sabotaging activities". The People's Daily also accused the Dalai Lama and the Central Tibetan Administration of orchestrating the protests in its commentary. Yahoo! China published "most wanted" posters across its homepage to assist Chinese police in apprehending protestors; 24 Tibetans are believed to have been arrested as a result.

On 17 March, the Toronto Star reported the accounts of various Canadian witnesses who were caught up in the violence. One Canadian witnessed an attack by a mob on a motorcyclist, others recounted how the violence of the riots forced them to escape with help from taxi drivers and guides, and another described how they intervened to save a Han Chinese man from a mob.

=== Foreign reporter group ===
After expelling foreign journalists, the Chinese government selected a group of foreign journalists which were given restricted access to the region. The Agence France-Presse and Deutsche Welle reported on the decision by the Chinese government, which allowed a small group of reporters to tour Tibet. The journalists allowed to tour Tibet included those from The Wall Street Journal, USA Today, Financial Times, Kyodo News Agency, the Korean Broadcasting System, Al-Jazeera, and the Associated Press. The journalists were kept under close control while in Lhasa. Chinese authorities said the limited number of journalists permitted to attend and the restrictions on their movements were based on logistical considerations.

On 27 March, the media tour through Lhasa was disrupted by a group of detained monks from Jokhang Monastery. Reports from Taiwanese journalists also invited on the tour stated that the Jokhang monks told them that they had been locked down in the temple even though they had not participated in the riots, and implored the journalists to report the information. Padma Choling, the vice-chairman of the Tibetan Autonomous Region, stated that they were locked down pending police interviews in relation to the riots, and that they were released once interviewed. He also promised that the monks involved in the protest would be "dealt with" according to law. The Tibetan activist group International Campaign for Tibet stated on 28 March that it feared for the welfare and whereabouts of the monks which spoke out during the media tour, specifically those monks from Sera Monastery, Drepung Monastery, Ganden Monastery and Ramoche Temple. The group did not explain why it identified four monasteries when the protest involved only monks from Jokhang. Choling later told reporters the monks would not be punished. Detained monks at Labrang Monastery also reportedly spoke to the journalists on tour, and likewise implored them to report their detainment.

== International reaction ==
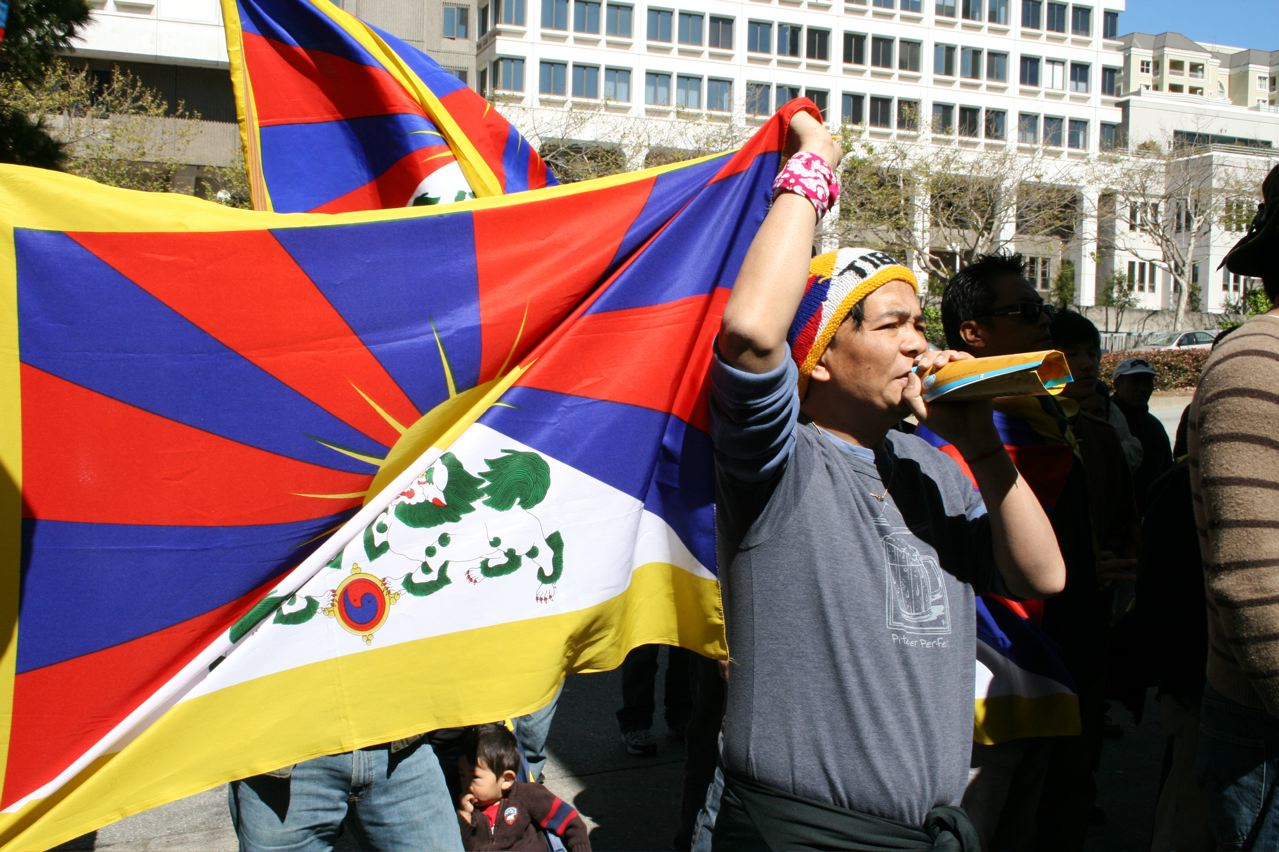
A Free Tibet rally outside the Chinese consulate in San Francisco, California, on March 17, 2008

According to Wen Jiabao, the Premier of the People's Republic of China, attacks on between ten and twenty Chinese embassies and consulates occurred around the same time as attacks on non-Tibetan interests in the Tibet Autonomous Region and several other ethnic Tibetan areas.

According to an article by Doug Saunders published in The Globe and Mail, the protests were loosely coordinated by a group of full-time organizers hired by two umbrella groups that were loyal to the Tibetan government in exile. Documents were sent to more than 150 Tibet support groups around the world giving them detailed notes on how to behave when organizing similar disruptions as the Olympic flame made its six-month trip around the world. This included advice on maintaining non-violence and following the Dalai Lama's opposition to Tibetan national independence. Protesters were to advocate a more autonomous Tibet within China. However, many of the protestors did not follow this advice. Doug Saunders further stated that the torch-relay protests had no relationship with the unrest in Tibet.

== Impact on the 2008 Summer Olympics ==
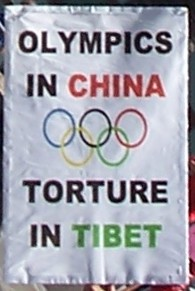
Sign from 2008 Olympic protests

There were rumors that some athletes were considering boycotting the 2008 Summer Olympics over the unrest. The vice-president of the International Olympic Committee discouraged this, as well as the European Union and the Olympic Committees of Europe and Australia, who condemned politicizing sport. The 14th Dalai Lama also reiterated that he was against any boycott.

The attendance of government leaders at the 2008 Summer Olympics opening ceremony was watched by the media, because some groups called for a boycott of the ceremony on both human rights and Tibetan violence grounds. Nonetheless, by the end of July 2008, the leaders of more than 80 countries had decided to attend the opening ceremony of the Beijing Olympics, more than in any of the preceding Olympics. All but one leader of the countries that did not attend the opening ceremonies emphasized that it was not to boycott the Olympics; one German chancellor said that there was "no link to Tibet". Prime Minister of Poland Donald Tusk was the one European head of government to boycott the opening ceremonies because of the violence in Tibet.

On 20 March, the U.S. Department of State issued a warning to U.S. citizens attending the Beijing Olympics, stating that "Americans' conversations and telephones could be monitored and their rooms could be searched without their knowledge or consent".

== Aftermath ==
According to the People's Daily, normalcy returned on 24 March to some affected areas in Sichuan Province, as schools, shops and restaurants reopened to the public.

The Open Constitution Initiative (OCI), operated by several Weiquan lawyers and intellectuals, issued a paper in May 2009 challenging the official narrative and suggesting that the protests were a response to economic inequities, Han Chinese migration, and religious sentiments. The OCI recommended that Chinese authorities better respect and protect the rights and interests of the Tibetan people, including religious freedom.

== See also ==
- Annexation of Tibet by the People's Republic of China
- Buddhism and violence
- Censorship in China
- Cultural repression in Tibet
- History of Tibet (1950–present)
- Human rights in China
- Human rights in Tibet
- Lhakar
- Phurbu Tsering Rinpoche
- Protests and uprisings in Tibet since 1950
- Racism in China
- Sinicization of Tibet
- Tibetan independence movement
- Tibetan sovereignty debate
- Persecution of Buddhists § Tibet
- Anti-Chinese sentiment § Tibet
- List of massacres in China
