= History of Tibet (1950–present) =

The history of Tibet from 1950 to the present includes the Chinese annexation of Tibet, during which Tibetan representatives signed the controversial Seventeen Point Agreement following the Battle of Chamdo and establishing an autonomous administration led by the 14th Dalai Lama under Chinese sovereignty. Subsequent socialist reforms and other unpopular policies of the Chinese Communist Party led to armed uprisings, eventually assisted by the CIA, and their violent suppression. During the 1959 Tibetan uprising, the 14th Dalai Lama escaped to northern India for fear of being captured by Chinese forces. He formed the Central Tibetan Administration and rescinded the Seventeen Point Agreement. In 1965, the majority of Tibet's land mass, including all of U-Tsang and parts of Kham and Amdo, was established as the Tibet Autonomous Region. Tibetans suffered along with the rest of China during the Great Chinese Famine and the Cultural Revolution under episodes of starvation, religious repression, destruction of cultural sites, forced labour, and political persecution. US-China rapprochement in the 1970s saw an end to Washington's support for Tibetan guerillas. Amid broader reforms across the country, China adopted policies to improve conditions in Tibet. Since the 2000s, it has invested heavily in the region but generated controversies due to the sinicization of Tibet. Human rights abuses remain a concern especially where it comes to freedom of religion and political prisoners.

== 1950–1955: Traditional systems ==
In 1949, seeing that the Communists were gaining control of China, the Kashag expelled all Chinese connected with the Chinese government, over the protests of both the Kuomintang and the Communists. Tibet was its own de facto country before 1951. but both the Republic of China (ROC) and the People's Republic of China (PRC) have maintained China's claim to sovereignty over Tibet.

The Chinese Communist government led by Mao Zedong, which came to power in October, lost little time in asserting a new PRC presence in Tibet. The PRC has carried out different projects in Tibet but the people of Tibet seem to feel ignored politically and economically in the "Tibet Autonomous Region" and in the Tibetan portions of land in Qinghai, Sichuan, and Yunnan. In June 1950, the UK Government in the House of Commons stated that His Majesty's Government "have always been prepared to recognize Chinese suzerainty over Tibet, but only on the understanding that Tibet is regarded as autonomous." On 7 October 1950, The People's Liberation Army invaded the Tibetan area of Chamdo. The large number of units of the PLA quickly surrounded the outnumbered, largely less militarized Tibetan forces. By October 19, 1950, five thousand Tibetan troops surrendered to the PRC.

In 1951, representatives of Tibetan authority, with the Dalai Lama's authorization, participated in negotiations with the PRC government in Beijing. This resulted in a Seventeen Point Agreement which established PRC's sovereignty over Tibet, and it thereby gave the PRC power to rule. According to author Melvin Goldstein, the agreement was ratified in Lhasa a few months later. According to the Tibetan government-in-exile, some members of the Tibetan Cabinet (Kashag), for example, Tibetan Prime Minister Lukhangwa, never accepted the agreement. But the National Assembly of Tibet, "while recognizing the extenuating circumstances under which the delegates had to sign the 'agreement', asked the government to accept the 'agreement'...the Kashag told Zhang Jingwu that it would radio its acceptance of the 'agreement'." The acceptance had three conditions that were ignored by China, which also strengthens the claim that the agreement is invalid. Tibetan exile sources generally consider it invalid, as having been signed under duress.

On the path that was leading him into exile in India, the 14th Dalai Lama arrived March 26, 1959 at Lhuntse Dzong where he repudiated the 17-point Agreement as having been "thrust upon Tibetan Government and people by the threat of arms" and reaffirmed his government as the only legitimate representative of Tibet. According to the Seventeen Point Agreement, the Tibetan area under the Dalai Lama's authority was supposed to be a highly autonomous area of China. From the beginning, it was obvious that incorporating Tibet into Communist PRC would bring two opposite social systems face-to-face. In western Tibet, however, the Chinese Communists opted not to make social reform an immediate priority. On the contrary, from 1951 to 1959, traditional Tibetan society with its lords and manorial estates continued to function unchanged and were subsidized by the central government. Despite the presence of twenty thousand PLA troops in Central Tibet, the Dalai Lama's government was permitted to maintain important symbols from its de facto independence period. The first national census in all of the People's Republic of China was held in 1954, counting 2,770,000 ethnic Tibetans in China, including 1,270,000 in the Tibet Autonomous Region. The Chinese built highways that reached Lhasa, and then extended them to the Indian, Nepalese and Pakistani borders.

Tibetan areas in Qinghai, known as Kham, which were outside the authority of the Dalai Lama's government, did not enjoy this same autonomy and had land redistribution implemented in full. Most lands were taken away from noblemen and monasteries and re-distributed to serfs and former slaves. The Tibetan region of Eastern Kham, previously Xikang province, was incorporated into the province of Sichuan. Western Kham was put under the Chamdo Military Committee. In these areas, land reform was implemented. This involved communist agitators designating "landlords"—sometimes arbitrarily chosen—for public humiliation in so-called "struggle sessions", torture, maiming, and even death. It was only after 1959 that China brought the same practices to Central Tibet.

== 1956–1976: Reforms and upheaval ==
Uprisings against socialist land reforms and other policies broke out in Amdo and eastern Kham in 1956, fueling the Tibetan resistance movement. Armed rebellions initially attained considerable success, and with CIA support much of southern Tibet fell into the hands of guerilla fighters such as the Chushi Gangdruk. During the fighting, tens of thousands of Tibetans were killed. Due to the suppression of religious practices in Tibet, the 14th Dalai Lama and other Tibetans sometimes sought refuge in India.

Speculations that the Dalai Lama might be abducted led to further violence and revolt in 1959, but the Tibetan forces were outnumbered and poorly armed. Their accounts claim that during a Chinese operation launched in Lhasa, 10,000 to 15,000 Tibetans were killed within three days. Artillery shells landed near the Potala Palace. Fearing the capture of the 14th Dalai Lama, Tibetan civilians surrounded his residence, at which point the Dalai Lama fled with the help of the CIA to India. On 28 March, the Chinese installed the Panchen Lama, who had been under their watch, in Lhasa and claimed that he was the head of the Government of Tibet in the absence of the Dalai Lama.

The Tibetan Government in Exile estimates that 87,000 Tibetans were killed during the 1959 uprising, though this is not widely accepted by Western nor Chinese scholars. Tibetologist Tom Grunfeld said "the veracity of such a claim is difficult to verify." Warren W. Smith, a writer with Radio Free Asia, points out that the 87,000 losses were not necessarily killed.

=== Guerilla warfare ===
After 1959, Tibetan resistance forces operated from Nepal. Around 2,000 rebels were based out of the semi-independent Kingdom of Mustang; many of them trained at Camp Hale near Leadville, Colorado, in the United States Tibetan exiles claim that 430,000 died in total during the 1959 uprising and the subsequent years of guerrilla warfare. Organized warfare died down after American support was withdrawn and the Nepalese military dismantled the operation in the 1970s.

=== Famine ===
China suffered widespread famine between the years 1959 and 1961. The causes are disputed. Drought and poor weather played a part, and the policies of the Great Leap Forward contributed to the famine, but the relative weights of each cause are unclear. Estimates of deaths vary; according to official government statistics, there were 15 million deaths. across all of China due to the famine Scholars have estimated the number of famine victims to be as high as 55 million. During the Seven Thousand Cadres Conference in early 1962, Liu Shaoqi, then President of China, formally attributed 30% of the famine to natural disasters and 70% to man-made errors.

Exact numbers on the Tibet region are not available as the Tibet Autonomous Region had not yet been established and data collection at the time was poor. However, in May 1962, the Tenth Panchen Lama sent Chinese Premier Zhou Enlai a confidential report detailing the suffering of the Tibetan people, which became known as the 70,000 Character Petition:

"In many parts of Tibet people have starved to death.. . . In some places, whole families have perished and the death rate is very high. This is very abnormal, horrible and grave...In the past Tibet lived in a dark barbaric feudalism but there was never such a shortage of food, especially after Buddhism had spread....In Tibet from 1959 to 1961, for two years almost all animal husbandry and farming stopped. The nomads have no grain to eat and the farmers have no meat, butter or salt."

It was the opinion of the Panchen Lama that these deaths were a result of official policies, not of any natural disasters, which was the situation understood in Beijing by Chairman Mao and the Central People's Government. The Panchen Lama also described the uniqueness of the famine that Tibet suffered from: "There was never such an event in the history of Tibet. People could not even imagine such horrible starvation in their dreams. In some areas if one person catches a cold, then it spreads to hundreds and large numbers simply die."

The 70,000 Character Petition was criticized by Barry Sautman from Hong Kong University of Science and Technology. According to Sautman, the 10th Panchen Lama is purported to have visited three counties before writing his report: the counties of Ping’an, Hualong and Xunhua, but his description of a famine concerns only Xunhua, his native region. All three counties are in Haidong Prefecture, a part of Qinghai province whose population is 90% non-Tibetan and does not belong to “cultural Tibet”. Exiled Tibetan writer Jamyang Norbu accuses Sautman of downplaying PRC activities in Tibet and Xinjiang.

Sautman also stated that the claim that Tibet was the region most hit by China's famine of 1959–1962 is based not on statistics gathered in Tibetan areas, but on anonymous refugee reports lacking in numerical specificity. Sautman's conclusions recently subjected to criticism.

=== International Commission of Jurists ===
==== Background ====
Under the 1951 Seventeen Point Agreement the Central People's Government of the Chinese People's Republic gave a number of undertakings, among them: promises to maintain the existing political system of Tibet, to maintain the status and functions of the Dalai Lama and the Panchen Lama, to protect freedom of religion and the monasteries and to refrain from compulsion in the matter of reforms in Tibet. A report sponsored by the International Commission of Jurists (ICJ) found that these and other undertakings had been violated by the Chinese People's Republic, and that the Government of Tibet was entitled to repudiate the Agreement as it did on March 11, 1959.

==== Genocide of religion ====
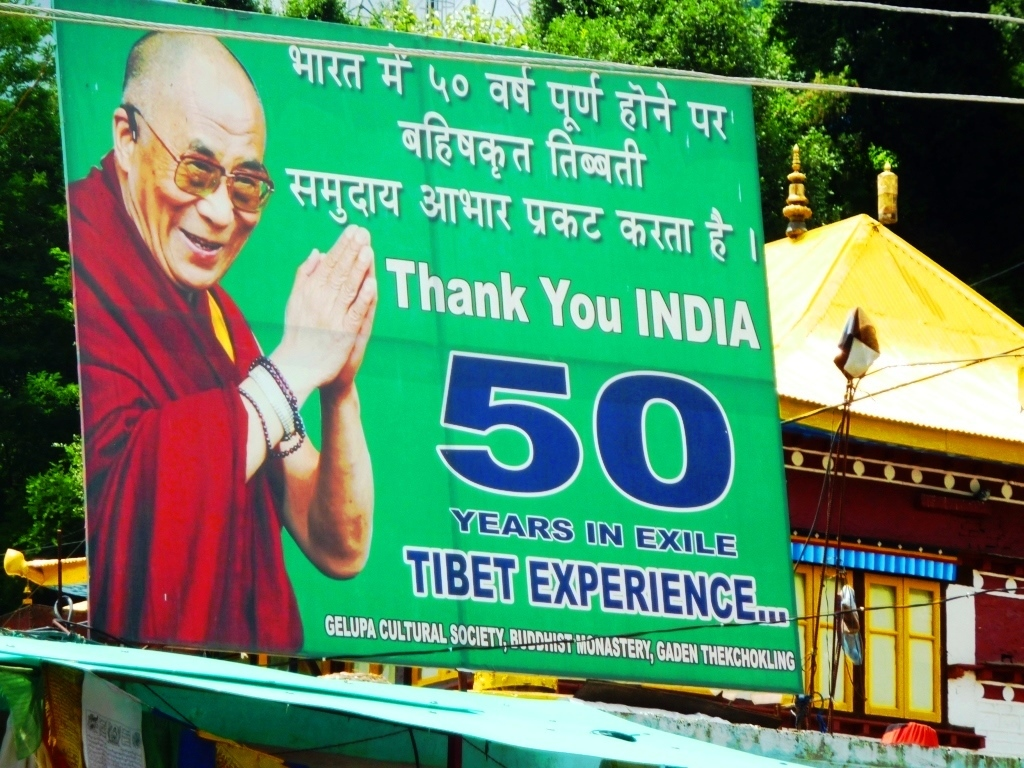
Thank you India. 50 Years in Exile. Manali. 2010

In 1960 a report titled Tibet and the Chinese People's Republic to the United Nations was submitted to the ICJ. Its authors included eleven lawyers from around the world. They accused the Chinese government of genocide against Tibetans as a religious group, although not as a race, nation or ethnic group. The authors of the report examined evidence relating to human rights within the structure of the Universal Declaration of Human Rights as announced by the General Assembly of the United Nations and found that the Chinese communist authorities had violated Articles 3, 5, 9, 12, 13, 16, 17, 18, 19, 20, 21, 22, 24, 25, 26 and 27 of the Universal Declaration of Human Rights in Tibet.

Other Tibetans have offered accounts of massacres, tortures and killings, bombardment of monasteries, extermination of whole nomad camps, and the use of military equipment provided by the Soviet Union for Chinese punitive operations in Tibet.

According to the report, Tibetans were not allowed to participate in the cultural life of their own community, and Chinese allegations that the Tibetans enjoyed no human rights before the entry of the Chinese were based on distorted and exaggerated accounts of life in Tibet. Accusations against the Tibetan "rebels" of rape, plunder and torture were found in cases of plunder to have been deliberately fabricated and in other cases unworthy of belief for this and other reasons.

In spite of claims by the Chinese government that most of the damage to Tibet's institutions occurred subsequently during the Cultural Revolution (1966–1976), the destruction of most of Tibet's more than 6,000 monasteries happened between 1959 and 1961. During the mid-1960s, the monastic estates were broken up and secular education introduced. During the Cultural Revolution, Red Guards, which included Tibetan members, inflicted a campaign of organized vandalism against cultural sites in the entire PRC, including Buddhist sites in Tibet. According to at least one Chinese source, only a handful of the most important monasteries remained without major damage.

==== Criticism ====
A. Tom Grunfeld asserts that the United States took advantage of the Dalai Lama's leaving Tibet by prodding its clandestinely funded Cold War International Commission of Jurists to prepare propagandistic reports attacking China. In his 1994 book The International Commission of Jurists, Global Advocates for Human Rights, Howard B. Tolley Jr. explains how the ICJ was created and bankrolled by the CIA from 1952 to 1967 as an instrument of the Cold War without most ICJ officers and members knowing about it. The connection between the CIA and the early ICJ is also mentioned by Dorothy Stein in her book People Who Count. Population and Politics, Women and Children, published in 1995. She accuses the Commission of growing out of a group created by American intelligence agents whose purpose was disseminating anti-communist propaganda. This contrasts with the official overview of the International Commission of Jurists, which is "dedicated to the primacy, coherence and implementation of international law and principles that advance human rights" and the "impartial, objective and authoritative legal approach to the protection and promotion of human rights through the rule of law" while providing "legal expertise at both the international and national levels to ensure that developments in international law adhere to human rights principles and that international standards are implemented at the national level."

=== Establishment of TAR ===
In 1965, the area that had been under the control of the Dalai Lama's government from 1951 to 1959 (Ü-Tsang and western Kham) was renamed the Tibet Autonomous Region or TAR. Autonomy provided that head of government would be an ethnic Tibetan; however, the TAR head is always subordinate to the First Secretary of the Tibet Autonomous Regional Committee of the Chinese Communist Party, who was not a Tibetan. The role of ethnic Tibetans in the higher levels of the TAR Communist Party was very limited.

=== Cultural Revolution ===
The Cultural Revolution launched in 1966 was a catastrophe for Tibet, as it was for the rest of the PRC. Large numbers of Tibetans died violent deaths due to it, and the number of intact monasteries in Tibet was reduced from thousands to less than ten. Tibetan resentment towards the Chinese deepened. Tibetans participated in the destruction, but it is not clear how many of them actually embraced the Communist ideology and how many participated out of fear of becoming targets themselves. Resistors against the Cultural Revolution included Thrinley Chodron, a nun from Nyemo, who led an armed rebellion that spread through eighteen xians (counties) of the TAR, targeting CCP officials and Tibetan collaborators, that was ultimately suppressed by the PLA. Citing Tibetan Buddhist symbols which the rebels invoked, Shakya calls this 1969 revolt "a millenarian uprising, an insurgency characterized by a passionate desire to be rid of the oppressor."

=== Number of deaths ===
Warren W. Smith, a broadcaster of Radio Free Asia (which was established by the US government), extrapolated a death figure of 400,000 from his calculation of census reports of Tibet which show 200,000 "missing" people. The Central Tibetan Administration claimed that the number that have died of starvation, violence, or other indirect causes since 1950 is approximately 1.2 million. According to Patrick French, the former director of the London-based Free Tibet Campaign and a supporter of the Tibetan cause who was able to view the data and calculations, the estimate is not reliable because the Tibetans were not able to process the data well enough to produce a credible total. French says this total was based on refugee interviews, but prevented outsider access to the data. French, who did gain access, found no names, but "the insertion of seemingly random figures into each section, and constant, unchecked duplication." Furthermore, he found that of the 1.1 million dead listed, only 23,364 were female (implying that 1.07 million of the total Tibetan male population of 1.25 million had died). Tibetologist Tom Grunfeld also finds that the figure is "without documentary evidence." There were, however, many casualties, perhaps as many as 400,000. Smith, calculating from census reports of Tibet, shows 144,000 to 160,000 "missing" from Tibet". Courtois et al. forward a figure of 800,000 deaths and allege that as many as 10% of the Tibetan populace were interned, with few survivors. Chinese demographers have estimated that 90,000 of the 300,000 "missing" Tibetans fled the region. The Chinese Communist Party (CCP) denies this. Its official toll of deaths recorded for the whole of China for the years of the Great Leap Forward is 14 million, but scholars have estimated the number of the famine victims to be between 20 and 43 million.

The Government of Tibet in Exile quotes an issue of People's Daily published in 1959 to claim that the Tibetan population has dropped significantly since 1959, counting the population of the Tibet Autonomous region but Qinghai, Gansu, and other regions inhabited by Tibetans, as the "Tibetan population". Compared as a whole to the 2000 numbers, the population in these regions has decreased, it says. These findings are in conflict with a 1954 Chinese census report that counted ethnic Tibetans. This is because in all of these provinces, Tibetans were not the only traditional ethnic group. This is held to be so especially in Qinghai, which has a historical mixture of different groups of ethnics. In 1949, Han Chinese made up 48% of the population, the rest of the ethnic groups make up 52% of the 1.5 million total population. As of today, Han Chinese account for 54% of the total population of Qinghai, which is slightly higher than in 1949. Tibetans make up around 20% of the population of Qinghai. Detailed analysis of statistical data from Chinese and Tibetan emigrant sources revealed errors in estimates of Tibetan population by regions. Although it may contain errors, data from the Government of Tibet in Exile was found to be in better correspondence with the known facts than any other existing estimates. With respect to total population of the whole Tibet in 1953 and 1959, the Tibetan side appears to provide numbers that are too high, while the Chinese side provides numbers that are too low.

== 1976–present: Rapprochement and internationalization ==
Following Mao's death in 1976, Deng Xiaoping launched initiatives of rapprochement with the exiled Tibetan leaders, hoping to persuade them to come to live in China. Ren Rong, who was Communist Party Secretary in Tibet, thought that Tibetans in Tibet were happy under Chinese Communist rule and that they shared the Chinese Communist views of the pre-Communist Tibetan rulers as oppressive despots. "By 1979 most of the estimated 600,000 monks and nuns were dead, disappeared, or imprisoned, and the majority of Tibet's 6,000 monasteries had been destroyed." So, when delegations from the Tibetan government in exile visited Tibet in 1979–80, Chinese officials expected to impress the Tibetan exiles with the progress that had occurred since 1950 and with the contentment of the Tibetan populace. Ren even organized meetings in Lhasa to urge Tibetans to restrain their animosity towards the coming representatives of an old, oppressive regime. The Chinese, then, were astonished and embarrassed at the massive, tearful expressions of devotion which Tibetans made to the visiting Tibetan exiles. Thousands of Tibetans cried, prostrated, offered scarves to the visitors, and strove for a chance to touch the Dalai Lama's brother.

These events also prompted Party Secretary Hu Yaobang and Vice Premier Wan Li to visit Tibet, where they were dismayed by the conditions they found. Hu announced a reform program intended to improve economic standards for Tibetans and to foster some freedom for Tibetans to practice ethnic and cultural traditions. In some ways, this was a return from the hard line authoritarianism and assimilation policies of the 1960s to Mao's more ethnically accommodating policies of the 1950s, with the major difference that there would be no separate Tibetan government as there had been in the 1950s. Hu ordered a change in policy, calling for the revitalization of Tibetan culture, religion, and language, the building of more universities and colleges in Tibet, and an increase in the number of ethnic Tibetans in the local government. Concurrent reform and opening up and reforms in internal migration have also resulted in Tibet seeing more Han Chinese migrant workers, though the actual number of this floating population remains disputed.

New meetings between Chinese officials and exiled leaders took place in 1981–1984, but no agreements could be reached.

In 1986–1987, the Tibetan government in exile in Dharamshala launched a new drive to win international support for their cause as a human rights issue. In response, the United States House of Representatives in June 1987 passed a resolution in support of Tibetan human rights. Between September 1987 and March 1989, four major demonstrations occurred in Lhasa against Chinese rule. American Tibetologist Melvyn Goldstein considered the riots to be spontaneous mass expressions of Tibetan resentment, sparked in part by hope that the United States would soon provide support or pressure enabling Tibet to become independent. In 1987, the Panchen Lama delivered a speech estimating the number of prison deaths in Qinghai at approximately 5 percent of the total population in the area. The United States passed a 1988–1989 Foreign Relations Act which expressed support for Tibetan human rights. The riots ironically discredited Hu's more liberal Tibetan policies and brought about a return to hard-line policies; Beijing even imposed martial law in Tibet in 1989. Emphasis on economic development brought increasing numbers of non-Tibetans to Lhasa, and the economy in Tibet became increasingly dominated by Han. Lhasa became a city where non-Tibetans reportedly equalled or outnumbered Tibetans.

When the 10th Panchen Lama addressed the Tibet Autonomous Region Standing Committee Meeting of the National People's Congress in 1987, he detailed mass imprisonment and killings of Tibetans in Amdo (Qinghai): "there were between three to four thousand villages and towns, each having between three to four thousand families with four to five thousand people. From each town and village, about 800 to 1,000 people were imprisoned. Out of this, at least 300 to 400 people of them died in prison...In Golok area, many people were killed and their dead bodies were rolled down the hill into a big ditch. The soldiers told the family members and relatives of the dead people that they should all celebrate since the rebels had been wiped out. They were even forced to dance on the dead bodies. Soon after, they were also massacred with machine guns. They were all buried there"

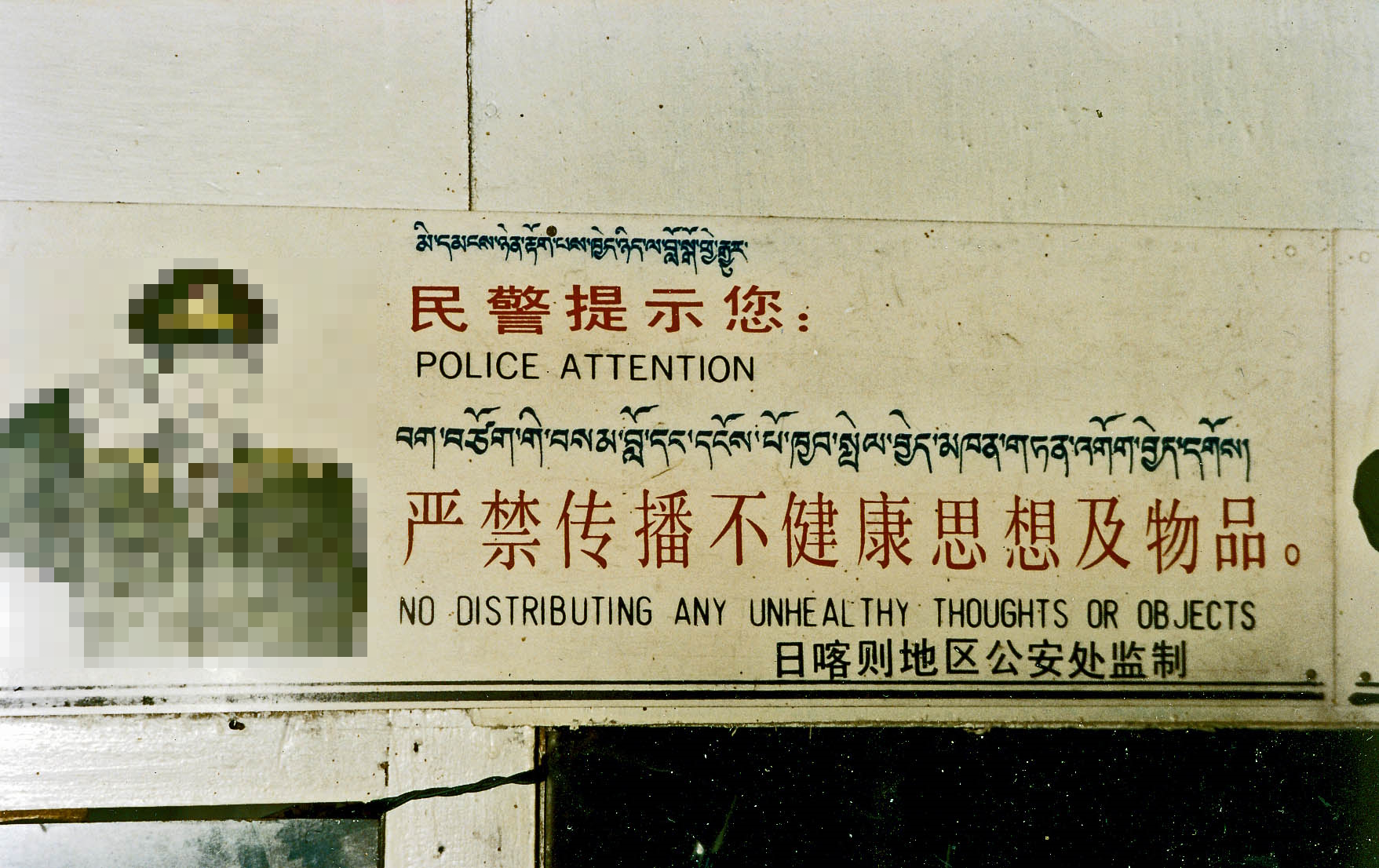
"Police Attention: No distributing any unhealthy thoughts or objects." A trilingual (Tibetan–Chinese–English) sign above the entrance to a small cafe in Nyalam Town, Tibet, 1993

Hu Jintao became the Party Chief of the Tibet Autonomous Region in 1988. According to the BBC, "many Tibetans" believe that Hu was involved in the unexpected death of the 10th Panchen Lama in January 1989. In 1990 a dissident journalist provided materials to The Observer suggesting that over 450 Tibetans had died in March 1989 and alleged that prior to the violence, the police in Lhasa had received orders from General Li Lianxiu to provoke an incident. The fourth national census was conducted in 1990, finding 4,590,000 ethnic Tibetans in China, including 2,090,000 in the TAR. The Chinese government compares these numbers to the first national census to conclude that the Tibetan population has doubled since 1951.

In 1995, the Dalai Lama named 6-year-old Gedhun Choekyi Nyima as the 11th Panchen Lama without the approval of the government of China. The PRC named another child, Gyaincain Norbu, in conflict with the Dalai Lama's choice. Gyaincain Norbu was raised in Tibet and Beijing and makes frequent public appearances related to religion and politics. The PRC-selected Panchen Lama is rejected by exiled Tibetans who commonly refer to him as the "Panchen Zuma" (literally "fake Panchen Lama"). Gedhun Choekyi Nyima and his family are missing: kidnapped, says Amnesty International, or living under a secret identity for protection and privacy, says Beijing.

=== Economic development ===
In 2000, the Chinese government launched its Western Development Strategy aimed at boosting the economies of its poorer western regions. The strategy has featured a strong bias for large-scale, capital-intensive projects such as the Qinghai-Tibet Railway. Such projects however, have roused fears of facilitating military mobilisation and Han migration. Robert Barnett reports that the economic stimulus was used by hardliners to stimulate Han migration to Tibet as a control mechanism, and that 66% of official posts in Tibet are held by Han. There is still an ethnic imbalance in appointments and promotions to the civil and judicial services in the Tibet Autonomous Region, with disproportionately few ethnic Tibetans appointed to these posts.

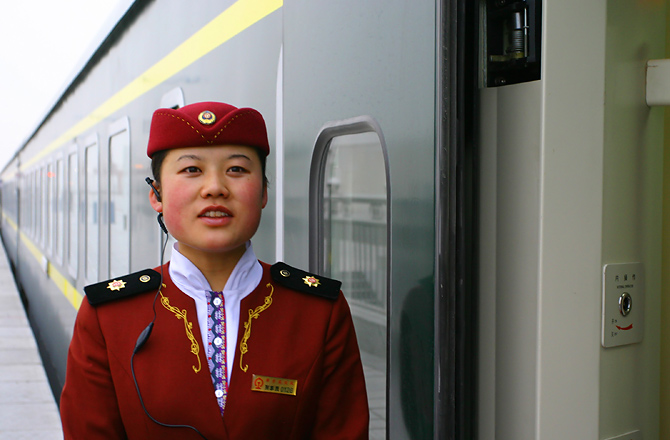
A rail attendant for the service from Xining to Lhasa

The PRC government claims that its rule over Tibet has provided economic development to Tibetan people, and that the Western Development Strategy plan is a benevolent and patriotic undertaking by the wealthier east coast to help the western parts of China catch up in terms of prosperity and living standards. On the other hand, the government maintains that the Tibetan Government did almost nothing to improve the Tibetans' material standard of life during its rule from 1913 to 1959, and that they opposed any reforms proposed by the Chinese government. According to the Chinese government, this is the reason for the tension that grew between some central government officials and the local Tibetan government in 1959. The claims of economic hardship under the Dalai Lama's government from 1913–59 are disputed by the 10th Panchen Lama in the 70,000 Character Petition; however, the Panchen Lama praised the 1980s reform and opening up under Deng Xiaoping.

The government, in turn, rejects claims that the lives of Tibetans have deteriorated, and states that the lives of Tibetans have been improved immensely compared to self-rule before 1950. Despite China's claims that the lives of Tibetans have improved immensely, a 2004 book claimed some 3,000 Tibetans brave hardship and danger to flee into exile every year. In addition, Human Rights Watch reports continued widespread abuses committed by Chinese security forces and torture by Chinese police and security forces.

The PRC claims that from 1951 to 2007, the Tibetan population in Lhasa-administered Tibet has increased from 1.2 million to almost 3 million. The GDP of the Tibet Autonomous Region (TAR) today is thirty times that of before 1950. Workers in Tibet have the second highest wages in China. The TAR has 22,500 kilometres (14,000 mi) of highways, as opposed to none in 1950. All secular education in the TAR was created after the revolution. The TAR now has 25 scientific research institutes as opposed to none in 1950. Infant mortality has dropped from 43% in 1950 to 0.66% in 2000. (The United Nations reports an infant mortality rate of 3.5% in 2000, fallen from 43.0% in 1951.) Life expectancy has risen from 35.5 years in 1950 to 67 in 2000. It points to the collection and publishing of the traditional Epic of King Gesar, which is the longest epic poem in the world and had only been handed down orally before. (However, corresponding Tibetan texts exist from the 18th century, and in the late 19th and early 20th centuries a woodblock edition of the story was compiled by a scholar-monk from Ling-tsang (a small kingdom north-east of sDe-dge) with inspiration from the prolific Tibetan philosopher Jamgon Ju Mipham Gyatso) It also highlights the allocation of 300 million Renminbi since the 1980s for the maintenance and protection of Tibetan monasteries. The Cultural Revolution and the cultural damage it wrought upon the entire PRC is generally condemned as a nationwide catastrophe, whose main instigators, in the PRC's view, the Gang of Four, have been brought to justice. The China Western Development plan is viewed by the PRC as a massive, benevolent, and patriotic undertaking by the wealthier eastern coast to help the western parts of China, including Tibet, catch up in prosperity and living standards. Annual investment reached hundreds of millions, comparable to US foreign aid to the entire continent of Africa in a year.

In 2008 the Chinese government "launched a 570-million-yuan (81.43 million U.S. dollars) project to preserve 22 historical and cultural heritage sites in Tibet, including the Zhaxi Lhunbo Lamasery as well as the Jokhang, Ramogia, Sanyai and Samgya-Goutog monasteries."

=== Human rights ===
After the 2008 unrest, Tibetan-populated areas of China remained tightly sealed off from outside scrutiny, according to Amnesty International. While Chinese authorities announced after the protests that over 1,000 individuals detained had been released, overseas Tibetan organizations claimed that at least several hundred remained in detention by the start of 2009. Following the detentions were reports of torture and other ill-treatment in detention, some cases resulting in death. Religious repression included locking down major monasteries and nunneries, and a propaganda campaign where local authorities renewed "Patriotic Education," which required Tibetans to participate in criticism sessions of the Dalai Lama and sign written denunciations of him, according to Amnesty's 2009 China report. Tibetan members of the Chinese Communist Party were also targeted, including being made to remove their children from Tibet exile community schools where they would have received a religious education. According to former political prisoners Tibet is virtually a big prison.

Protests in March 2008 developed into riots in which Tibetan mobs attacked Han and Hui people in Lhasa. The Chinese government reacted curtly, imposing curfews and pressuring journalists in Lhasa to leave the region. The international response was measured, with a number of leaders expressing concern. Some people protested in large European and North American cities and chanted slogans.

For a time after the 2008 unrest, Tibetan-populated areas of China remained off-limits to journalists, and major monasteries and nunneries were locked down, according to Amnesty International.

=== Tibetan language ===
According to Barry Sautman, 92–94% of ethnic Tibetans speak Tibetan. Among those who do not are small Tibetan minorities in areas such as Qinghai. Primary school instruction is conducted almost exclusively in Tibetan, but instruction is bilingual from secondary school onward.

Tibetologist Elliot Sperling has also noted that "within certain limits the PRC does make efforts to accommodate Tibetan cultural expression (and) the cultural activity taking place all over the Tibetan plateau cannot be ignored". Currently, "cultural Tibet" boasts three Tibetan-language television channels, one for each of the three main dialects spoken in China's Tibetan areas. The Tibet Autonomous Region possesses a 24-hour Central Tibetan-language TV channel (launched in 1999). For speakers of Amdo Tibetan, there is an Amdo Tibetan-language TV channel in Qinghai and for speakers of Khams Tibetan a recently launched TV satellite channel in Chengdu, the provincial capital of Sichuan. In October 2010, Tibetan students protested after the Chinese government published rules supporting the use of Mandarin Chinese in lessons and textbooks by 2015, with the exception of Tibetan language and English classes.

=== Ethnic composition ===
The issue of the proportion of the Han population in Tibet is a politically sensitive one and is disputed, involving the Government of Tibet in Exile, the PRC, and the Tibetan independence movement.

In 1959 the 14th Dalai Lama said he believes that China's ultimate aim is the extermination of Tibetan culture or even the absorption of Tibetan race with millions of Chinese settlers and workers in the region and the deportation of some Tibetans. The Government of Tibet in Exile said that China is sinicizing Tibet by encouraging the migration of non-ethnic Tibetans, especially Han and Hui, so that they outnumber ethnic Tibetans in the Tibetan region. Some non-Tibetans migrating to the area may end up assimilating into and adapting to the Tibetan culture of the area to a degree, given its significance in the local culture. But if they adapt a more distinct identity to the Tibetans, Tibetan culture would be more likely to become endangered, particularly if Tibetans are the minority. The PRC gives the number of Tibetans in the Tibet Autonomous Region as 2.4 million, as opposed to 190,000 non-Tibetans, and the number of Tibetans in all Tibetan autonomous entities combined (slightly smaller than the Greater Tibet claimed by exiled Tibetans) as 5.0 million, as opposed to 2.3 million non-Tibetans. In the TAR itself, much of the Han population is to be found in Lhasa. By the turn of the century, migrant workers from Sichuan had formed the largest floating population in Tibet. Most of them were motivated by economic not political reasons and aimed to return to their home province for marriage after making enough money.

This statistic is in dispute primarily based on the distinction between the area often referred to as "Greater Tibet", in which ethnic Tibetans are a minority in the overall population, and the Tibet Autonomous Region, in which ethnic Tibetans are a majority. Qinghai, which is claimed by Tibetan exile groups, is made up of many ranging cultures local to different regions within the Province. Tibetan culture is local to and alive in many villages and towns throughout Qinghai.

Some of Tibet's towns and villages are located in India and Nepal. The total population for Tibetans in India is given at 94,203, and 13,514 in Nepal. One example of this is the city of Leh in the Indian union territory of Ladakh, with a population of 27,513. The people of Leh are ethnic Tibetan, speaking Ladakhi, an East Tibetan language. Along with this, there are several Tibetan villages in northern Nepal. These regions are currently not claimed by Tibetan Exile Groups.

Referencing the population figures of Lhasa, the Dalai Lama has recently accused China of "demographic aggression" while stating that the Tibetans had been reduced to a minority "in his homeland". Exiled Tibetans have also expressed concern that the Qinghai-Tibet railway (Xining to Lhasa) is intended to further facilitate the influx of Chinese migrants. The PRC does not recognize Greater Tibet as claimed by the government of Tibet in Exile. The PRC government claims that the ethnically Tibetan areas outside the TAR were not controlled by the Tibetan government before 1959 in the first place, having been administered instead by other surrounding provinces for centuries. It further alleges that the idea of "Greater Tibet" was originally engineered by foreign imperialists in order to divide China amongst themselves (Mongolia being a striking precedent, gaining independence with Soviet backing and subsequently aligning itself with the Soviet Union).

The Government of Tibet in Exile disputes most demographic statistics released by the PRC government since they do not include members of the People's Liberation Army garrisoned in Tibet, or the floating population of unregistered migrants, and states that China is attempting to assimilate Tibet and further diminishing any chances of Tibetan political independence. CCP member Jampa Phuntsok, chairman of the TAR, has said that the central government has no policy of migration into Tibet due to its harsh high-altitude conditions, that the 6% Han in the TAR is a very fluid group mainly doing business or working, and that there is no immigration problem. (This report includes both permanent and temporary residences in Tibet, but excludes Tibetans studying or working outside of the TAR). By 2006, 3% of the permanent residences in Tibet were of Han ethnicity, according to National Bureau of Statistics of China. The TAR has the lowest population density among China's province-level administrative regions, mostly due to its mountainous and harsh geographical features. As of 2000, 92.8% of the population were ethnic Tibetans, while Han Chinese comprised 6.1% of the population. In Lhasa, the capital of TAR, Hans made up 17%, far less than what many activists have claimed. Former population control policies like the one-child policy applied only to Han Chinese, not to minorities such as Tibetans.

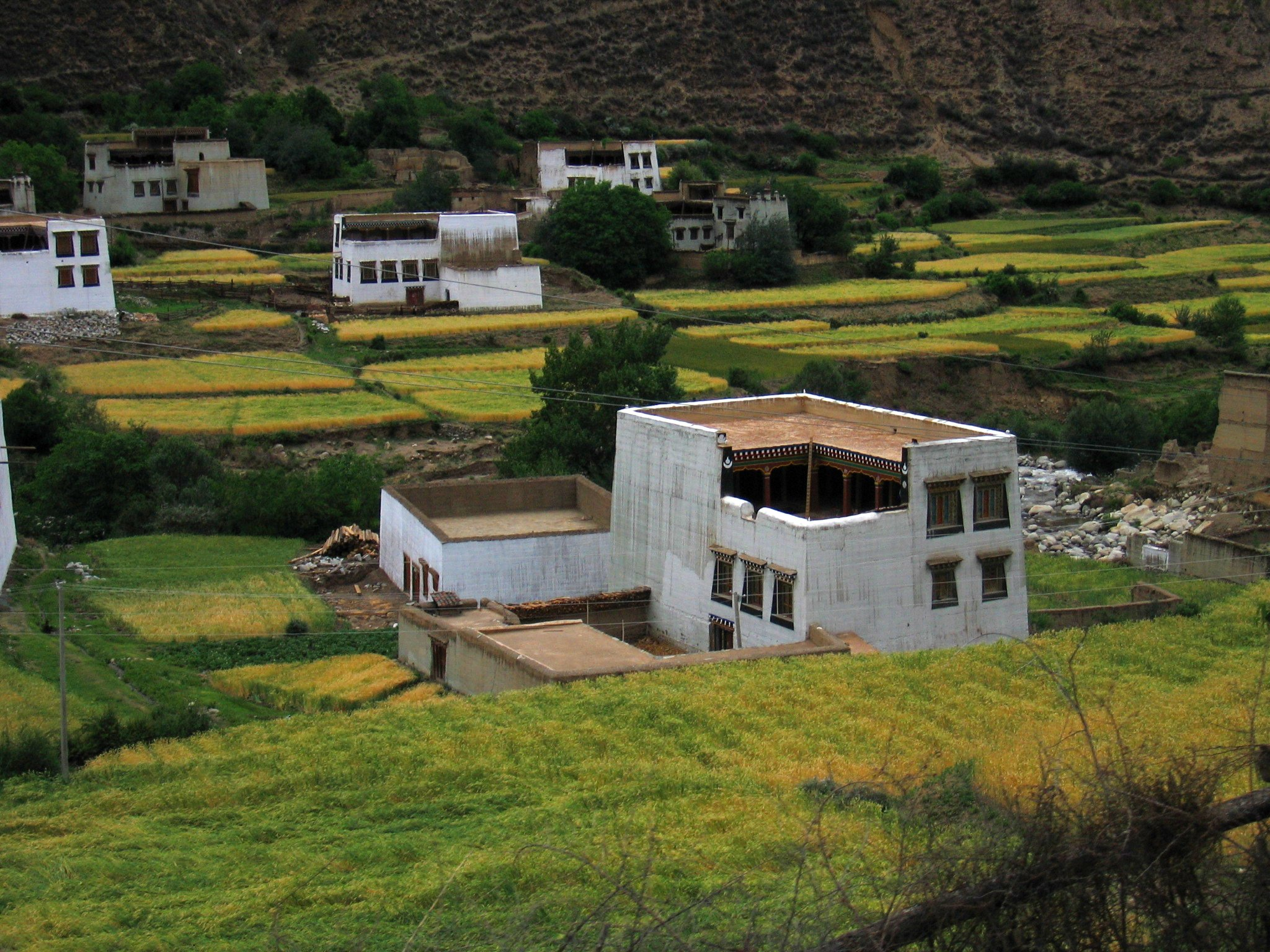
Traditional Kham houses

Sergius L. Kuzmin's review of different sources revealed that during the Cultural Revolution the Tibetan population decreased by between 3% and 30%.

Barry Sautman accused pro-independence forces of wanting the Tibetan areas cleansed of Han and the Dalai Lama of consistently misrepresenting the present situation as one of a Han majority. The Tibetan countryside, where three-fourths of the population lives, has very few non-Tibetans.

Sautman also stated:

[The settlers] are not personally subsidized by the state; although like urban Tibetans, they are indirectly subsidized by infrastructure development that favors the towns. Some 85% of Han who migrate to Tibet to establish businesses fail; they generally leave within two to three years. Those who survive economically offer competition to local Tibetan business people, but a comprehensive study in Lhasa has shown that non-Tibetans have pioneered small and medium enterprise sectors that some Tibetans have later entered and made use of their local knowledge to prosper.

Tibetans are not simply an underclass; there is a substantial Tibetan middle class, based in government service, tourism, commerce, and small-scale manufacturing/ transportation. There are also many unemployed or under-employed Tibetans, but almost no unemployed or underemployed Han because those who cannot find work leave.

In a Writenet paper written for the UNHCR, Professor Colin Mackerras (using PRC censuses) expresses the view that claims of the Chinese overtaking Tibetans in their own country and 1.2 million Tibetans dying due to Chinese occupation "should be treated with the deepest skepticism":

The figures show that since the early 1960s, the Tibetan population has been increasing, probably for the first time for centuries. What seems to follow from this is that the TGIE's allegations of population reduction due to Chinese rule probably have some validity for the 1950s but are greatly exaggerated. However, since the 1960s, Chinese rule has had the effect of increasing the population of the Tibetans, not decreasing it, largely due to a modernization process that has improved the standard of living and lowered infant, maternity and other mortality rates.

==== 2000 census according to the National Bureau of Statistics of China ====
Major ethnic groups in Greater Tibet by region, 2000 census.
	Total	Tibetans		Han Chinese		others	
Tibet Autonomous Region:	2,616,329	2,427,168	92.8%	158,570	6.1%	30,591	1.2%
– Lhasa PLC	474,499	387,124	81.6%	80,584	17.0%	6,791	1.4%
– Qamdo Prefecture	586,152	563,831	96.2%	19,673	3.4%	2,648	0.5%
– Shannan Prefecture	318,106	305,709	96.1%	10,968	3.4%	1,429	0.4%
– Xigazê Prefecture	634,962	618,270	97.4%	12,500	2.0%	4,192	0.7%
– Nagqu Prefecture	366,710	357,673	97.5%	7,510	2.0%	1,527	0.4%
– Ngari Prefecture	77,253	73,111	94.6%	3,543	4.6%	599	0.8%
– Nyingchi Prefecture	158,647	121,450	76.6%	23,792	15.0%	13,405	8.4%
Qinghai Province:	4,822,963	1,086,592	22.5%	2,606,050	54.0%	1,130,321	23.4%
– Xining PLC	1,849,713	96,091	5.2%	1,375,013	74.3%	378,609	20.5%
– Haidong Prefecture	1,391,565	128,025	9.2%	783,893	56.3%	479,647	34.5%
– Haibei AP	258,922	62,520	24.1%	94,841	36.6%	101,561	39.2%
– Huangnan AP	214,642	142,360	66.3%	16,194	7.5%	56,088	26.1%
– Hainan AP	375,426	235,663	62.8%	105,337	28.1%	34,426	9.2%
– Golog AP	137,940	126,395	91.6%	9,096	6.6%	2,449	1.8%
– Gyêgu AP	262,661	255,167	97.1%	5,970	2.3%	1,524	0.6%
– Haixi AP	332,094	40,371	12.2%	215,706	65.0%	76,017	22.9%
Tibetan areas in Sichuan province
– Ngawa AP	847,468	455,238	53.7%	209,270	24.7%	182,960	21.6%
– Garzê AP	897,239	703,168	78.4%	163,648	18.2%	30,423	3.4%
– Muli AC	124,462	60,679	48.8%	27,199	21.9%	36,584	29.4%
Tibetan areas in Yunnan province
– Dêqên AP	353,518	117,099	33.1%	57,928	16.4%	178,491	50.5%
Tibetan areas in Gansu province
– Gannan AP	640,106	329,278	51.4%	267,260	41.8%	43,568	6.8%
– Tianzhu AC	221,347	66,125	29.9%	139,190	62.9%	16,032	7.2%
Total for Greater Tibet:
With Xining and Haidong	10,523,432	5,245,347	49.8%	3,629,115	34.5%	1,648,970	15.7%
Without Xining and Haidong	7,282,154	5,021,231	69.0%	1,470,209	20.2%	790,714	10.9%

This table includes all Tibetan autonomous entities in the People's Republic of China, plus Xining PLC and Haidong P. The latter two are included to complete the figures for Qinghai province, and also because they are claimed as parts of Greater Tibet by the Government of Tibet in exile.

P = Prefecture; AP = Autonomous prefecture; PLC = Prefecture-level city; AC = Autonomous county.

Excludes members of the People's Liberation Army in active service.

Han settlers in the cities have steadily increased since then. But a preliminary analysis of the 2005 mini-census shows only a modest increase in Han population in the TAR from 2000 to 2005 and little change in eastern Tibet.

== See also ==
- Annexation of Tibet by the People's Republic of China
- Mass killings under communist regimes
- Protests and uprisings in Tibet since 1950
- Self-immolation protests by Tibetans in China
- Sinicization of Tibet
- Tibet (1912–1951)
- Tibet under Qing rule
- Tibetan diaspora
- Tibetan sovereignty debate
