= Phurbu Tsering Rinpoche =

Phurbu Tsering Rinpoche is a Tibetan abbot. Arrested by Chinese authority, he is the first senior Buddhist leader to face serious charges linked to the demonstrations in 2008.
