= Memorandum on Genuine Autonomy =

Tibet and China governing arrangements

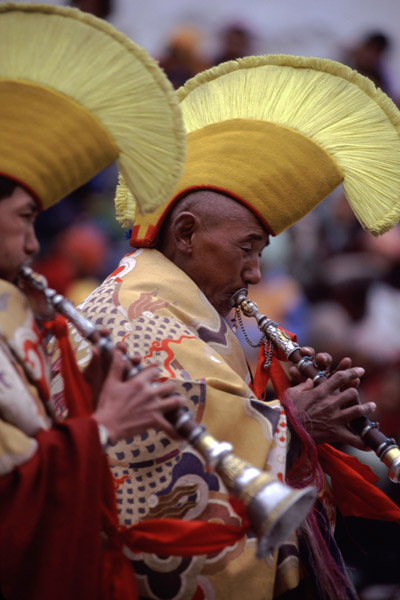
Tibetan musicians in traditional attire

The Memorandum on Genuine Autonomy for the Tibetan People provides a framework for the governance of Tibet within the People's Republic of China (PRC). In 2008 a group led by the Dalai Lama presented the memorandum to China. Beijing invited Dalai Lama's delegation to talk about his middle path, which promoted autonomy rather than full independence. Beijing rejected the proposal vehemently, claiming that it was as good as giving independence to Tibet. Following the presentation of the Memorandum, talks between China and Dalai Lama's envoys that had started in 2002 broke down. The last communication was in January 2010.

== Background ==
One of the first descriptions of the proposal by the Dalai Lama was in Strasbourg in 1988 at the European Parliament. In 1996, in London, he again talked about the concept. The following year saw the Tibetan Government-in-Exile adopting the proposal. In 2006 the TGIE came out with an updated version. However, the 2008 memorandum went further than all these version in terms of the autonomy it was seeking.

Talks between China and Tibetans around the world, led by Dalai Lama, began in 2002. In 2008, China accepted talks as a form of damage control in response to protests in Tibet that took place shortly before the 2008 Summer Olympics in Beijing. During the seventh round on 1 and 2 July 2008, China asked the Tibetan delegation for an explanation with respect to "genuine autonomy". The Tibetan delegation presented the Memorandum on Genuine Autonomy on 4 and 5 November 2008 during the eighth round of talks.

== Memorandum ==
The memorandum stated that the autonomy sought as per the Middle Way Approach was within the framework of the People's Republic of China (PRC), even if it meant some adjustments to legislation were required. It noted that Tibetans were already one of China's 55 ethnic minorities and without directly mentioning "Greater Tibet", the memorandum implied it when talking about "integrity of the Tibetan nationality". Cultural autonomy, a preservation of Tibetan heritage and identity, should go hand in hand with China's larger economic and scientific development.

The memorandum went on to discuss the "basic needs to Tibetans" that would be the eleven "subject matters of self-government" or policy areas — "language, culture, religion, education, environment protection, utilisation of natural resources, economic development and trade, public health, public security", regulation of immigration and emigration, and cultural, educational and religious exchanges with other countries. These points were backed up with provisions from the Constitution of China and Law on Regional National Autonomy. For example, Article 4 of the constitution, which guarantees "the freedom of all nationalities to use and develop their own spoken and written languages", was referred to for linguistic autonomy. For environmental management, the memorandum sought more than what was present within the existing powers given to regional administrations in China. In essence what was sought was true decision making powers.

== Aftermath ==
A Chinese official stated that the memorandum was problematic in many ways, including the creation of contradictions with the Constitution. The Chinese official Zhu Weiqun stated at a press conference that the Dalai Lama was not a representative of the entire Tibetan community and that the only reason for the talks were to allow the Dalai Lama a platform to give up his separatist tendencies.

The Tibetan delegation released the Memorandum to the public on 16 November 2008. A meeting called by the Dalai Lama took place in Dharamshala from 17 and 22 November 2008. The meeting among Tibetan exiles showed support for the Dalai Lama rather than the Middle Way Approach.
