= Parole =

Conditional release of a prisoner

Parole, also known as provisional release, supervised release, or being on paper, is a form of early release of a prison inmate where the prisoner agrees to abide by behavioral conditions, including checking in with their designated parole officers, or else they may be rearrested and returned to prison. Parole is not an additional sentence; rather it is a system that allows inmates to finish their original sentence outside of prison under supervision. In some jurisdictions in the United States, people may shorten their time on parole through earned compliance credits.

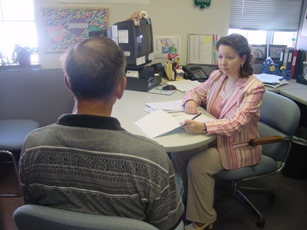
A parole officer with the Missouri Department of Corrections interviews a drug-related offense probationer.

Originating from the French word parole ('speech, spoken words' but also 'promise'), the term became associated during the Middle Ages with the release of prisoners who gave their word. This differs greatly from pardon, amnesty or commutation of sentence in that parolees are still considered to be serving their sentences, and may be returned to prison if they violate the conditions of their parole. It is similar to probation, the key difference being that parole is served for the remainder of a prison sentence, while probation can be granted in place of a prison sentence.

== History ==
The practice of paroling enemy troops began thousands of years ago, at least as early as the time of Carthage. Parole allowed the prisoners' captors to avoid the burdens of having to feed and care for them while still avoiding having the prisoners rejoin their old ranks once released; it could also allow the captors to recover their own men in a prisoner exchange. Hugo Grotius, an early international lawyer, favorably discussed prisoner of war parole. During the American Civil War, both the Dix–Hill Cartel and the Lieber Code set out rules regarding prisoner of war parole. Francis Lieber's thoughts on parole later reappeared in the Declaration of Brussels of 1874, the Hague Convention, and the Geneva Convention Relative to the Treatment of Prisoners of War.

Alexander Maconochie, a Scottish geographer and captain in the Royal Navy, introduced the modern idea of parole when, in 1840, he was appointed superintendent of the British penal colonies in Norfolk Island, Australia. He developed a plan to prepare them for eventual return to society that involved three grades. The first two consisted of promotions earned through good behaviour, labour, and study. The third grade in the system involved conditional liberty outside of prison while obeying rules. A violation would return them to prison and they would start all over again through the ranks of the three-grade process. He reformed its ticket of leave system, instituting what many consider to be the world's first parole system. Prisoners served indeterminate sentences from which they could be released early if they showed evidence of rehabilitation through participation in a graded classification system based on a unit of exchange called a mark. Prisoners earned marks through good behavior, lost them through bad behavior, and could spend them on passage to higher classification statuses ultimately conveying freedom. Maconochie influenced the development of modern parole systems used in the United States, which is reflected in similar ideas in the late 19th and early 20th centuries.

In an instance of multiple discovery, in 1846, Arnould Bonneville de Marsangy proposed the idea of parole (which he termed "preparatory liberations") to the Civil Tribunal at Reims.

== By country ==
=== Canada ===
In general, in Canada, prisoners are eligible to apply for full parole after serving one-third of their sentences. Prisoners are also eligible to apply for day parole, and can do this before being eligible to apply for full parole.

Any prisoner whose sentence is less than two years is sent to a correctional facility in the province or territory where they were convicted, whilst anyone sentenced to serve no less than two years will be sent to a federal correctional facility and will thus have to deal with the Parole Board of Canada.

Parole is an option for most prisoners. However, parole is not guaranteed, particularly for prisoners serving life or indeterminate sentences. In cases of first-degree murder, one can apply for parole after 25 years if convicted of a single murder. However, if convicted of multiple murders, either of the first or second-degree, the sentencing judge previously had the discretion to make parole ineligibility periods consecutive – thereby extending parole ineligibility beyond 25 years and, in rare cases, beyond a normal life-span. On May 27, 2022, the Supreme Court of Canada unanimously ruled that extending parole ineligibility beyond one's foreseeable lifespan was unconstitutional for being "cruel and unusual" punishment.

=== China ===
In China, prisoners are often granted medical parole or compassionate release, which releases them on the grounds that they must receive medical treatment which cannot be provided for in prison. Occasionally, medical parole is used as a less public way of releasing a wrongly convicted prisoner.

The Chinese legal code has no explicit provision for exile, but often dissidents are released on the grounds that they need to be treated for a medical condition in another country, and with the understanding that they will be reincarcerated if they return to China. Dissidents who have been released on medical parole include Ngawang Chophel, Ngawang Sangdrol, Phuntsog Nyidron, Takna Jigme Zangpo, Wang Dan, Wei Jingsheng, Gao Zhan and Fang Lizhi.

=== Israel ===
Until 2001, parole in Israel was possible only after the prisoner had served two thirds of their sentence. On 13 February 2001, the Knesset passed a bill, brought forward by Reuven Rivlin and David Libai, which allowed the early release of prisoners who had served half of their prison term (the so-called "Deri Law"). The law was originally intended to help ease overcrowding in prisons. This rule only applies to Israeli citizens. Palestinians and other persons living under military law can be held in detention indefinitely with no right to parole.

=== Italy ===
Libertà condizionata is covered by Article 176 of the Italian Penal Code. A prisoner is eligible if he has served at least 30 months (or 26 years for life sentences), and the time remaining on his sentence is less than half the total (normally), a quarter of the total (if previously convicted or never convicted) or five years (for sentences greater than 7.5 years). In 2006, 21 inmates were granted libertà condizionata.

=== New Zealand ===
In New Zealand, inmates serving a short sentence (up to two years) are automatically released after serving half their sentence, without a parole hearing. Inmates serving sentences of more than two years are normally seen by the New Zealand Parole Board after serving one-third of the sentence, although the judge at sentencing can make an order for a minimum non-parole period of up to two-thirds of the sentence. Inmates serving life sentences usually serve a minimum of 10 years, or longer depending on the minimum non-parole period, before being eligible for parole. Parole is not an automatic right and it was declined in 71 percent of hearings in the year ending 30 June 2010. Life imprisonment without the possibility of parole has been given only once, to Brenton Tarrant for the 2019 Christchurch mosque shootings.

=== United Kingdom ===
The Parole Boards in the UK are only involved in the release of prisoners with specific sentences. Indeterminate sentences (life imprisonment and imprisonment for public protection) are always handled by the Parole Board because they have no fixed release date. Some determinate or "fixed" sentences, such as extended determinate sentences, are also handled by the Parole Board, but for the majority of prisoners the Parole Board will not be involved in their release.

The conditions of release are called a licence, and parole is called release on licence. There are seven standard licence conditions for all prisoners:

1. Be of good behaviour and not behave in a way which undermines the purpose of the licence period;
2. Not commit any offence;
3. Keep in touch with the supervising officer in accordance with instructions given by the supervising officer;
4. Receive visits from the supervising officer in accordance with instructions given by the supervising officer;
5. Reside permanently at an address approved by the supervising officer and obtain the prior permission of the supervising officer for any stay of one or more nights at a different address;
6. Not undertake work, or a particular type of work, unless it is approved by the supervising officer and notify the supervising officer in advance of any proposal to undertake work or a particular type of work;
7. Not travel outside the United Kingdom, the Channel Islands or the Isle of Man, except with the prior permission of the supervising officer or for the purposes of immigration deportation or removal.

When a prisoner does not have to have their release approved by the Parole Board, further "additional licence conditions" may be suggested by the Probation Service and set by prison governors. When the Parole Board is involved, the Probation Service may suggest additional conditions, but the Parole Board is responsible for determining which additional conditions will be added to the licence. If an offender breaks any of these conditions, they can be "recalled" or returned to prison. Data reported by the Justice Secretary Shabana Mahmood in May 2025 showed that recall numbers have grown significantly in recent years. The figures she quoted showed that:

- In 1993, 100 paroled prisoners were recalled to prison
- In 2018, 6000 prisoners were recalled
- In the year to March 2025, 13,600 prisoners were recalled.

From 2014 many of the probation and license monitoring functions were outsourced to private-sector "community rehabilitation companies" (CRCs) as well as the National Probation Service. In May 2019 the government announced that supervision of offenders, including supervision of offenders released on licence, would be re-nationalised. The decision was made following multiple criticisms of the system which led Chief probation inspector Dame Glenys Stacey to describe the system as "irredeemably flawed".

=== United States ===
==== Early history ====
Penologist Zebulon Brockway introduced parole when he became superintendent of Elmira Reformatory in Elmira, New York. To manage prison populations and rehabilitate those incarcerated, he instituted a two-part strategy that consisted of indeterminate sentences and parole releases. This was significant in prison reform due to its implication that prisoners began their rehabilitation during incarceration, which would be recognizable by a parole board. It also provided newfound emphasis on prisoners' protection from cruel and unusual punishment. Brockway's model became the foundation for the U.S. parole system, with heavy influence on adoption of parole boards, indeterminate sentencing, and the later switch to the new penology.

==== Modern history ====
In some jurisdictions in the United States, courts may specify in a sentence how much time must be served before a prisoner is eligible for parole. This is often done by specifying an indeterminate sentence such as "5 to 15 years", or "15 years to life". Indeterminate sentencing grew from the belief that the length of prison sentences should be based on rehabilitation and institutional behavior. The latter type is known as an indeterminate life sentence; in contrast, a sentence of "life without the possibility of parole" is known as a determinate life sentence. Eligibility rules vary by state, with some jurisdictions favoring indeterminate sentencing while others use determinate sentencing structures that limit chances for parole.

On the federal level, Congress abolished parole in the Comprehensive Crime Control Act of 1984 (Pub. L. No. 98-473 § 218(a)(5), 98 Stat. 1837, 2027 [repealing 18 U.S.C.A. § 4201 et seq.]). Federal prisoners may, however, earn a maximum of 54 days of good time credit per year against their sentence (18 U.S.C.A. § 3624(b)). Although federal parole was abolished, the number of individuals under federal community supervision has remained high. At the time of sentencing, the federal judge may also specify a post-imprisonment period of supervised release. The U.S. Parole Commission still has jurisdiction over parole for those prisoners convicted of felonies in the District of Columbia and who are serving their sentences there, as well as over certain federally incarcerated military and international prisoners.

In most states, the decision of whether an inmate is paroled is vested in a paroling authority such as a parole board. Mere good conduct while incarcerated in and of itself does not necessarily guarantee that an inmate will be paroled. Other factors may enter into the decision to grant or deny parole, most commonly the establishment of a permanent residence and immediate, gainful employment or some other clearly visible means of self-support upon release (such as Social Security if the prisoner is old enough to qualify). Depending upon the jurisdiction, the parole board may look at various factors such as the inmate's criminal history, participation in rehabilitation, education, or vocational programs, expressions of remorse, admissions of guilt, and insight (in the psychiatric sense) into the factors driving the inmate's decision to commit the crimes at issue (in order to estimate the likelihood that the inmate may reoffend upon encountering similar factors in the outside world after release). Research shows that evaluations of remorse can be subjective and is inconsistently applied across cases. Modern parole boards also rely on actuarial risk-assessment instruments, which estimates the likelihood of reoffending. Even with strong institutional behavior, parole is up to the board's discretion in most states and is not guaranteed. Many states now permit sentences of life imprisonment without the possibility of parole (such as for murder and espionage), but any prisoner not sentenced to such sentences or the death penalty will eventually have the right to petition for release (one state – Alaska – maintains neither the death penalty nor life imprisonment without parole as sentencing options).

Before being granted the privilege of parole, the inmate meets with members of the parole board and is interviewed. The parolee also has a psychological examination. If parole is granted, the inmate must first agree to abide by the conditions of parole set by the paroling authority. While in prison, the inmate signs a parole certificate or contract. On this contract are the conditions that the inmate must follow. These conditions usually require the parolee to meet regularly with their parole officer or community corrections agent, who assesses the behavior and adjustment of the parolee and determines whether the parolee is violating any of their terms of release (typically these include being at home during certain hours which is called a curfew, maintaining steady employment, not absconding, refraining from illicit drug use and, sometimes, abstaining from alcohol, attending addiction treatment or counseling, and having no contact with their victim).Violations of these supervision rules, referred to as technical violations, are not criminal offenses, but they can still be punishable with re-incarceration. Since a technical violation is not a new criminal offense; only violations involving new crimes are considered for recidivism rates. Parole conditions differ substantially across states, due to differences in correctional policies and supervision practices. The inmate gives an address which is verified by parole officers as valid before the inmate is released to parole supervision.

Upon release, the parolee goes to a parole office and is assigned a parole officer. Parole officers make unannounced visits to parolees' houses or apartments to check on them. During these home visits officers look for signs of drug or alcohol use, guns or illegal weapons, and other illegal activities. Should parolees start to use drugs or alcohol, they are told to go to drug or alcohol counseling and Narcotics Anonymous or Alcoholics Anonymous meetings. Should they not comply with conditions on the parole certificate (including abstention from voting) a warrant is issued for their arrest. While voting is not a violation of parole, some parolees may have this right taken away due to their conviction level, independent of their parole status. Their parole time is stopped when the warrant is issued and starts only after they are arrested. They have a parole violation hearing within a specified time, and then a decision is made by the parole board to revoke their parole or continue the parolee on parole. In some cases, a parolee may be discharged from parole before the time called for in the original sentence if it is determined that the parole restrictions are no longer necessary for the protection of society (this most frequently occurs when elderly parolees are involved).

Service members who commit crimes while in the U.S. military may be subject to court martial proceedings under the Uniform Code of Military Justice (UCMJ). If found guilty, they may be sent to federal or military prisons and upon release may be supervised by U.S. Federal Probation officers.

Parole in the United States has proven to be politically divisive. Beginning from the initiation of the war on drugs in the 1970s, politicians began to advertise their "tough on crime" stances, encouraging a tightening of penal policy and resulting in longer sentences for what were previously referred to as minor drug violations. During elections, politicians whose administrations parole any large number of prisoners (or, perhaps, one notorious criminal) are typically attacked by their opponents as being "soft on crime". According to the U.S. Department of Justice, at least sixteen states have removed discretionary parole for most new felony convictions, and four more have abolished parole for certain violent offenders. However, during the rise of mass incarceration in the 1970s, the states that continued to use parole and indeterminate sentencing contributed more to rising incarceration rates than those without parole boards. Said states implemented a dramatic decrease of parole releases, which inevitably resulted in longer sentences for more prisoners. From 1980 to 2009, indeterminate sentencing states made up nine of the ten states with the highest incarceration rate.

In many states, incarceration increased not only because parole existed, but because parole boards reduced release rates beginning in the 1980s. Research has shown that even in states retaining parole, a significant portion of prison admissions are the result of technical violations rather than new criminal offenses. Starting in the 1980s, parole was revisited as a method once again to manage prison populations and as financial motivation to prevent further budget straining. The new approach to parole release was accompanied with the growth of a mass surveillance state. The supervision practices of increased drug testing, intensive supervision, unannounced visits and home confinement are widely used today. Additionally, a growing condition of parole was to assume the role of informant towards frequently surveilled communities. By 2020, parole populations increased in several states due to overcrowding and emergency responses to the COVID-19 pandemic.

The Great Recession of 2008 coupled with the Twin Towers attack on September 11, 2001, contributed to the public emphasis on the war on terror and eventually led to a trend of lowering incarceration. In fact, presidential politics between 2001 and 2012 were, for the first time in ten years, not focused on domestic crime control and even saw the promotion of the Second Chance Act by George W. Bush, who used the act to pledge federal money for reentry as a symbol of his "compassionate conservatism". Soon after, states began incorporating evidence-based reforms focused on reducing unnecessary supervision and revocation of parole privileges.

==== Debates and reform efforts ====
Since the 1990s, parole and indeterminate sentencing have been the focus of debate in the United States with some emphasizing reform of the parole system and others calling for its abolishment altogether. These debates began to take face during the a period of time in which the goal of rehabilitation was declining causing parole boards to rely on an individuals risk-level rather than ability to reform. These debates are fueled by a growing scholarship that criticizes U.S. parole boards and also the parole system more broadly. Debates also escalated as research showed that restrictive parole policies and high rates of technical violations contributed to the incline of U.S. incarceration rates.

Parole boards are seen as lacking in efficient qualifications and too politicized in the appointment process. The decision for granting parole has been criticized for neglecting the due process of prisoners on a case-by-case basis. Additionally, the process for being granted a commutation has been criticized, as many prisoners have been denied a commutation for not showing the right amount of "remorse" or proving substantially that they were ready to contribute again, which are aspects that many argue are too normative and subjective.

Most agree that, as was originally intended, the parole system puts a necessary focus on rehabilitation, despite its current problems which are widely debated. However, critics have noted that high rates of re-incarceration due to technical violations, violations of parole conditions that are not criminal offenses, undermine the rehabilitative goals of parole. Critics note that it is becoming more and more expensive to the taxpayer, with little evidence of successful rehabilitation for prisoners. The conditions of parole themselves are often attacked as well, critiqued for being overwhelmingly criminogenic and perpetuating mass surveillance and a permanent state of imprisonment that does little to ensure a smooth reentry into society. Critics note that greater discretion is required to decide which parolees require costly supervisory resources and which ones do not, rather than placing digital, physical, and structural restrictions on every parolee. Evidence regarding the effects of surveillance on parolees recommend adjusting supervision levels to risk-level, rather than equally intense surveillance on all parolees.

The U.S. Department of Justice (DOJ) stated in 2005 that about 45% of parolees completed their sentences successfully, while 38% were returned to prison, and 11% absconded. These statistics, the DOJ says, are relatively unchanged since 1995; even so, some states (including New York) have abolished parole altogether for violent felons, and the federal government abolished it in 1984 for all offenders convicted of a federal crime, whether violent or not. Despite the decline in jurisdictions with a functioning parole system, the average annual growth of parolees was an increase of about 1.6% per year between 1995 and 2002.

A variant of parole is known as "time off for good behavior", or, colloquially, "good time". Unlike the traditional form of parole – which may be granted or denied at the discretion of a parole board – time off for good behavior is automatic absent a certain number (or gravity) of infractions committed by a convict while incarcerated (in most jurisdictions the released inmate is placed under the supervision of a parole officer for a certain amount of time after being so released). Good time credit reduces the length of a prison sentence, but does not replace parole. Individuals released early through good time can still be placed under parole or other forms of community supervision. Good time credits are often granted for participation in work, education, or other programs offered while incarcerated. In some cases "good time" can reduce the original sentence by as much as one-half. It is usually not made available to inmates serving life sentences, as there is no release date that can be moved up. In 2020, many states increased the use of good time and emergency credits to reduce prison populations during the COVID-19 pandemic due to the overcrowding crisis at the time.

==== Difference from mandatory supervision ====
Some states in the United States have what is known as "mandatory supervision", whereby an inmate is released before the completion of their sentence due to legal technicalities which oblige the offender justice system to free them. In the federal prison system, and in some states such as Texas, inmates are compensated with "good time", which is counted towards time served. For example, if an inmate served five years of a ten-year prison term, and also had five years of "good time", they will have completed their sentence "on paper", obliging the state to release them unless deemed a threat to society in writing by the parole board. Mandatory supervision is different from parole in that it is not based on a board's discretion, but instead is legally required once an incarcerated individual's sentence is served. Where parole is granted or denied at the discretion of a parole board, mandatory supervision does not involve a decision-making process: one either qualifies for it or does not. Mandatory supervision tends to involve stipulations that are more lenient than those of parole, and in some cases place no obligations at all on the individual being released.

==== Racial disparities ====
Evidence shows that within the U.S. parole system there are multiple points of racial disparities involving parole eligibility, decisions regarding release and the loss of parole privileges. The disparities in the system are the results of the racial history in the United States that has led to increased supervision amongst certain racial groups.

Consistent data across the states shows that a larger percentage of Black Americans are under parole than White Americans. Between 2001 and 2018, disparities between Black and White Americans in the parole system continued with minimal trends of improvement.

It has also been noted that the criteria parole boards use for release decisions such as ‘remorse’ or ‘insight’ is negatively biased towards people of color. The practice of using actuarial risk for release decisions has been widely debated due to its incorporation of criminal history, neighborhood characteristics, financial status; all categories that statistically put Black and Latino communities at a disadvantage.

==== Immigration ====
In US immigration law, the term parole has two meanings related to allowing persons to enter or leave the United States without the normally required documentation.

==== Prisoners of war ====
The US Department of Defense defines parole as: "Parole agreements are promises given the captor by a POW to fulfill stated conditions, such as not to bear arms or not to escape, in consideration of special privileges, such as release from captivity or lessened restraint."

Parole of prisoners of war is "the agreement of persons who have been taken prisoner by an enemy that they will not again take up arms against those who captured them, either for a limited time or during the continuance of the war."

In the United States, current policy prohibits US military personnel who are prisoners of war from accepting parole. The Code of the United States Fighting Force states: "I will accept neither parole nor special favors from the enemy." The position is reiterated by the Department of Defense. "The United States does not authorize any Military Service member to sign or enter into any such parole agreement."

== Outcomes ==
According to a review by Jennifer Doleac, reductions in parole supervision was one of the most cost-effective ways to improve the rehabilitation of prisoners.

Crime statistics show a large percentage of ex-convicts commit crimes after being released from prison (recidivism).

== See also ==
- Crime prevention
- Law and order (politics)
- Mandatory sentencing
- Parol evidence rule
- Rehabilitation policy
- Release on temporary licence
- Ticket of leave
