= Pawan Karan =

Indian writer

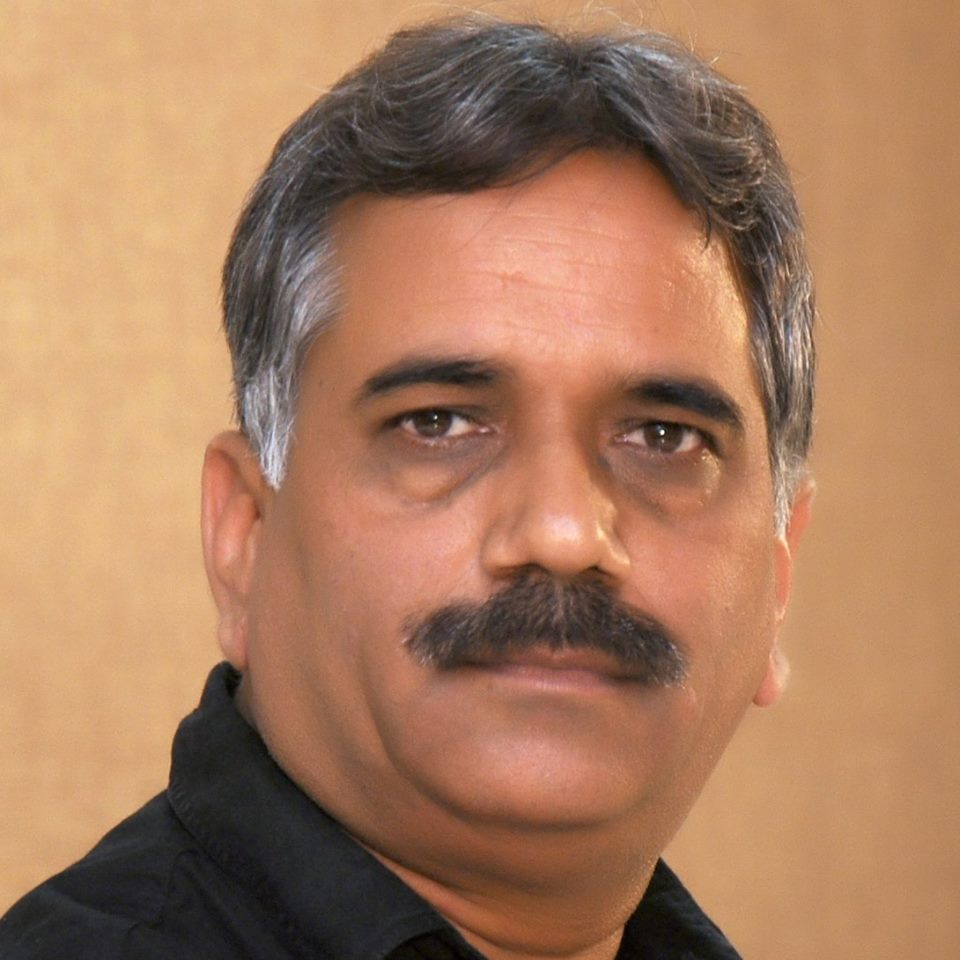
- Born: 18 June 1964 (age 62); Gwalior, Madhya Pradesh, India
- Education: PhD (Indian Literature)
- Alma mater: Jiwaji University
- Occupations: Poet, editor, social & political analyst
- Era: Early 21st Century
- Awards: Ram Vilas Sharma Samman, Raza Samman, Vaagishwari Samman, Pushskin Samman, Sheela Siddhantkar Samman, Rituraj Samman, Kedar Samman, Spandan Samman

Pawan Karan (born 18 June 1964) is an Indian poet, columnist, editor, social and political analyst and “one of the major poets of early 21st century”.He is highly regarded for his realistic depiction of women's life in Indian society. Apart that his poems written against subjects like imperialism, capitalism, religion fanatics, social beliefs of caste based society and orthodox customs are highly appreciated as well, because of them he constantly becomes a target of religious fanatics, orthodox social view and politics and long-established norms of Indian society.

== Major works ==
Pawan Karan's writing career started around 1980, when his poem is published in a local newspaper. This started a fire in him about poetry, after that, he began writing poetry, thinking about poetry, and eventually living in poetry but his poems took 10 long years to be approved by the Indian poet society. His poems started publishing in the leading newspapers and magazines around 1992. Critics and readers started reading his poems seriously. Karan doesn't have a political understanding at the time, so 1992 introduced him to emergent writing and progressive movement. After that major publication houses of India i.e. 'Raj Kamal Prakashan' and 'Vani Prakashan' published his books and Karan is in their author profiles as a visionary poet.

Born in the Heart of India, Karan worked as government employee, editor (literature) in the leading Indian newspapers ‘Nav bharat’ and ‘Nai Duniya’ and wrote a column “Shabd Prasang” in ‘Nai Duniya’ and a regular columnist in "Khabar HarPal". Many of his poems have been translated in various languages like English, Russian, Nepali, Tamil, Telugu, Kannada, Oriya, Gujarati, Assamese, Bengali, and Urdu.

Karan gradually moved away from the religious and social beliefs of his contemporaries, formulating and expressing the philosophy of feminism in his ground breaking work “Stree Mere Bheetar” in 2004.There are very few writers in India, who wrote on the situation of women's in Indian Society. How Indian women's are suffering in the society, by the hands of Men. Condition of women is desolate and distraught, just living under the shadow of man. Karan's poetry shows not only the plight of Indian women but of the women in Asia and Africa (the third world) as well. His poetry successfully tells us about the half world (aka second sex) is not independent anywhere. They are bound by law not of government but of men. Poems written on women's by Karan can indisputably become a part of World women's poetry. Karan is very well respected among the intellectual, and his work has greatly influenced the thinkers, writers and poets of his generation.

=== Iss Tarah Main ===
Pawan Karan's first poetry volume was published in the year 2000, which was appreciated by readers and critics as well. Leading poems in this volume mainly based on family, love, nature and objects, incidents, episodes and visuals. Many poems of this volume made permanent vicinity in readers mind like Bharosa (Trust), Pita ka Makan (Father's House), Tapedik (Tuberculosis), Dollor, Gullak (Cash Box), Budhi Beriya (Old Berries), Dehari (Threshold), Aamrud (Guava), Shangrahalay (Museum), Louis Braille. From these Bharosa (Trust) has been published in wedding cards and posters on a regular basis. This volume awarded “Raza Samman” from ‘Madhya Pradesh Art Association’ which is given in the memory of world-famous painter "S. H. Raza" and “Ram Vilas Sharma Samman” from ‘Madhya Pradesh Sahitya Academy’.

=== Stree Mere Bheetar ===
Pawan Karan’s second poetry volume “Stree Mere Bheetar” (aka Woman inside Me), published in 2004. This volume stunned critics and readers instead of, poems in this volume based on women’s subject already published in various newspapers and magazines before coming out as a whole, and readers were quite amazed by the poems and astounded by the volume. His poetry becomes a topic for debate between readers and reviewers. Some notable critics were already said in their speeches and wrote about the poems before this volume even published. When all the poems come as a book in front of readers, they all accepted it prominently.

After this volume was published one of the foremost critic in India said, “Poems in this volume will change the course of Indian Poetry”. All the poems in this volume are concerned with women, this volume was Karan's first entirely women oriented volume. Poems in this volume were impactful because of their new style, focusing on thought and chiefly emotions. Poems like Pyar Main Dubi Hui Maa (A Mother Submerged in Love), Ek Khubsurat Beti Ka Pitah (Father of a Beautiful Daughter), Tum Jaisi Chahte Ho Waisi Nhi Hu Main (I’m not as you like me to be), Hume Ek Aisi Bahu Chahye (We want a suitable bride like that), Behan ka Premee (Sister’s Lover), Stree Subhodhini (Women for Marriage), Purash (Man), Stan (Breast) were praised for this change.

This volume has been translated and published in different languages like – Malayalam, Marathi, Oriya, Urdu, Punjabi and Bengali. This volume has been interpreted into a play and this play has been staged by Trikarshi group and is scheduled to be play at different centers time to time. A hundred poems from this volume with other poems focus on women becomes a poster portrayal in an exhibition by the state government. This volume is not only a best seller in Indian (Hindi) literature but also accepted as a volume which always remains popular between the readers because of its adequate poems.

Stree Mere Bheetar has received numerous awards like – Vaagishwari Samman (2004), Pushskin Samman, Moscow (2006), Sheela Siddhantkar Samman (2007), Parampara Rituraj Samman (2009). The Marathi translation of this collection, “Stree Majhya Aat” has been included in the syllabus of Mahatma Gandhi University, Kottayam and ‘Nanded University, Maharastra’ and got an interpreter award ‘Anuvaad Puruskar’ of Gandhi Smarak Nidhi, Nagpur.

=== Aspatal Ke Bahar Telephone ===
Pawan Karan's third poetry volume “Aspatal ke bahar Telephone” (aka A Telephone outside Hospital) was published in the year 2009. This volume has been recognized very differently from Karan's earlier published volumes ‘Iss Tarah Main’ and ‘Stree Mere Bheetar’. In this volume Karan's deep knowledge about family and society comes out although some of the poems in this volume were women oriented however this volume has presented society so easily that it fills readers with notion and perception. Unique style of poems made a special place between readers. Some poems made their place in readers and critics speeches. Readers got to read poems like Udhari Lal, Alabama, Ristedar (Relatives), Mantri (Misnter), Pahalwan (Wrestler), General Dyer or Main (Me and Gen. Dyer), Ye Rasta Jaha Pahucahta Hai (Wherever this way Leads), Hindu (Indian), Trianga (Indian ‘Tricolor’ Flag), Dulhe Ke Dost (Groom's Friends) which was against communalism. This volume has been awarded the eminent Indian poetry award“Kedar Samman”, 2012.

=== Kehna Nahi Aata ===
Pawan Karan's fourth volume “Kehna Nahi Aata” (aka How to Say!) was published in 2012. This volume contains the poems against various subjects i.e. imperialism, capitalism, traditional, orthodox and religious fanatics. Karan's resistance has been shown in his last three volumes but not at this level, in this volume it got intensified. In this volume we see poems which support lowest and destitute of the society. This volume shows us Indian society is full of religious fanatics, casters, and people who practice untouchability, also the exploitation done to the lower class by upper class of the society.

Kehna Nhi Aata, title poem of this volume has been included in the curriculum of higher secondary education for student to read as a chief poem in Hindi syllabus of Kerala State, India.Many poems in this volume repeatedly come in converse like Aarakshan Gali Aati Sakri Hai (Reservation lane is narrow), Jhooth (Lie/Fib), Nabbe Lakh (Nine Million Times), Garib Desh (A Poor Country), Expression, Uss Photographer Ka Naam Pata Kro (Procure the Name of that Photographer), Pithe (Backs), Walking the Plank, and Turkana Boy. Some women focus poems also concluded this volume like Vishpala, Surya Savitri, Bhai (Brother), Swara, Main Stree Hona Chahta Hu (I want to become a woman).

=== Coat Ke Baju Par Button ===
Pawan Karan's fifth published volume was “Koat Ke Baju Par Batan” (aka Button on Coat's Sleeve) in 2013. Poems of this volume represent Karan's intellectual growth, strong opinions. In this volume Karan beautifully described his thought in brief poems instead off detailed ones. After reading these poems readers find that Karan is trying to give a new style to his poetry, poems like Swapan (Dream), Bhulna (Forgot), Koat Ke Baju Par Batan (Button on Coat's Sleeve), Runggye Adak, Narisa Chakrabongse, Qu Yuan, Sonagachi, Baat (Converse), Aastha (Devotion), Bazar (Market), and Sewer Line.

Readers enjoyed the versatility of poems in this volume i.e. Gay Humari Mata Hai (Cow, Our Mother), America Ka Rashtrapati Hone Ke Maje (Pleasure of being an American President), Pradhan-mantri Ke Commando (Prime Minister's Commando), and Naach (Dance). Some poems of this volume fill readers from the feeling of known-unknown i.e. Photo Session, Wah Ab Mujhese Bhi Darne Lagi Hai (She started fearing me as well), Apne Vivah Ki Tayari Karti Premika (Lover started preparing for her Wedding), Uss Bhale Aadmi Ke Pass Main ApnaSamay Chhod Aayi Hu (I’ve left my time to a Gentleman).

=== Stree Shatak ===
Stree Shatak is a two-volume poetry collection, published in 2019. Comprising one hundred poems, the work draws upon women from Indian mythology, the epics, Puranic literature, history and collective social memory. Through dramatic monologues and narrative poems, the voice of both celebrated and lesser-known female figures is reconstructed, examining patriarchal traditions from the perspective of women and foregrounding their experience, desires, grievances and act of resistance. The collection features poems on Tara, Manthara, Urvashi and Sudheshana.

== Honors and awards ==
- Ram Vilas Sharma Samman (2000) given by Madhya Pradesh Sathiya Parishad.
- Raza Samman (2002) given by Madhya Pradesh Kala Parishad.
- Vaagishwari Samman (2004) given by Madhya Pradesh Hindi Sathiya Sammelan.
- Pushskin Samman, Moscow (2006), given in memory of Alexander Pushkin by Bharat Mitra Samaj, Moscow.
- Sheila Siddhantkar Samman (2007), given in memory of Sheila Siddhantkar (Poet).
- Rituraj Samman (2009), given by literary society New Delhi
- Kedar Samman (2012), given in memory of Kedarnath Agarwal
- Spandan Samman (2017), given by Spandan Sanstha, Bhopal.

== Selected works ==
=== Poetry collection ===
==== Iss Tarah Main (2000) ====
- Isse Pehle Ki Wo
- Aamrudh (Guava)
- Neem (Lilac)
- Bharosa (Assurance)
- Sandesh (Letter)
- Bail-gadi (Bullock Cart)
- Boodhi Bariyaan (Old Berries)
- Ek Chitthi Likhni Hai Mujhe
- Chatton Se
- Nazarbattu
- Do Din (Two Days)
- Pita Ka Makan (Father's House)
- Kainchi (Scissor)
- Tala (Padlock)
- Unneis sau Choshat (1964)
- Chulaha (Stove)
- Unn Din (Those Days)
- Bijli Ke Khambe (Electricity Poles)
- Kis Tarah Milu Tumhe
- Dehari (Threshold)
- Tapedik (Tuberculosis)
- Shranghalay (Museum).
- Anghutha (Thumb)
- Parde (Curtains)
- Dollar
- Louis Brail
- Banduke (Guns)

==== Stree Mere Bheetar (2004) ====
- Ek Khoobsurat Beti Ka Pitah (Father of a Beautiful Daughter)
- Mauseri Behne
- Sanjhi
- Behan Ka Premee (Sister's Lover)
- Main Usse Ab Bhi Prem Nhi Karta
- Hum Pati Anakarshak Patniyo Ke
- Typist
- Gullak (Cash Box)
- Kis Tarah Milu Tumhe
- Aptiyio Ke Beech Premee
- Tum Jaisi Chahte Ho Waisi Nhi Hu Main (I'm not as you like me to be)
- Yah Aawaz Mujhe Sachi Nhi Lagti
- Burka (Burkha)
- Usse Kehna Hi PadeTho
- Stan (Breast)
- Sankhya (Number)
- Sparsh Jo Kisi Aur Ko Saupna Chahthi Thi Wah
- Ek Stree Mere Bheeter
- Uski Zidd
- Darasal Usse Samjhana Khud Ko Samjhana Hai
- Pyar Main Doobi Hui Maa (A Mother Submerged in Love)
- Iss Zabran Likh Diye Gay Ko Hi
- Stree Subhodhni (Women for Marriage)
- Tum Jise Prem Kar Rhi Ho Inn Dino

==== Aspatal ke Bahar Telephone (2009) ====
- Chand Ke Bare Main
- Bazar (Market)
- Pita Ki Aankh Main Pyari Aurat
- Shreemant
- Udhari Lal
- Scooter
- Alabama
- Ristedar (Relatives)
- Chotha Khamba
- Dehati Dewaan
- Ye Rasta Jaha Pahucahta Hai (Wherever this way Leads)
- Dulhe Ke Dost (Groom's Friends)
- General Dyer or Main (Me and General Dyer)
- Hindu (Indian)
- Pita Ki Aankhe
- Sarkari Pakhana-Ghar
- Mantri (Misnter)
- Tiranga (Indian ‘Tricolor’ Flag)
- Batwara
- Aspatal ke Bahar Telephone
- Musalman Ladke

==== Kehna Nahi Aata (2012) ====
- Inhe Chao Se Padhe
- Chalies Hazarwa Kilometer (40th Thousand Kilometer)
- Mobile
- Aarakshan Gali Aati Sakri Hai (Reservation lane is narrow)
- Jhooth (Lie)
- Surya Savitri
- Chakbara
- Nabbe Lakh (Nine Million Times)
- Sawra
- Kehna
- Gareeb Desh (A Poor Country)
- Walking The Plank
- Machis (Match Box)
- Bhai (Brother)
- Hatheliyo Ka Sujhav
- Jai Shree-Ram
- Turkana Boy
- Bulb
- Pithe (Backs)
- Vishapala

==== Koat ke Baju Par Batan (2013) ====
- Naach (Dance)
- Gay Humari Mata Hai (Cow, Our Mother)
- Wah Ab Mujhese Bhi Darne Lagi Hai (She started fearing me as well)
- Swapan (Dream)
- Bhulana (Forgot)
- Chota Bhai
- Purana Makan
- Photo Session
- America Ka Rashtrapati Hone Ke Maje (Pleasure of being an American President)
- Badi Bua
- Koat Ke Baju Par Batan (Button on Coat's Sleeve)
- Agli Sadi Main
- Peshi Se Wapas Laut-te Hue Quedi
- Jisse Wah Apne Bister Ki Tarah Aai Dekhte
- Chand Tumse Haod Hai Meri
- Ladai
- Apne Vivah Ki Tayari Karti Premika (Lover started preparing for her Wedding)
- Runggye Adak
- Narisa Chakrabongse
- Uss Bhale Aadmi Ke Pass Main Apna Samay Chhod Aayi Hu (I’ve left my time to a Gentleman).
- Sonagachi
- Qu Yuan
- Main Jananti Hu Wah Muhse Kya Janana Chahta Hai
- Baat (Converse)
- Aastha (Devotion)
- Sewer Line
- Pradhan-mantri Ke Commando (Prime Minister's Commando)

== See also ==
- List of Indian poets
- List of Indian writers
- List of Hindi-language poets
