= Ngawang Sangdrol =

Tibet activist (born 1977)

- ངག་དབང་སངས་སྒྲོལ།
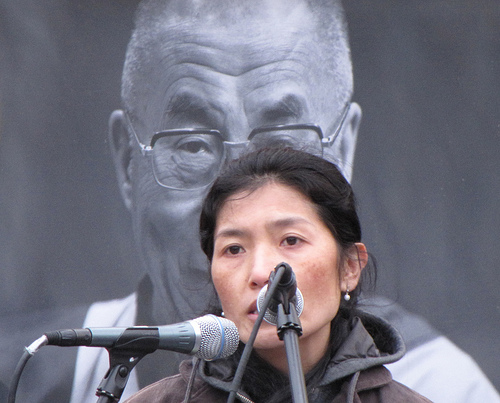
- Ngawang Sangdrol at a free Tibet rally in New York City
- Born: 1977 (age 48–49)
- Occupations: Human rights activist, Human rights analyst
- Years active: 1987 to present
- Employer: International Campaign for Tibet
- Known for: China’s longest serving female prisoner convicted of counterrevolution Also one of youngest people to be convicted of counterrevolution in China
- Movement: Tibetan independence movement
- Criminal charges: Counterrevolutionary propaganda and incitement
- Criminal penalty: a 3 year sentence (later extended to a total of 23 years for committing counterrevolutionary crimes in prison)
- Criminal status: Released in 2002
- Awards: Prize of the Tibetan Youth Congress

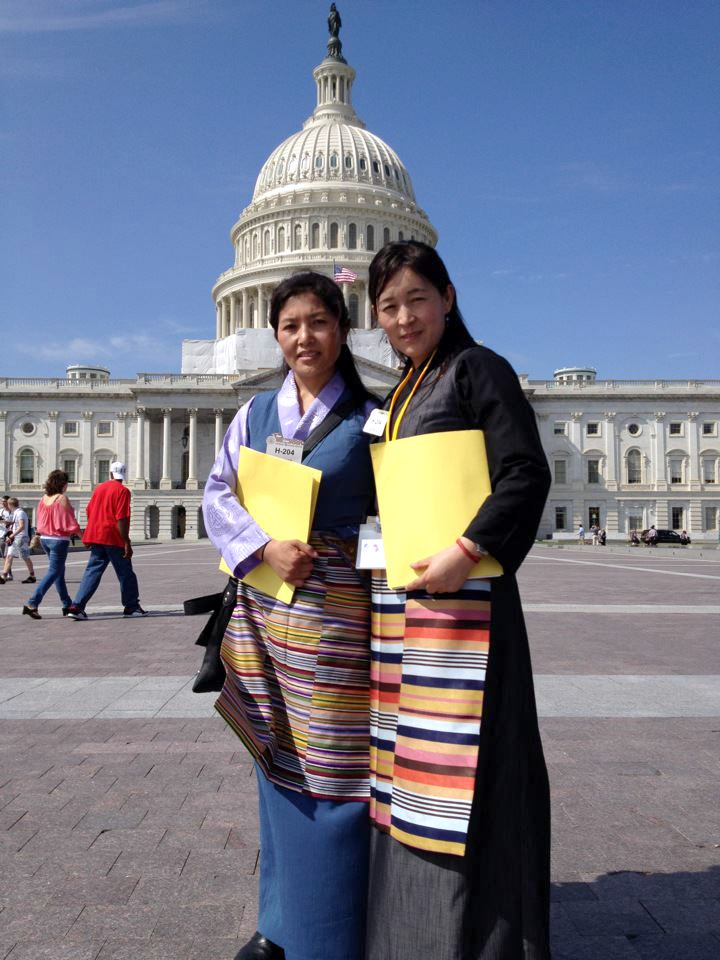
Ngawang Sangdrol and Lhamo Tso at the US Capitol on Tibet Lobby Day 2012

Ngawang Sangdrol (born in Lhasa, Tibet, in 1977) is a former political prisoner, imprisoned at the age of 13 by the Government of the People's Republic of China, for peacefully demonstrating against the Chinese occupation of Tibet in 1992. She was at first held for eight months without trial, before being sentenced to a three-year prison term. Her sentence was extended repeatedly for continued protest in prison, which included recording a tape of freedom songs with 13 other nuns from Drapchi Prison that was smuggled out of Tibet.

== Prison ==
As a 13-year-old nun Ngawang became one of the youngest people convicted in China for calling for Tibet's independence. However, as her resolve for Tibetan Independence carried on in prison, Ngawang's original 3-year sentence was extended to a 23-year prison term after hearings in 1993, 1996 and 1998 (six years, eight years and six years respectively). These extensions were brought about due to Ngawang 'committing counterrevolutionary crimes in prison'.

== Musical Protest in Prison ==
One of the protests that extended Ngawang's sentence occurred in October 1993 when Ngawang Sangdrol and 13 other nuns clandestinely recorded songs and poems in tribute to their homeland and the 14th Dalai Lama from inside Drapchi prison. In total 27 tracks were able to be secretly recorded and smuggled out of prison. Ngawang was the youngest of the thirteen Singing Nuns of Drapchi Prison. The recording made it out of Tibet and the CD, "Seeing Nothing but the Sky..." was available through the Free Tibet Campaign in London.

The sentences of the fourteen nuns were extended for a further three years when the Chinese authorities learned of the recordings . In addition to this extension, the fourteen nuns were reportedly beaten for refusing to sing pro-china songs during a later flag raising ceremony. Several of the protesters reportedly died due to the beatings. The cases include Ngawang Lochoe who died at age 28 from acute (necrotizing) pancreatitis; according to her records she had only been hospitalised on the day of her death and also novice nun Sherab Ngawang who was arrested alongside Ngawang. Sherab died from multiple organ damage due to her treatment. After Sherab's death her internal organs were able to be examined her organs were said to resemble those of a one-hundred-year-old instead of an eighteen-year-old.

Even though Ngawang Sangdrol and all of the other nuns suffered hugely during their imprisonment, Ngawang is adamant that their objective was worth the sacrifice.

This sentiment is also carried in many of the nun's lyrics that were recorded:

"We friends and prisoners,

We will look for joy [the Dalai Lama],
It doesn’t matter if we are beaten,
/ Our arms cannot be separated,
The eastern cloud is not fixed on the horizon,

The time will come for the sun to appear."

== Treatment in Prison ==
The beatings after the flag-raising ceremony was not an isolated incident. Torture was used against the nuns throughout their detention. These included the use of many instruments of physical torture; including the use of hard labour, the use of metal bars, electric cattle prods, and suspending her by her arms with her arms tied behind her back. However, Ngawang states that the psychological torture was far worse. Ngawang still suffers from headaches, stomach and kidney problems due to how she was treated and due to her exile has not been able to visit her family.

== International Support ==
As the nun's recordings began circulating around Tibet, they helped to create further interest in their plight. Ngawang Sangdrol became an Amnesty International Prisoner of Conscience. In addition, Ngawang was also nominated by members of the European Parliament for the 2001 Sakharov Prize for freedom of thought.

== Release and Activism ==
As a result of intense international pressures from various Human Rights and Tibetan political organizations, as well as John Kamm, director of the Dui Hua Foundation, her sentence was commuted to 11 years from her original 23-year sentence. She was released in October 2002. Due to Ngawang's health problems the Dui Hua Foundation arranged for Ngawang to fly for treatment in the United States in March 2003. Since her release and exile Ngawang has remained a prominent figure in the Tibetan independence movement. Quickly after her release Ngawang became involved in lobbying of the release of fellow singing nun Phuntsog Nyidron who was finally released in 2004, after 16 years imprisonment, thus making Phuntsog Tibet's longest serving prisoner of conscience. Ngawang presently works for the International Campaign for Tibet as a Human Rights analyst Additionally, she is now a citizen of the United States and is able to practice Tibetan Buddhism once again.

== Prisonnière à Lhassa ==
In 2003 French authors Philippe Broussard and Danielle Laeng released the book, "Prisonnière à Lhassa" (which translates into English as 'The Prisoner of Lhasa') detailing the ongoing protests, imprisonment and subsequent release of Ngawang Sangdrol. The book inspired the French Film Director Marie Louville to create the 2006 documentary with the same name.

== See also ==
- Political prisoner
