= Gaocheng, Sichuan =

Litang Town
- Town

Tibetan transcription(s)
  - Tibetan: མཐོ་གྲོང་གྲོང་རྡལ།
  - Wylie: mtho grong grong rdal

Chinese transcription(s)
  - Chinese: 高城镇
  - Pinyin: Gāochéng Zhèn
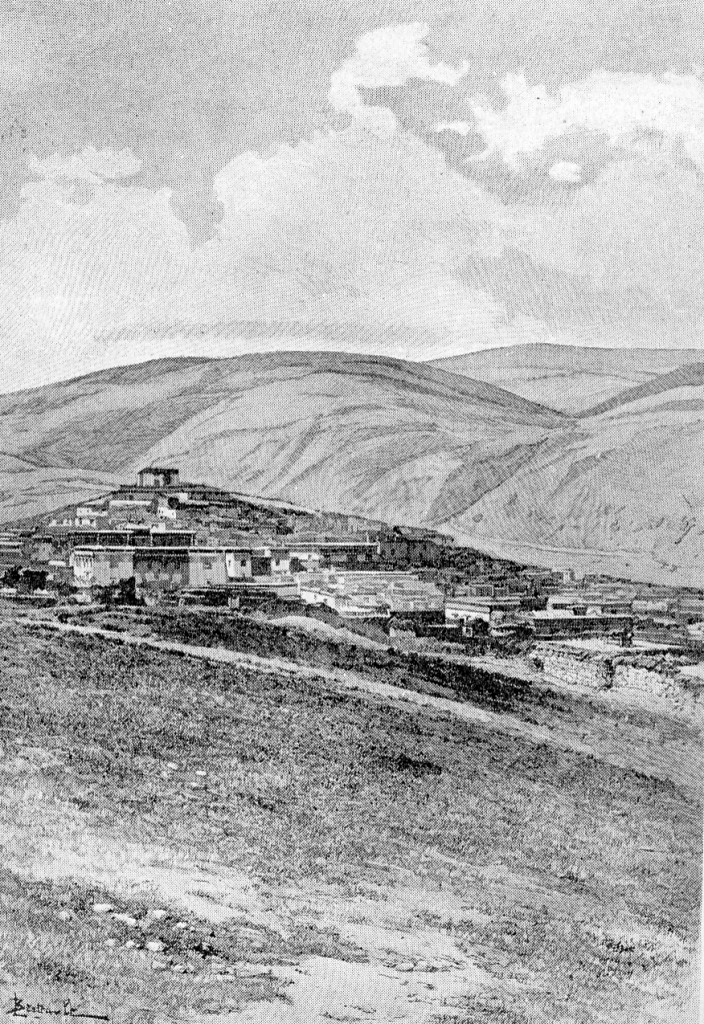
- Litang Town in the 1840s
- Interactive map of Litang Town
- Country: China
- Province: Sichuan
- Prefecture: Garzê
- County: Litang County
- Elevation: 4,014 m (13,169 ft)

Population (2001)
  - Total: 47,500
- Time zone: UTC+8 (China Standard)

Gaocheng Town (Tibetan: མཐོ་གྲོང་གྲོང་རྡལ།, Wylie: mtho grong grong rdal; Chinese: 高城镇; pinyin: Gāochéng Zhèn, literally: high town), also known as Litang (Lithang, Tibetan: ལི་ཐང།, Wylie: li thang, 理塘), is the administrative centre of Litang County in the southwest of the Garzê Tibetan Autonomous Prefecture in Sichuan Province of China.

The county in 2001 had a population of 47,500, the vast majority of which is ethnically Tibetan. Several famous Buddhist figures were born here, including the 7th Dalai Lama, 10th Dalai Lama, four of the Pakpalhas (Wylie: 'phags pa lha), and has strong connections with the eponymous hero of the Epic of King Gesar, as well as the 5th Jamyang Shêpa of Labrang Monastery.

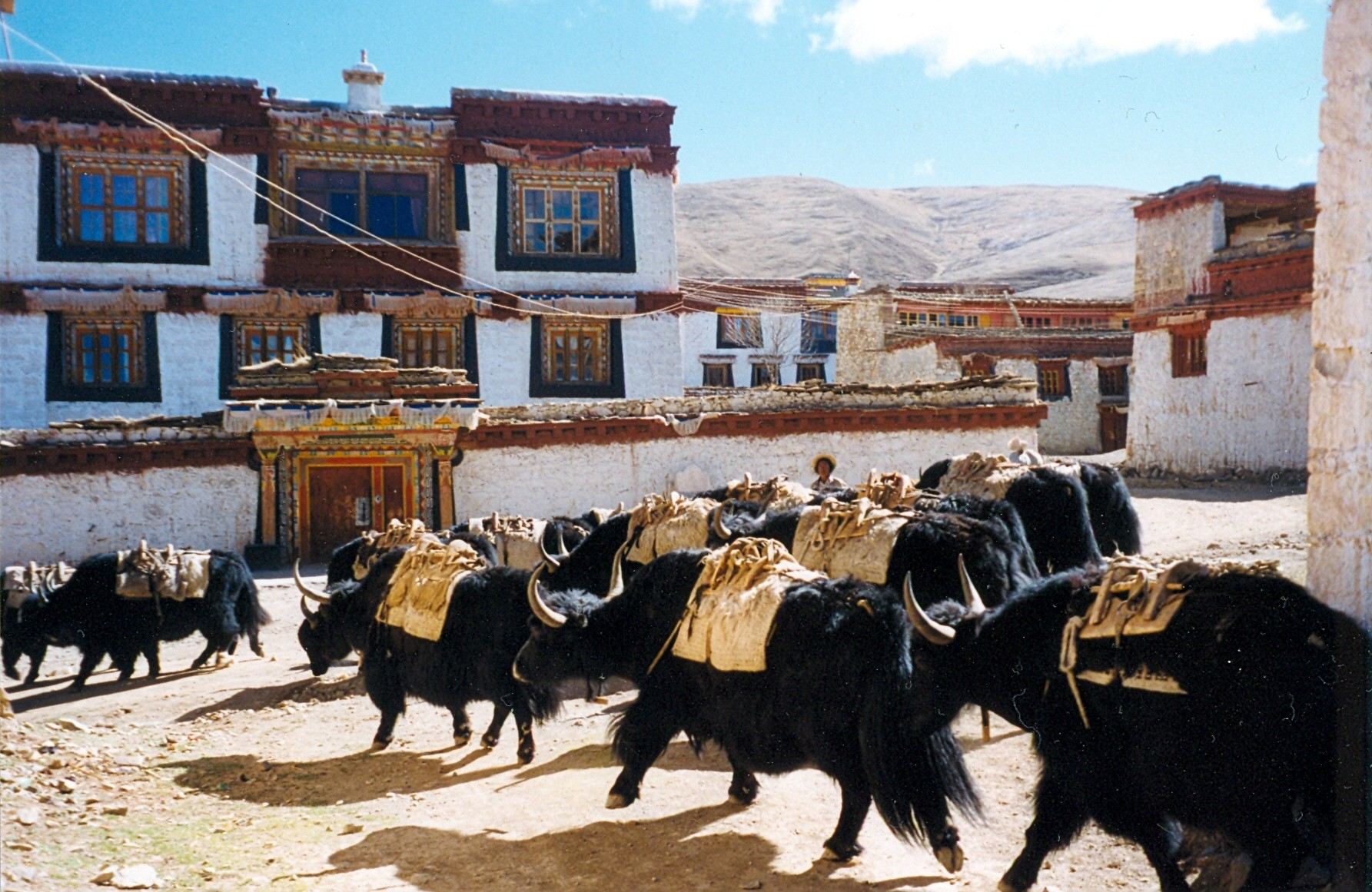
Yaks in the Ganden Thubchen Choekhorling monastery courtyard.

Litang Town is located at an altitude of 4,014 metres (13,169 ft) among open grasslands and surrounded by snow-capped mountains. Its actual altitude is about 400 metres higher than Lhasa, making it one of the highest towns in the world. The town itself is centred just to the south of the Ganden Thubchen Choekhorling or Litang Chöde Monastery.

The monastery was built by the 3rd Dalai Lama (1543–1588) in 1580 after the king of Lithang, who ruled the region as de facto independent ruler, switched allegiance from the Kagyu to the Gelug.

During the 1950s the region around Litang was one of the main areas of Tibetan armed resistance to the PLA occupation. A resistance group called "Four Rivers, Six Ranges" was active in the area. In 1956 the monastery was bombed by the People's Liberation Army.

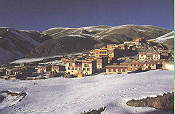
Litang

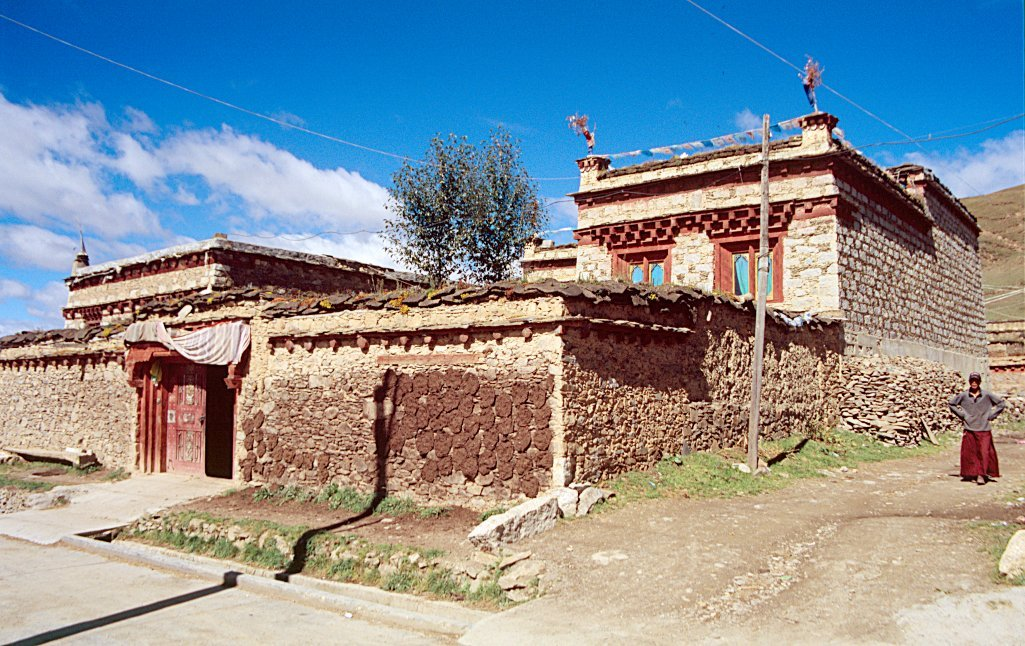
Tibetan home, Litang

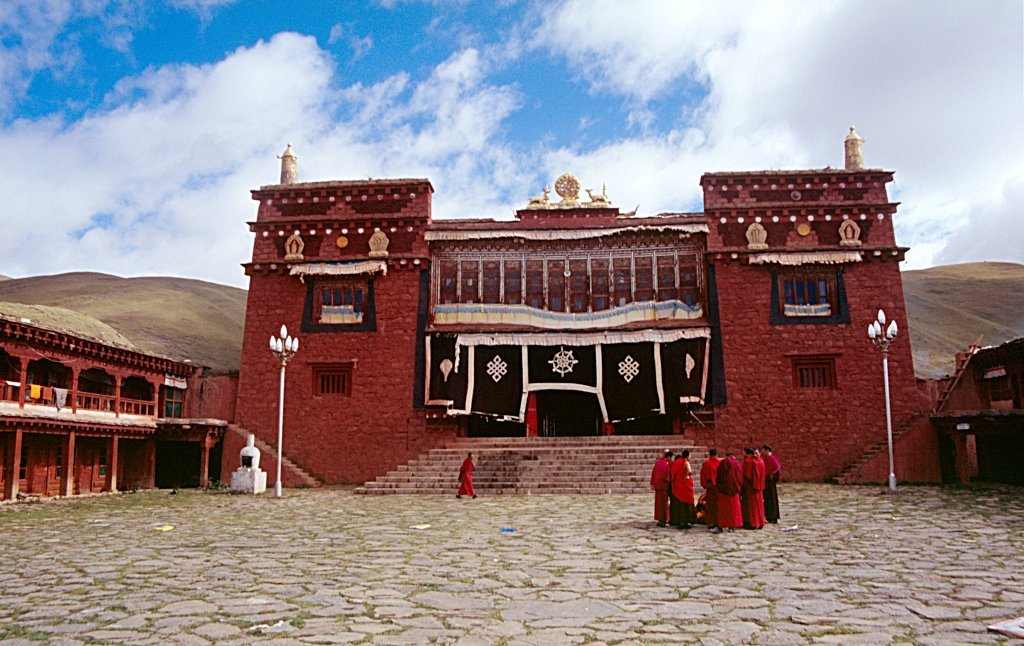
Litang Chöde Monastery

There are hot springs just 4 km from the centre of town on the western outskirts.

In August, 2007, a horse-racing festival at Litang was the scene of an impromptu anti-government political speech by Runggye Adak, which was followed by protests calling for his release including 200 people who went to the police station but were allowed to leave unharmed. A crackdown officially described as "patriotic education campaign" followed in autumn of 2007, including several politically motivated arrests and attempts to force local Tibetans to denounce the 14th Dalai Lama.
