= Free Tibet =

Non-profit, non-governmental organization

- Founded: 1987
- Type: Non-profit
- Location: London, England
- Key people: Daniel Russell (chair), Sam Walton (chief executive)
- Website: freetibet.org

Free Tibet (FT) is a non-profit, non-governmental organisation, founded in 1987 and based in London, England. According to their mission statement, Free Tibet advocates for "a free Tibet in which Tibetans are able to determine their own future and the human rights of all are respected."

According to their website, FT campaigns for an "end to China's occupation of Tibet and for international recognition of Tibetans' right to freedom". The organisation is a member of the International Tibet Network (ITN), a worldwide group of affiliated organisations campaigning for human rights and self-determination in Tibet. They mobilize active support for the Tibetan cause, champion human rights, and challenge those whose actions sustain what they see as occupation.

== Current activity ==
=== Political prisoners ===
As a result of China's censorship, many political dissenters are arrested and imprisoned for promoting or expressing religious, social, economic, and political principles the Chinese Communist Party (CCP) disapproves of. FT seeks the release of political prisoners through lobbying political leaders, circulating petitions, and organising urgent action campaigns. This approach has been successful in securing the early release of prominent political prisoners such as Phuntso Nyidon, reducing Tenzin Delek Rinpoche's sentence from a death sentence to life in prison and was possibly influential in ensuring Runggye Adak's relatively low-length sentence in 2007. FT maintains a list of current prisoners, released prisoners, and those that have received death sentences.

In its 2022 Country Reports on Human Rights Practices: China (Includes Hong Kong, Macau, and Tibet), the U.S. State Department cited FT's report on driver Rinchen Dorjee's release by the CCP authorities after nine months of incommunicado detention in police custody.

=== Save Larung Gar ===
In June 2016, FT received reports that Larung Gar Buddhist Academy in eastern Tibet was soon to undergo a series of evictions and demolitions. An order issued by the government of Serta County stated that the population was to be reduced to a maximum of 5,000 residents over the next 15 months, down from the well over 10,000 living there at the time. The order also imposed a system of joint management on the monastery, with Chinese Communist Party officials outnumbering monastic officials three to two under the new regime. The monastery was also required to hand over financial management to Chinese authorities. The work at Larung Gar began on 20 July 2016, as residents were moved out and their residences demolished. Free Tibet was able to garner media attention for the situation at Larung Gar with stories in the BBC, The Times and The New York Times among others. Free Tibet helped to organise a series of world-wide protests at Chinese embassies and also initiated an online petition and various emailing campaigns directed at the United Front Work Department, Chinese embassies and foreign ministers. Following on from these, the situation at Larung Gar was brought up by the US State Department, the Tom Lantos Human Rights Commission as well as various Canadian and British MPs.

== Past campaigns ==
=== InterContinental: Parasites in Paradise ===
In 2013 FT launched the Parasites in Paradise campaign to protest Intercontinental Hotels' opening of the Lhasa Paradise Hotel in Tibet.

Together with Students for a Free Tibet, FT called for a boycott of InterContinental Hotels, asserting that the Lhasa Paradise Hotel was little more than a "PR coup for the Chinese government" and that the marginalisation of the Tibetan people will only increase with the building of the hotel. On their website Free Tibet writes that, "Intercontinental will sell the image of a peaceful, spiritual and unspoiled land, but after more than 60 years of military occupation by the world's largest dictatorship, Tibet is no paradise." Additionally, it has been argued that the Tibetan people themselves would not benefit from any jobs or opportunities which would be created by the hotel's opening as the hotel's staff will speak Chinese, a language most Tibetans do not speak. Tibetan illiteracy is a major concern of many activists and scholars as Chinese is the language of economic, social, and political life in Tibet.

In addition to the boycott, Free Tibet sent a petition of over 10,500 signatures to InterContinental's chief executive Richard Solomons. The petition called for Solomons to pull InterContinental out of Lhasa because IHG's operation of a hotel in Tibet, where China's human rights violations have been especially prominent, "is in direct contradiction to Intercontinental's Corporate Social Responsibility policies." Free Tibet also organised protests in London in an effort to sway InterContinental.

=== Stop Torture campaign ===
Investigations into China's human rights situation have shown that torture is used routinely in many prisons and interrogations. In 2008 Free Tibet submitted evidence to the UN Committee Against Torture in Geneva detailing the record of abuse inside Tibet. Subsequently, the UN Committee concluded that torture in Tibet is "widespread and routine".

FT has also worked alongside celebrities such as Alan Rickman, David Threlfall, Juliet Stevenson, and Dominic West to record testimonies of tortured Tibetans. The organisation used the video testimonies to create more awareness and urge people to take action by writing to William Hague and Chinese political representatives to put a stop to torture in Tibet.

In 2004 Free Tibet organised a UK tour for Palden Gyatso, a Tibetan monk who was arrested during the Chinese invasion of Tibet. Gyatso spent 33 years in Chinese prisons and labor camps enduring systematic torture after being arrested for calling for Tibet's freedom. Gyatso was released in 1992 and escaped to India, he has since toured the world spreading awareness about human rights violations in Tibet. During the 2004 tour he spoke at numerous conventions, and events. In Tibet, Tibetans are subjected to ongoing torture and mistreatment by the Chinese government, who accuse them of jeopardizing "national security" or "inciting separatism" among their community.

In February 2015 Free Tibet joined with their research partner, Tibet Watch, to write a report on Chinese torture in Tibet. The report, "Torture in Tibet", it was submitted to the United Nations Committee Against Torture. "Torture in Tibet" documents torture survivor testimonies from Golog Jigme, Tenzin Namgyal, and Kelsang Tsundue, Tibetan deaths in custody, deaths resulting from torture, and a number of prisoners who they believe to be at particular risk of torture. The use of torture is widespread and routine in the restive Chinese region of Tibet, and authorities routinely ignore legal safeguards to prevent it.

=== Confucius Classrooms: Hosting a Dragon ===
Free Tibet launched their Confucius Classroom campaign in order to spread awareness about the negative aspects of Hanban's Confucius Institute. The Confucius Institute is a program run through the organisation Hanban which is directed by the People's Republic of China Ministry of Education. Confucius Institutes are established over 500 Confucius Institutes in Universities and well over 600 Confucius Classrooms in schools overseas. Although Confucius Classrooms focus on language and culture, the Hanban employed tutors must also promote an "understanding of China" and the tutors are banned from teaching about certain aspects of Chinese history, culture, and society. The program has been labeled by some as propagandistic and has been criticised for limiting academic freedom and thought through self-censorship. This controversy was enhanced when a senior Chinese politician described the programme as "an important part of China's 'overseas propaganda set-up'".

FT has been providing media updates, press releases, and news stories regarding Confucius Classrooms in the UK. The organisation has also reached out to schools operating Confucius Classrooms and provided them with teaching materials to ensure that students also learn about the humanitarian and environmental issues surrounding Tibet. Additionally, Free Tibet calls for public action through contacting local Ministry of Education officials.

=== Jailed Musicians ===
Through their Jailed Musicians campaign Free Tibet works to bring awareness to the global community of China's censorship laws. The organisation lists ten different musicians who have been arrested and imprisoned because of their artistic works, however many other unlisted Tibetan musicians have been detained. Free Tibet approached the UN and in a joint urgent appeal asked for an official inquiry into the whereabouts of each musician as many of the artists' whereabouts are unknown. The UN responded and China was forced to provide information concerning the trials, whereabouts, and sentences of most of the jailed singers. However Chinese officials could not account for the whereabouts or conditions of two different men who had also been arrested. The charge laid against the musicians was for, "seditiously splitting the state", and the men received sentences ranging two to six years; however many of the imprisoned singers were held without a trial or legal representation for extended periods of time. Free Tibet calls for the release of the jailed singers, stating, "Music is a vital part of Tibetans' resistance to Chinese rule. Singers like these not only keep alive a culture that China is trying to erase from the world, but their songs embody the aspirations, fears and courage of a people who remain and defiant after 60 years of occupation." The campaign focuses on educating the public about the censorship and oppression of art and expression in China while also advocating for the imprisoned men through a petition and through lobbying domestic and foreign politicians.

=== Break the Silence ===
Free Tibet launched their Break the Silence campaign to highlight the reluctance of world leaders to publicly speak out in support of Tibet. China's foreign policy surrounding the Dalai Lama is strict and world leaders' meetings with the Dalai Lama oftentimes causes major friction with China.

The campaign encourages supporters to write to world leaders and ask them to speak out for Tibet. Two videos were developed by Free Tibet, one featuring David Cameron and one featuring Barack Obama.

=== Olympics protests ===
In March 2008 Free Tibet reported extensively on the unrest in Tibet which precipitated a series of large scale protests. Tibet Support Groups (TSGs) continue to gather evidence about the protests, their suppression and repercussions.

During the process of securing an Olympics bid from the International Olympic Committee (IOC), China promised to improve its human rights record. Wang Wei, head of the bid committee was quoted saying, "We are confident that the Games coming to China not only promote our economy but also enhance all social conditions, including education, health and human rights." However, China largely failed to improve its human rights abuses and major news sources around the world criticised both the Chinese government for failing to fulfil its promise and the IOC for not being more discerning in its choice for the 2008 Olympics. Activists argued that China's human rights violations were incompatible with the spirit of the Olympic Games.

Free Tibet worked to expose Chinese human rights violations through helping to organise and participating in large scale rallies in central London during the 2008 Summer Olympics torch relay in which thousands of Tibet supporters filled the streets. The magnitude of the protests was such that China and the IOC were forced, in a move that was highly publicised, to reduce and re-route relays in other cities.

Following the Olympics, China analysts speculated on the possibility that the authorities would begin dealing harshly with Tibetan dissenters after world attention moved off Beijing.

Again in 2012, Free Tibet started a campaign with a focus on the Olympics, the new campaign was titled Fly the Flag. In order to highlight China's illegal occupation of Tibet, Free Tibet encouraged supporters to send in pictures of themselves with the flag of Tibet at Olympic locations around London and Great Britain. Through this campaign Free Tibet also exposed the IOC's ban on the Tibetan flag at the Olympics. Fly the Flag especially highlights Chinese suppression of Tibetan freedom of expression as the Tibetan flag itself is banned in China and anyone in possession of the flag or its image is subject to official questioning and arrest.

=== Olympics 2022 ===
Free Tibet unsuccessfully created a petition calling for the International Olympic Committee (IOC) to refrain from giving the bid for the 2022 Winter Olympics to Beijing. In 2008 when Beijing hosted the summer Olympics, China promised to improve its human rights record before the Olympic Games. However China failed to ameliorate their human rights abuses and instead continued to oppress citizens and media outlets. On the basis of continued human rights violations, Free Tibet argued that China should not be considered a suitable place for the 2022 Winter Olympics.

On 10 June 2015 Free Tibet worked with the International Tibet Network to stage a protest outside of the Lausanne Palace Hotel in Lausanne, Switzerland. The protest was successful in disrupting the bid process and in catching the attention of international media.

=== Another Perfect Day in Tibet ===
In 2014, a Free Tibet investigation uncovered around 100 fake online accounts Chinese authorities were using propagandistically. The accounts had fake western names and photographs taken from randomly chosen websites and personal accounts. Each fake profile circulated pro-Chinese, anti-Dalai Lama propaganda in an attempt to convince followers that Tibet was free from humanitarian and environmental strife and portrayed it as an idyllic and peaceful province of China. Free Tibet wrote that, "China is highly sensitive to any signs of international support for Tibetan freedom and has declared its intention to 'win over' Western public opinion on the issue. Its message is that Tibetans have benefited hugely from Chinese investment and that the environment and culture of Tibet is protected and safe in China's hands", in its exposition of the propaganda campaign. Twitter removed the fake accounts after Free Tibet submitted an official complaint to the social media executives.

== See also ==
- List of organizations of Tibetans in exile
- International Tibet Network
- Tibetan Freedom Concert (1996–2012)
