= Zhangna Township, Sichuan =

Zhangna 藏坝乡
- Township
- Zhangnaxiang
- Location in Sichuan
- Coordinates: 29°44′39″N 99°48′7″E
- Country: People's Republic of China
- Province: Sichuan
- Autonomous prefecture: Garzê Tibetan Autonomous Prefecture
- County: Litang County
- Time zone: UTC+8 (China Standard)
- Postal code: 627557

Zhangna (Chinese: 章纳乡) is a township in Litang County, Garzê Tibetan Autonomous Prefecture, Sichuan, China.
