= Zangpo =

Zangpo (Tibetan: བཟང་པོ་, Wylie: bzang po) is a surname. Notable people with the surname include:

- Rinchen Zangpo (958–1055), principal translator of Sanskrit Buddhist texts into Tibetan
- Rongzom Chokyi Zangpo, scholar of the Nyingma school of Tibetan Buddhism
- Takna Jigme Zangpo (1926–2020), Chinese political prisoner
