= Wheel of Time (film) =

2003 documentary film by Werner Herzog

- Theatrical release poster
- Directed by: Werner Herzog
- Written by: Werner Herzog
- Produced by: Lucki Stipetic
- Starring: The Dalai Lama; Takna Jigme Zangpo
- Narrated by: Werner Herzog
- Distributed by: Werner Herzog Filmproduktion
- Release date: 2003
- Running time: 81 minutes
- Countries: Germany; United Kingdom; France; Italy
- Languages: German; English

Wheel of Time is a 2003 documentary film about Tibetan Buddhism by German director Werner Herzog. The title refers to the Kalachakra sand mandala that provides a recurring image for the film.

== Content ==
The film documents the two Kalachakra initiations of 2002, presided over by the fourteenth Dalai Lama. The first, in Bodhgaya India, was disrupted by the Dalai Lama's illness. Later that same year, the event was held again, this time without disruption, in Graz, Austria. The film's first location is the Bodhgaya, the site of the Mahabodhi Temple and the Bodhi tree. Herzog then turns to the pilgrimage at Mount Kailash, after which the film then focuses on the second gathering in Graz.

Herzog includes a personal interview with the Dalai Lama, as well as Tibetan former political prisoner Takna Jigme Zangpo, who served 37 years in a Chinese prison for his support of the International Tibet Independence Movement.

== Reception ==
On the review aggregator website Rotten Tomatoes, 94% of 18 critics' reviews are positive, with an average rating of 7.7/10. Metacritic, which uses a weighted average, assigned the film a score of 65 out of 100, based on 8 critics, indicating "generally favorable" reviews.
