= Tenzing Tsondu =

Tibetan singer, Internet celebrity, and businessman

丁真
- བསྟན་འཛིན་བརྩོན་འགྲུས་
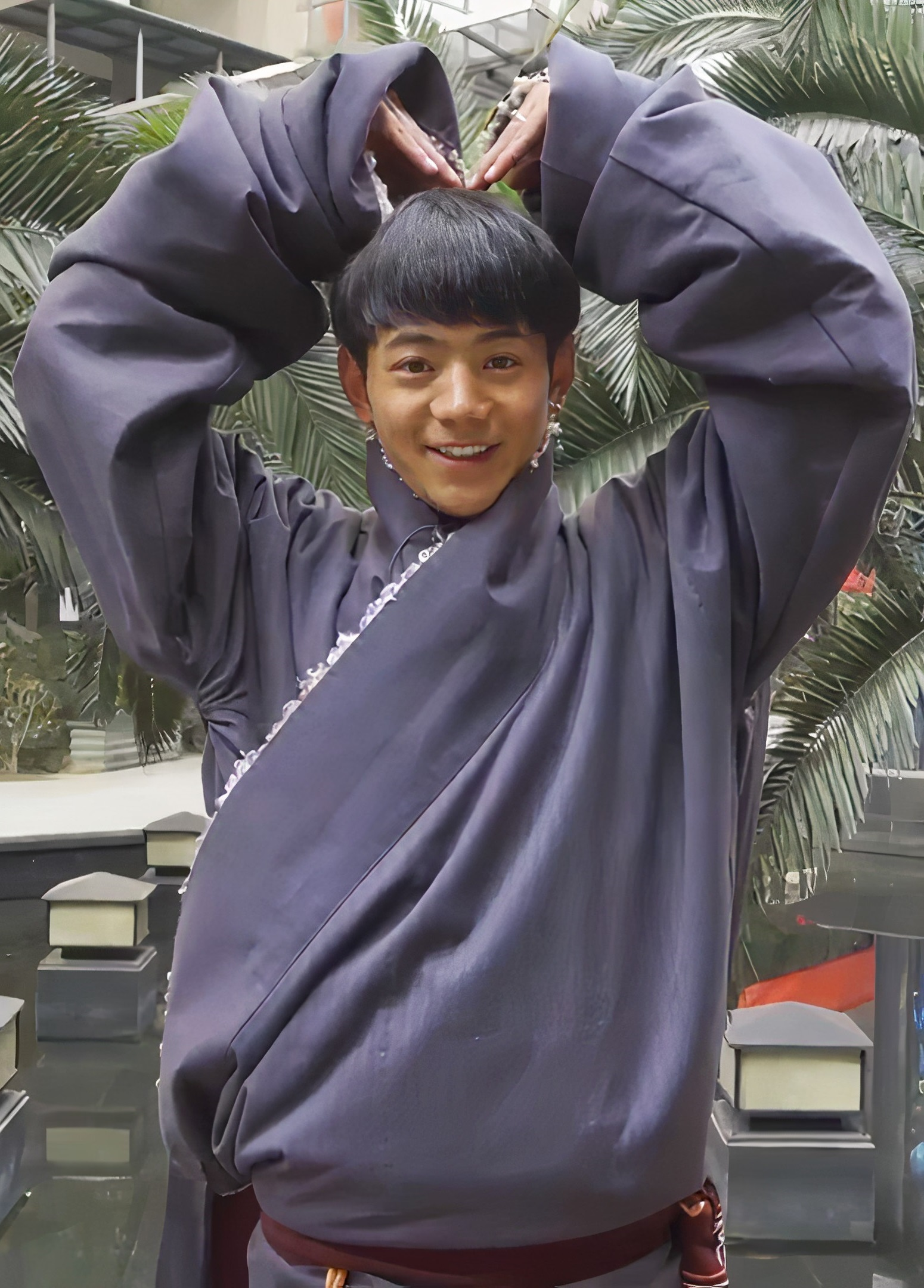
- Pronunciation: Tenzing Tsondu
- Born: 7 May 2001 (age 24); Litang, Sichuan, China
- Citizenship: China
- Education: Primary school dropout
- Occupation: Singer
- Years active: 2020 to present

Tenzing Tsondu (Tibetan: བསྟན་འཛིན་བརྩོན་འགྲུས་; Chinese: 丁真珍珠; Pinyin: Dīngzhēn Zhēnzhū; born 7 May 2001), known professionally as Ding Zhen (Chinese: 丁真), is a Tibetan media celebrity from Litang, Sichuan Province, China.

== Early life ==
He was a Khampa herdsman who did not finish primary school and barely speaks Mandarin.

== Ding Zhen Phenomenon ==
On 11 November 2020, he became famous on the Internet for a 7-second TikTok video clip taken by Chinese photographer Boge, and was named 'Sweet Wild Boy (Chinese: 甜野男孩; Pinyin: Tianye Nanhai)' by Chinese netizens. Within a few days, his related message was read by millions of people on Sina Weibo. On 18 November, he was recruited by Litang Culture, Tourism and Sports Investment Development Corporation Limited, a local state-owned company to promote the local tourism industry. Other East Asian countries, such as Japan and South Korea, have also covered him. Chinese Foreign Ministry spokesperson Hua Chunying also reposted photos of Ding Zhen on Twitter. The "Ding Zhen phenomenon" has led to a large number of Chinese tourists travelling to Tibetan areas, with a significant increase in orders for destinations such as Kangding airport and Daocheng Yading airport.

== Works ==
On 4 February 2021, Ding Zhen released his first album 1376 All Wishes Come True (1376心想事成) in collaboration with a Tibetan band, ANU.

== Controversy ==
Ding Zhen's sudden ascension to wealth and fame caused controversy, especially among China's small-town swots and incels. Some disparage his success as the "epitome of superficiality" while they struggle because their only path to success is in hard work in school and the workplace. Ding lacks formal education and yet gained wealth and status, including a job in a Chinese state-owned enterprise, which usually requires fierce competition to obtain.

The Central Tibetan Administration criticized the Chinese government's use of Ding Zhen as propagandistic and not really promoting Tibetan culture, especially their religion. Other critics argued that Ding Zhen's status as an ethnic minority contributes to fetishization and colonial-gazes from a China dominated by ethnic Han people, who view him and Khampa culture as a primitive and exotic "other". Furthermore, in attracting tourists interested in fulfilling their cottagecore fantasies, he risks shifting local traditions toward conformity with tourists' expectations.
