= Marie Louville =

French journalist

Marie Louville, is a French journalist, an expert on Tibet, and a director of documentary films on Tibet.

In 1987, before the Dalai Lama was awarded the Nobel Peace Prize and the Tibetan cause was not very well known, Louville directed a report on the situation in Tibet that was broadcast during the French TV news on the channel Antenne 2, and changed French public opinion. Subsequently, in 1991 she directed a documentary film on the Tibetan resistance movement: Tibet: Army of Shadows that was also broadcast on Antenne 2. In 1997, two years after the disappearance of the 6-year-old Gendhun Choekyi Nyima who was recognized by the Dalai Lama as the 11th Panchen Lama, she directed a film on the disappearance of the child, about whom there is still no news. In 1999, marking the 10th anniversary of the awarding of the Nobel Peace Prize to the Dalai Lama, she directed a documentary describing The Escape of the Dalai Lama. The film tells the story of his journey with comments from the Dalai Lama as well as survivors from that time. Louville was able to retrace the journey and secretly shoot the film in Tibet in the autumn of 1998.

In 2003, she again visited Tibet in secret and filmed the documentary: The Sidewalks of Lhassa which described in Lhasa the practice of prostitution in Tibet. In 2006, again secretly, Louville directed The Prisoner of Lhasa, a documentary film about the conditions of Tibetan political prisoners. The film describes the life of the Tibetan nun Ngawang Sangdrol and tells how John Kamm, director of the Dui Hua Foundation, contributed to her release. Pictures of Drapchi Prison and other detention centers close to Lhasa are included.

In 2007, Louville and her team directed a documentary film about the Qingzang railway, called "Tibet's colonisation train". The film was titled: Tanggula express, the train at the roof of the world.
