= Cunge Township, Sichuan =

Cunge Township 村戈乡
- Township
- Cungexiang
- Location in Sichuan
- Coordinates: 29°59′6″N 100°13′17″E
- Country: People's Republic of China
- Province: Sichuan
- Autonomous prefecture: Garzê Tibetan Autonomous Prefecture
- County: Litang County

Area
  - Total: 812.5 km^{2} (313.7 sq mi)

Population (2010)
  - Total: 2,663
  - Density: 3.278/km^{2} (8.489/sq mi)
- Time zone: UTC+8 (China Standard)

Cunge (Chinese: 村戈乡) is a township in Litang County, Garzê Tibetan Autonomous Prefecture, Sichuan, China. In 2010, Cunge Township had a total population of 2,663: 1,364 males and 1,299 females: 787 aged under 14, 1,783 aged between 15 and 65 and 139 aged over 65.

== See also ==
- List of township-level divisions of Sichuan
