= Litang Horse Festival =

Annual festival in Litang County, Sichuan, China

The Litang Horse Festival is a summer horse festival held in Litang County, Sichuan province, China. Khampas from all over the Tibetan Plateau come to trade, celebrate and ride. Khampas are Tibetan nomads who are usually herders.

The festival is normally held in the first week in August. During the festival, horsemanship displays and horse races are held using Tibetan Ponies. These small and fast horses are raced and shown to determine who owns the best horse. The horse festival is significant because it helps to establish a socio-economic hierarchy amongst the Khampas who participate. Much honor and prestige accrues to the Khampa who owns the best horse.

A very large tourism business has been built up on adventure trips and tours provided by companies who cater to individuals who are interested in horses and horsemanship. These companies take groups of tourists throughout the different Tibetan villages hosting horse festivals. This benefits the nomads' economy as well as that of the rest of China.
