= Arnould Bonneville de Marsangy =

Arnould Bonneville de Marsangy (1802–1894) was a French magistrate.

Marsangy was born in Mons, Belgium. He was a forerunner in the field of criminology and originator of ideas such as the criminal (proposed in 1848 and introduced in 1850), parole (which he termed "preparatory liberations"), the generalization of fines in lieu of imprisonment or compensation for victims of a miscarriage of justice, as well, as recidivism.

Marsangy died in 1894 in Paris, aged 92.

== Books ==
- De la récidive, ou des moyens les plus efficaces pour constater rechercher et réprimer les rechutes dans toute infraction à la loi pénale, 1844
- Des libérations préparatoires, 1846
- Traité des diverses institutions complémentaires du régime pénitentiaire, 1847
- Des pénalités pécuniaires au double point de vue de la répression des méfaits et du soulagement des classes indigentes, 1847
- De l'amélioration de la loi criminelle en vue d'une justice plus prompte, plus efficace, plus généreuse et plus moralisante, 1855 1
- Étude sur la moralité comparée de la femme, et de l'homme, au point de vue de l'amélioration des lois pénales et des progrès de la civilisation, 1862
