= Shangri Lhagyal =

Tibetan resistance fighter

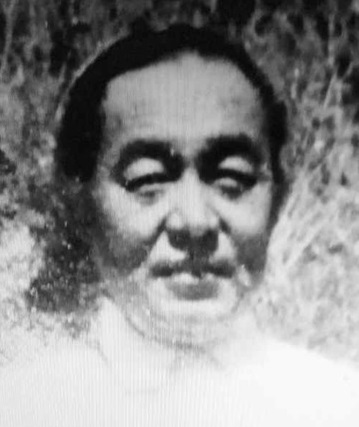
Shangri Lhagyal (1921-1984), a commander of Chushi Gangdrug

Chushi Gangdrug flag

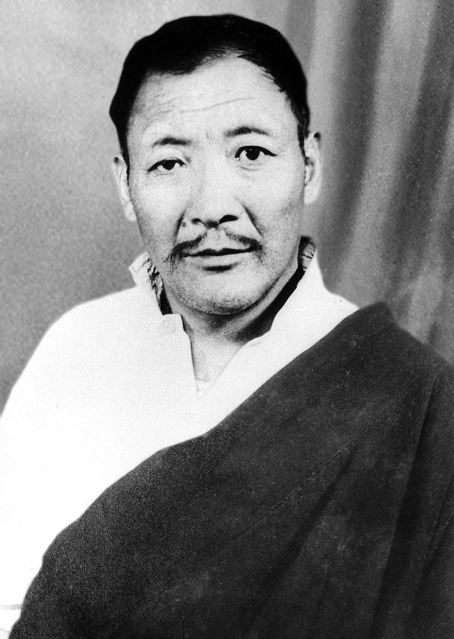
Gompo Tashi Andrugtsang, founder of Chushi Gangdrug

Chamdowa Tsawabomei Shangri Lhagyal (1921–1984) (also known as Chamdowa Shangri Lhagyal or Shangri Lhagyal) was a Tibetan resistance fighter against Chinese occupying forces in 1958–59. He was one of the commanders of the Chushi Gangdruk guerrillas. He fled to India in April 1959 shortly after the arrival there of the 14th Dalai Lama.

== Birthplace ==
Shangri Lhagyal was born in Tongpa Bangzo village, Zogan county, Chamdo prefecture in eastern Tibet in 1921. This village is known for its natural hot-springs and varieties of fruit trees. Tsawabomei has six scattered villages with five monasteries and nunneries. Each village is separated by twenty to thirty minutes walking distance. It also has a holy mountain, Kulagyaltsen, where the local people make religious offerings to their native deity.

== Commander of Chushi Gangdrug in Gongkar ==
Juchen Thupten Namgyal, ex-Prime Minister of The Tibetan Government in exile in Dharamsala, India, mentioned that Chamdowa Shangri Lhagyal was one of the commanders of Chushi Gangdrug in Gongkar Dzong. He narrated: "At Gongkar Dzong, Chamdowa Shangri Lhagyal and Derge Chudobu Wangchuk Tsering were the two Chushi Gangdrug commanders ... Makchi (commander) Shangri Lhagyal convened a meeting at Gongkar with his soldiers and new arrivals from Norbulingka. ... They shared their battle stories, and he shared the precarious situation in Norbulingka and the safe escape of His Holiness Dalai Lama from Lhasa. ... They discussed about future plans ... Makchi Shangri Lhagyal to remain in Gongkar ...".

== Victory in the Battle of Dra ==
"On 9 November 1958, Chamdowa Shangri Lhagyal led a successful attack on the Chinese troops in Drashi Dra. At mid-night when Ratuk Ngawang and his troops were camping at Drashi Phu, a messenger returned and briefed them about the situation in the surrounding areas. As they proceeded ahead in the night, they reached Drashi Dra, about 40 miles from Gongkar, in the morning. Here they met up with the forces led by Chamdowa Shangri Lhagyal."

== The 14th Dalai Lama's escape from Tibet into exile in 1959 ==
The 14th Dalai Lama safely escaped from Tibet into exile in India in 1959. On 17 March 1959, he and his entourage started the escape journey from Lhasa in Tibet, and reached the Indian border on 31 March 1959. During the entire escape, Chushi Gangdrug Tenshung Danglang Mak escorted him to safety in India. At the Indian border, the Chushi Gangdrug Tenshung Danglang Mak and the Tibetan Army soldiers stood in formation for a farewell salute and sought the Dalai Lama's blessing.

At that moment, it was difficult for him to say goodbye to the Chushi Gangdrug Tenshung Danglang Mak and Tibetan Army soldiers who had escorted the Dalai Lama and his entourage all the way from Lhasa safely to Indian border. At Bomdila, he was greeted by Mr. Menon and interpreter Sonam Topgyal carrying a telegram message from the Prime Minister Nehru: "My colleagues and I welcome you and send greetings on your safe arrival in India. We shall be happy to afford the necessary facilities to you, your family and entourage to reside in India. The people of India, who hold you in great veneration, will no doubt accord their traditional respect to your personage. Kind regards to you. Nehru."

== Assists the escape of Rinchen Dolma Taring ==
Rinchen Dolma Taring (popularly known as Taring Amala) was one of the most prominent educators in the exile Tibetan community in India, and the founder of "The Tibetan Homes Foundation, SOS Tibetan Children Village" in Mussoorie, India. She wrote her autobiography in 1986: Daughter of Tibet: The Autobiography of Rinchen Dolma Taring.

In Rinchen Dolma Taring's autobiography, she narrated how Shangri Lhagyal helped her safe escape to India: "Shangri Lhagyal was a nice, gentle man of about thirty-seven. He asked me to sit and congratulated me on my escape, but he was sorry to have told me that Taring Dzasa was not with His Holiness's party: he had seen the party off, so he knew. He added "I will gladly give you a letter—from where do you intend to enter India?" I replied, "Bhutan," and he assured me there were no Chinese on the way but asked, "Will the Bhutanese let you pass through?" At once Rabge said, "Yes, they will, because their Prime Minister's wife is Tsarong's daughter and their Queen is Taring Dzasa's cousin."

== Chushi Gangdrug surrender to Indian government ==
After the escape of the Dalai Lama, the idea of any further battle with the Chinese Communist troops was abandoned. Andrug Jindak persuaded Kunga Samten Dewatshang in Tawang to surrender his weapons to the Indian authorities. Shangri Lhagyal and other Chushi Gangdrug fighters handed over their weapons to the Indian officials at Tezpur, India. They offered a horse and a Khata (Tibetan scarf) to the Indian guards and completed the formalities, and crossed the border where they were greeted by a representative of the Tibetan Government Tsedrung Jampa Wangdu. On 29 April 1959, they handed over their rifles, ammunition, and all other weapons to the Deputy Commissioner of Tezpur district, and permitted to take their gold, silver, and other valuables.

== Forthcoming biography ==
Three researchers – Tashi Dhondhup, Dorjee Damdul, and Tashi Gelek – have conducted extensive research about the life of Shangri Lhagyal, and his major role in Chushi Gangdrug Tenshung Danglang Mak in 1959. Along with Shangri Lhagyal's life story, the researchers will narrate the history of Tibet from 1947 to 1959 in an upcoming book to be published in 2019.

The researchers are guided by a Tibet scholar, Professor Carole McGranahan, as an editor. McGranahan is a historical and anthropological expert on Chushi Gagndrug Tenshung Danglang Mak.
