= Tenzin Delek Rinpoche =

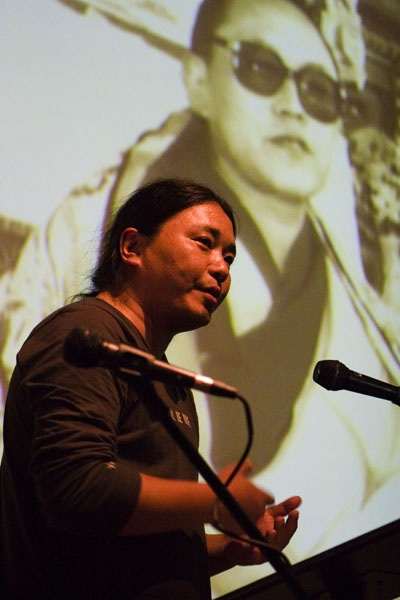
Thupten with Tenzin Delek image

Lithang Tulku Tenzin Delek Rinpoche or Tenzing Deleg (Tibetan: བསྟན་འཛིན་བདེ་ལེགས་, Wylie: Bstan 'dzin bde legs) (1950–2015) was a Tibetan Buddhist leader from Garze, Sichuan. He is also known for working to develop social, medical, educational and religious institutions for Tibetan nomads in eastern Tibet, as an advocate for environmental conservation in the face of indiscriminate logging and mining projects, and as a mediator between Tibetans and Chinese.

== Personal life ==
Rinpoche was born in Lithang, Tibet.

On 7 April 2002 he was arrested during a raid on Jamyang Choekhorling in Garze, Sichuan, China, and accused of being involved in a bomb attack on 3 April 2002 on the central square of Sichuan's provincial capital, Chengdu.

He was convicted for alleged involvement in a series of unsolved bombings in his region by the Chinese authorities and sentenced to death in December 2002 along with Lobsang Dhondup, a 28-year-old assistant of his. Lobsang was executed almost immediately in late January 2003, marking the first execution of a Tibetan for political crimes in 20 years. Tenzin Delek's trial began on 29 November 2002 before the Local Court in Garze and was sentenced to death with a two-year execution adjournment. Overseas human rights groups and United Nations human rights experts protested that the case against him was seriously flawed, that he did not receive a fair trial, and was mistreated in detention.

His sentence was commuted to life imprisonment on 26 January 2005. Many overseas advocates of Tenzin Delek Rinpoche continued to fight for a retrial.

In November 2009, 40,000 Tibetans in Tenzin Delek Rinpoche's home area signed a petition asking for a re-trial. They staged a hunger strike at the county seat of Lithang for a few days, which led to the temporary arrest of about 70 Tibetans.

He died on 12 July 2015 in Chengdu, China, at the age of 65. Prior to his death Tibetans and rights groups had called for his release on medical parole. His death was followed by calls for the release of his body in order to determine the cause of death and carry out traditional funeral rites; one protest was met by China's security forces opening fire, injuring several Tibetans. Chinese authorities cremated the body without an autopsy.

== Statement by Tenzin Delek ==
"Since I am a Tibetan, I have always been sincere and devoted to the interests and well-being of Tibetan people. That is the real reason why the Chinese do not like me and framed me. That is why they are going to take my precious life even though I am innocent."

== See also ==
- Political prisoners
