= News analyst =

A news analyst examines, analyses and interprets broadcast news received from various sources. Sometimes also called newscasters or news anchor or Broadcast News Analyst. News analysts write commentaries, columns, or scripts. They coordinate and sometimes serve as an anchor on news broadcast programs. They develop perspectives about news subjects through research, interviews, observation, and experience.

== Sub domains ==
1. Current events
2. Sports
3. Business
4. Entertainment
5. Politics
6. Crime

== References and external links ==
- Careerplanner.com Job Description and Jobs for: "Broadcast News Analyst"
