= Chushi Gangdruk =

Tibetan guerrilla group

Kham Four Rivers, Six Ranges Tibetan Defenders of the Faith Volunteer Army
- མདོ་སྟོད་ཆུ་བཞི་སྒང་དྲུག་བོད་ཀྱི་བསྟན་སྲུང་དང་བླངས་དམག་
- Military leader: Adruktsang Gonpo Tashi
- Founded: 16th June 1958
- Dissolved: 1974
- Headquarters: Driguthang, Lhoka; Tsona, Lhoka; Lhagyari, Lhoka; Mustang, Nepal
- Active regions: Tibet; Nepal
- Ideology: Anti-communism, Tibetan nationalism
- Status: Dissolved
- Website: Archived 2001-03-02 at the Wayback Machine

Chushi Gangdruk (Tibetan: ཆུ་བཞི་སྒང་དྲུག་, Wylie: Chu bzhi sgang drug, lit. 'Four Rivers, Six Ranges') was a Tibetan guerrilla force formed in 1958 to defend Buddhism from communist Chinese forces and ideology. With support from the United States Central Intelligence Agency (CIA), its members engaged in political, military, and propaganda operations against the People's Liberation Army (PLA) of China. After the 1959 Tibetan uprising, they assisted the flight of the 14th Dalai Lama to India, and the leader of the group was subsequently promoted by him. Chushi Gangdruk continued its operations from Nepal until 1974 when CIA funding for the program was terminated following the rapprochement between China and the U.S. under President Richard Nixon.

== Name ==
Chushi Gangdruk ("Four Rivers, Six Ranges") is the name traditionally given to the eastern Tibetan region of Kham where the gorges of the Gyalmo Nyulchu (Salween), Dzachu (Mekong), Drichu (Yangtze), and Machu (Yellow River) rivers, all arising on the Tibetan Plateau, pass between six parallel ranges of mountains (Duldza Zalmogang, Tshawagang, Markhamgang, Pobargang, Mardzagang, and Minyagang) that form the watersheds for these rivers. "Chu" (choo) is the Tibetan word for "water", and "shi" (she) is the Tibetan word for 4. "Gang" is range, and "druk" (drewk) means 6.

The group's full name was the "Kham Four Rivers, Six Ranges Tibetan Defenders of the Faith Volunteer Army" (Tibetan: མདོ་སྟོད་ཆུ་བཞི་སྒང་དྲུག་བོད་ཀྱི་བསྟན་སྲུང་དང་བླངས་དམག་, Wylie: mdo stod chu bzhi sgang drug bod kyi bstan srung dang blangs dmag).

== Background ==
In 1720 Tibet came under the rule of the Qing dynasty of China as its suzerain. In 1912 the succeeding Republic of China claimed inheritance of all Qing territories including Tibet. By 1917 most of the area comprising the present-day Tibet Autonomous Region had become a de facto independent polity. Border regions such as Amdo and eastern Kham remained under the control of the Chinese Nationalist Party (Kuomintang) and local warlords. After Kuomintang's defeat in the Chinese Civil War, remnants of its resistance in Xikang defected to the People's Republic of China (PRC) in 1949. During the following year, the PRC annexed Central Tibet and western Kham by capturing Chamdo and pressuring the government in Lhasa to negotiate. Repressive reforms introduced by the Chinese Communist Party in 1956 led to revolts in Kham and Amdo.

== Formation ==
The group was formally established by Andrug Gompo Tashi, although he had not been personally involved in the armed resistance against Chinese policies until December 1956 when he tried to unite the disparate guerrilla bands. Not much progress was made because while Khampas from Litang suffered the most from the PLA, those from other parts of Kham such as Batang still sided with Beijing. In 1957 Tashi appealed to Central Tibet for assistance but was rebuffed because Lhasa did not wish to antagonize the Chinese government. After he met up with two CIA-trained Tibetan agents, the trio tried to reach out to the 14th Dalai Lama via a confidant to discuss matters of providing material assistance to the rebels, forming underground resistance cells, and establishing a line of communication with the CIA, but their efforts did not bear fruit. In 1958 they departed Lhasa after consulting an oracle who said that they should leave and head south.

Tashi called for resistance fighters to join him at Drigu Tso, about 55 km east of Yamdrok Lake in Lhoka, and was updated on the situation farther to the east by two other CIA-trained Tibetan agents. Some Khampa clans had joined together under the title "Volunteer Army to Defend Buddhism", which became Chusi Gandruk in early 1958 as a reference to the mountains and rivers of Kham. On 16 June 1958, Tashi was named the head of the unified guerrilla group dubbed "National Volunteer Defense Army". Tensik Danglang Mak was appended to Chushi Gangdruk to appeal to Tibetans beyond the four rivers and six ranges, although its members were still predominantly Khampas. Chushi Gangdruk and their supporters held an impressive cavalry parade in Lhodak Dhama Dzong, burned incense to photographs of the Dalai Lama, and launched their new flag—two swords representing a deity with handles symbolic of Dorjee or thunderbolt and lotus flower.

According to Chushi Gangdruk, it started out with 18 commanders and operated under a 27-point military law governing the conduct of its volunteers. Initially militia members purchased their own weapons, mainly World War II-era British .303 in, German 7.92 mm, and Russian 7.62 mm rifles. Some of the funding and weapons for the group had also been secured through Khampa traders and businesspersons as well as sympathizers within the Lhasa government in Central Tibet. The group's headquarters was relocated from Driguthang to Tsona and later to Lhagyari in the fall of 1958.

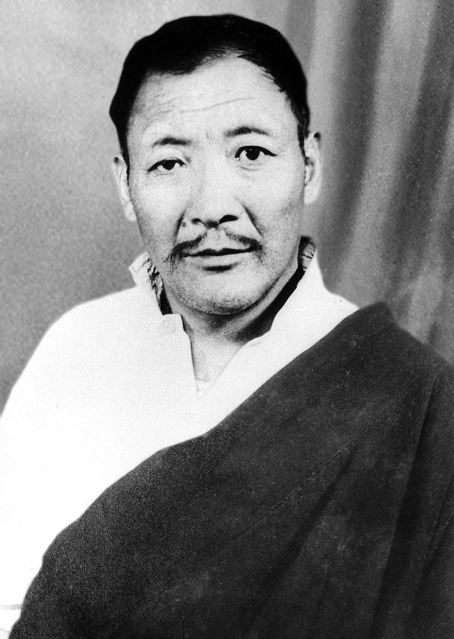
Andrug Gompo Tashi before 1959

== CIA support ==
Without getting approval from the Dalai Lama, the US Central Intelligence Agency (CIA) decided to go ahead to support the Chushi Gangdruk in the summer of 1959. The CIA provided the group with material assistance and aid, including arms and ammunition, as well as training to members of Chushi Gangdruk and other Tibetan guerrilla groups at Camp Hale. In addition to military operations, they were also trained in political and propaganda techniques.

The CIA made thirty-five to forty airdrops of weapons and ammunition (550,000 to 800,000 pounds total), including British .303 rifles, U.S. M-1 and M-2 rifles, 50 and 80 mm mortars, 57 and 75 mm recoilless rifles, 30-calibre light machine guns, 3.5 mm bazookas, as well as hand grenades, TNT, C-3 and C-4 explosives.

The Tibetan involvement with the U.S. came during a period of Cold War rhetorical anti-imperialism among major world powers, used to justify contemporary imperial expansion. Rhetorically, this new push for empire-building was manifested in the United States as anti-communism, and in the People's Republic of China as anti-capitalism.

Allen Dulles, the CIA deputy director responsible for overseeing all CIA covert operations, saw an opportunity to destabilize the People's Republic of China. The primary motive was more to impede and harass the Chinese Communists, than to render sufficient aid to the Tibetans.

On June 9, 2024, at Camp Hale, Colorado University's Department of Anthropology, Tibet Himalaya Initiative, Vail Symposium and Colorado Chushi Gangdruk organized a commemoration of the CIA and Chushi Gangdruk joint efforts.

== Surrender in India ==
The group assisted the escape of the 14th Dalai Lama to India in March 1959. After this, Andrug Gompo Tashi persuaded Kunga Samten Dewatshang in Tawang to surrender his weapons to the Indian authorities. Shangri Lhagyal and other Chushi Gangdruk fighters handed over their weapons to the Indian officials at Tezpur, India. They crossed the border where they were greeted by a representative of the Tibetan Government, Tsedrung Jampa Wangdu. On 29 April 1959, they handed over their rifles, ammunition, and all other weapons to the Deputy Commissioner of Tezpur district, and were permitted to take their gold, silver, and other valuables.

The 14th Dalai Lama conferred the rank of Dsasak to Tashi in a letter: "You have led the Chushi Gangdruk force with unshakeable determination to resist the Chinese occupation army for the great national cause of defending the freedom of Tibet. I confer on you the rank of Dzasak (the highest military rank equivalent to general) in recognition of your services to the country. The present situation calls for a continuance of your brave struggle with the same determination and courage". In addition, Tashi received gifts of priceless religious relics including an earthen statue of God of Protection Jigchi Mahai and holy beads.

== Later operations ==
From 1960 Chushi Gangdruk conducted its guerrilla operations from the northern Nepalese region of Mustang. In 1974 guerrilla operations ceased after the CIA, given the realignment of Sino-American relations initiated by President Richard Nixon, terminated its program of assistance to the Tibetan resistance movement and the Dalai Lama, the exiled Tibetan spiritual and temporal leader, taped a message telling the Tibetans to lay down their weapons and surrender peacefully.

== See also ==
- List of organizations of Tibetans in exile
- Tibetan American
- Tibetan Resistance Since 1950
- Special Frontier Force
