= John Kamm =

American businessman; human rights activist

John Kamm is an American businessman and human rights activist. He is the founder of the Dui Hua Foundation, a nonprofit humanitarian organization that claims to promote universal human rights in "well-informed, mutually respectful dialogue with China".

Since his first intervention on behalf of a Chinese prisoner in May 1990, Kamm has made more than 100 trips to China to engage the government in a dialogue on human rights issues, focusing on the treatment of prisoners and prison conditions. He has made 10 visits to Chinese prisons and has submitted requests for information on more than 1,000 prisoners. In an article about Kamm for The New York Times Sunday Magazine, Tina Rosenberg wrote: “No other person or organization in the world, including the State Department, has helped more Chinese prisoners."

Kamm received an AB from Princeton University (1972) and an AM from Harvard University (1975). He served as the Hong Kong correspondent and representative of the National Council for US-China Trade (1975–1979) and vice president (1989) and president (1990) of the American Chamber of Commerce in Hong Kong. Kamm also managed business operations for Occidental Chemical Company in China and East Asia (1981–1991).

== Hong Kong Chamber of Commerce ==
With no background in human rights, Kamm took his first activist stance as vice president of the American Chamber of Commerce in Hong Kong by convincing the majority of chamber members to pass a resolution condemning China's suppression of the Tiananmen Square protests of 1989. Despite strong opposition from many who thought the chamber should avoid making political statements, Kamm's initiative was a success.

As president of the chamber the following year, Kamm pressured Beijing to release individuals who were imprisoned for their participation in the Tiananmen Square protests. He also advocated for the extension of China's Most Favored Nation (MFN) trade status, arguing that engagement with China is more effective than sanctions at improving the status of political detainees.

== Advocacy work ==
From 1991 to 1994—the year US President Bill Clinton unconditionally renewed China's MFN trade status, Kamm started doing advocacy work full-time. Traveling frequently to China, he raised the names of hundreds of prisoners and received verbal information from the Chinese government on more than half of them. In 1995, China's State Council Information Offic

Since his first intervention on behalf of a Chinese prisoner in May 1990, Kamm has made more than 100 trips to China to engage the government in a dialogue on human rights issues, focusing on the treatment of prisoners and prison conditions. He has made 10 visits to Chinese prisons and has submitted requests for information on more than 1,000 prisoners. In an article about Kamm for The New York Times Sunday Magazine, Tina Rosenberg wrote: “No other person or organization in the world, including the State Department, has helped more Chinese prisoners."

== Background ==
e and the Ministry of Justice agreed to receive from Kamm quarterly prisoner lists of up to 25 names and began providing written responses on many of the cases.

Over the following years, the willingness of the Chinese government to cooperate with Kamm fluctuated in step with US-China relations. Despite periodic obstacles, Kamm continued traveling to Beijing and submitting prisoner lists. Although US-China relations were strained during the first half of 1999, Kamm went ahead with plans to establish Dui Hua in April 1999, serving as its first chairman and executive director.

Kamm's work has enabled many of China's political and religious prisoners to receive clemency in the form of sentence reductions, parole, and early releases, as well as better treatment in prison. One such person who benefited from Kamm's interventions, Tibetan nun Ngawang Sangdrol, was the focus of Marie Louville’s documentary film, Prisoner in Lhasa. The film documents how Kamm’s work contributed to Ngawang Sangdrol’s release.

Today, Kamm continues to travel throughout the United States, Europe, and China to meet with government officials, legal experts, and scholars on issues ranging from political and religious detainees, juvenile justice reform, women in prison and the implementation of the Bangkok Rules (Rules for the Treatment of Women Prisoners and Non-Custodial Measures for Women Offenders), and death penalty and criminal justice reform. He also frequently participates in talks, forums, councils and roundtables hosted by academic, governmental, and nongovernmental institutions worldwide. He has testified on numerous occasions to the US Congress, for example on November 3, 2011 to the US House Committee on Foreign Affairs.

== Awards and recognition ==
Kamm was awarded the Department of Commerce Best Global Practices Award by President Clinton in 1997 and the Eleanor Roosevelt Award for Human Rights by US President George W. Bush in 2001. In 2004 Kamm became the first businessman to be awarded a MacArthur Fellowship. In 2022, Kamm received the Harvard Centennial Medal for his work in human rights advocacy.

== Dui Hua Foundation ==
Kamm is the founder and executive director of the Dui Hua Foundation—dui hua is pinyin for the Chinese word meaning “dialogue.” Founded in 1999, Dui Hua is a nonprofit humanitarian organization dedicated to improving human rights in the United States and China through well-informed, mutually respectful dialogue. Based in San Francisco, Dui Hua seeks clemency and better treatment for prisoners detained in China for the nonviolent expression of their rights to free speech and association. The organization maintains a Political Prisoner Database which has - as of December 2024 - information on more than 49,400 political and religious prisoners. Dui Hua also advocates for systemic reform in the US and China in the areas of criminal and juvenile justice, women in prison, and the death penalty.
