= Kedarnath Agarwal =

Hindi Poet

- Born: 1 April 1911; Kamasin, Banda district, Uttar Pradesh
- Died: 22 June 2000 (aged 89)
- Occupation: poet

Kedarnath Agarwal (1 April 1911 – 22 June 2000), also spelled as Agrawal and Aggarwal,) was a Hindi language poet and writer.

== Early life and education ==
Agarwal was born on 1 April 1911 to Hanuman Prasad Gupta and Ghasiti Devi in Kamasin village, Banda district, Uttar Pradesh, in the Bundelkhand region. He completed his B.A. and L.L.B. degrees, and was an advocate in Banda beginning in 1938. He married Parvati Devi and together they had two daughters and a son.

== Career ==
He was a member of the Pragatisheel Lekhak Sangh, which takes inspiration from the leftist Progressive Writers' Movement. His works were translated into English, German, and Russian.

== Published work ==
Agarwal's published books are:

- Yug Ki Ganga
- Neend Ke Badal
- Lok Aur Alok
- Phool nahin Rang Bolte Hain
- Aag Ka Aayeena
- Bambay ka Raktasnan
- Gulmehndi
- Pankh aur Patwar
- Mar Pyar ki Thapein
- He Meri Tum
- Kahein Kedar Khari Khari
- Apoorva
- Vah Chidiya Jo
- Jamun Jal Tumzsa
- Bole Bol Abol
- Jo Shilayein Todte Hain
- Aatma Gandh
- Anhari Haryali
- Khuli Aankhein Khuli Daine
- Kedarnath Agarwal Research Book Kedarnath Agarwal Ki Kavita Me Lok Jeevan Ke Rang By Dr.Sunil Kumar Dubey
- Kedarnath Agarwal Research Book Kedarnath Agarwal Ka Vaishishty By Dr.Saket Kumar Pathak

== Awards ==
- Soviet Land Nehru prize in 1973
- Sahitya Akademi Award in 1986
- Honorary doctorate by Bundelkhand university in 1995.
