= Litang County =

Litang County 理塘县 • ལི་ཐང་རྫོང་།
- County
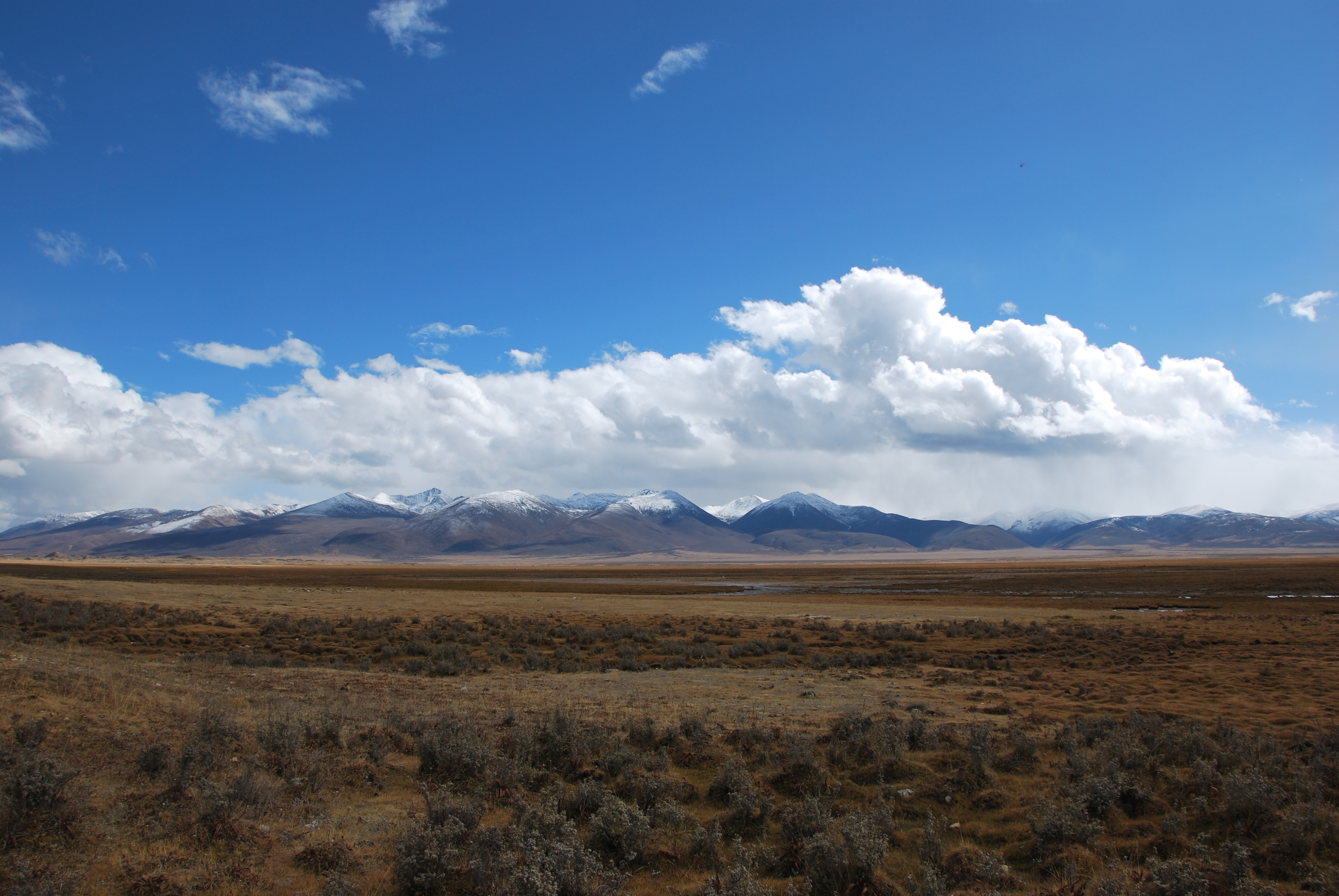
- Landscape of Litang County

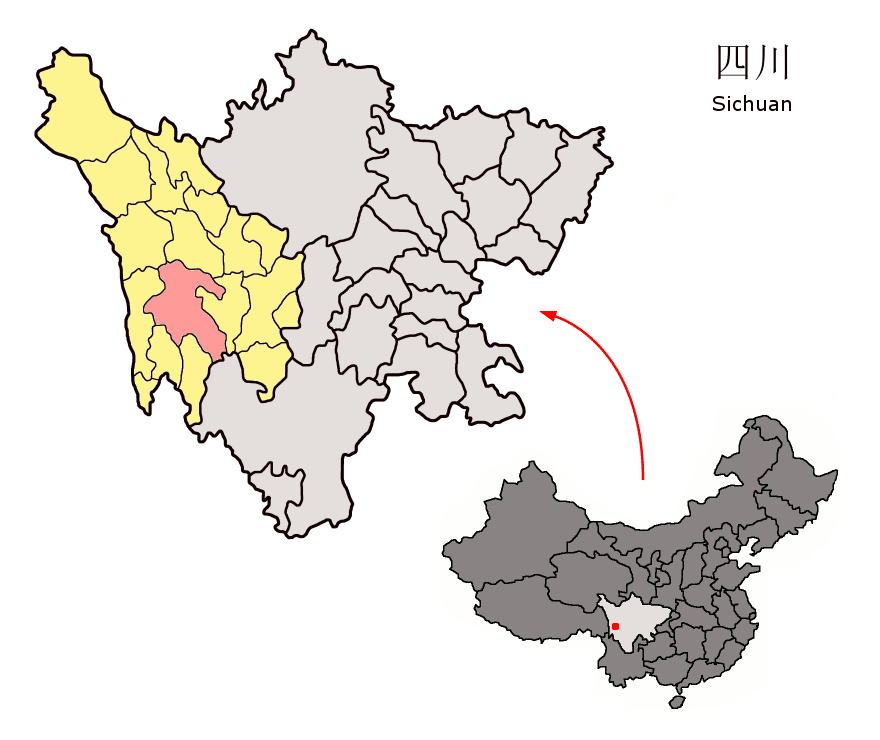
- Litang County (red) in Garzê Prefecture (yellow) and Sichuan

- Location of the seat in Sichuan Litang (China)
- Coordinates (Litang County government): 29°59′39″N 100°16′09″E
- Country: China
- Province: Sichuan
- Autonomous prefecture: Garzê
- County seat: Tochong (Litang)

Area
  - Total: 13,677 km^{2} (5,281 sq mi)
- Elevation: 3,954 m (12,972 ft)

Population (2020)
  - Total: 67,293
  - Density: 4.9202/km^{2} (12.743/sq mi)
- Time zone: UTC+8 (China Standard)
- Website: litang.gov.cn

Litang County

Chinese name
- Simplified Chinese: 理塘县
- Traditional Chinese: 理塘縣
Transcriptions
Standard Mandarin
- Hanyu Pinyin: Lǐtáng Xiàn
Yue: Cantonese
- Jyutping: lei^{5}tong^{4} jyun^{2}

Tibetan name
- Tibetan: ལི་ཐང་རྫོང་།
Transcriptions
- Wylie: li tang rdzong
- Tibetan Pinyin: Litang Dzong

Litang County (Tibetan: ལི་ཐང་རྫོང་།; Chinese: 理塘县) is southwest of Garzê Tibetan Autonomous Prefecture, in Sichuan, China, in the traditional Tibetan region of Kham. It contains 7 towns and a population of more than 60,000 in 2020. Due to its elevation and mountainous terrain, the county has an alpine climate. Several famous Tibetan Buddhist figures were born here, including the 7th Dalai Lama, the 10th Dalai Lama, the 11th Tai Situpa, four of the Pabalas, as well as the 5th Jamyang Zhépa of Labrang Monastery. Düsum Khyenpa, 1st Karmapa Lama, returned here and built Kampo Nénang Monastery and Pangphuk Monastery. It also has strong connections with the eponymous hero of the Epic of King Gesar.

== History ==
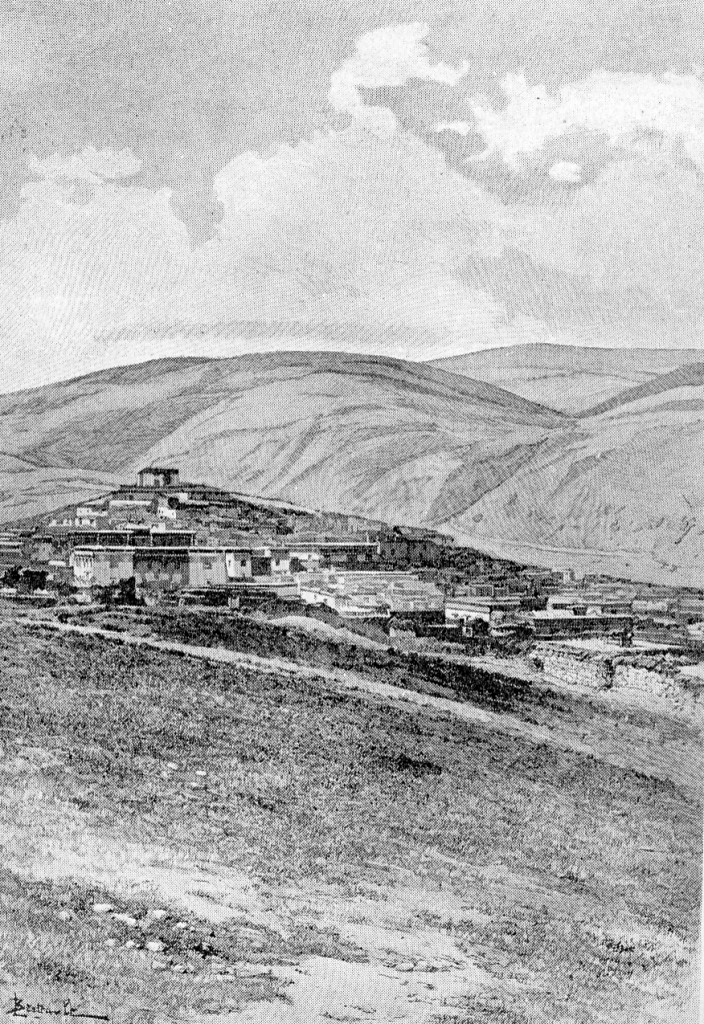
Litang Monastery and town below it in the 1840s

In 1272, the Yuan Dynasty set up Litang Zhou, later set up Ben Buer Yi Si Gang to recruit envoys, and in 1288 set up the Qianliang Office. In the Ming Dynasty, Litang Xuanfu Division was set up, and later it was Zhawudong Sima Qianhu Office; in the late Ming and early Qing Dynasties, it was the territory of Gushi Khan. In 1709, the Qing Dynasty set up a deputy camp officer, belonging to the Qinghai Daiqingheshuoqi Department. In 1719, the Qing army passed through Litang, and all the chieftains submitted their household registration to pay grain, and Litang was placed under Sichuan Province. It was made into an autonomous Tusi chiefdom. In 1729, Litang was established as the deputy Xuanfu Division, which belongs to the Arrow Furnace Hall. in 1792, the grain affairs committee was established. In 1876, the land was reformed, and Lihua County was established, and in 1906, Hue County was established. In 1908, the Lihua Hall was set up to govern Daaba (Daocheng), Dingxiang (township), Shunhua (Litang) and other counties. In 1911, it was upgraded to Baohuafu. In 1913, the government of the Republic of China established Lihua County, which was subordinate to the Chuanbian Special Administrative Region. In 1925, it was changed to Xikang Road, Xikang Province. On December 14, 1951, it was renamed Litang County.

The Lithang Monastery, known formally as Ganden Thubchen Choekhorling, was originally a temple built for the worship of Bon. In A.D. 1580 it was converted to Gelug Buddhism by the 3rd Dalai Lama. In the centuries since, Litang Monastery has been damaged and rebuilt several times.

In 1956 Chinese communists wanted to accelerate the collectivization of property and confiscate privately owned firearms but were met with local opposition. Thousands of armed Tibetans attacked and killed several Chinese during an attempt to take over the town. After Chinese reinforcements arrived, the Tibetan forces sought refuge inside the monastery along with civilians. A siege battle ensued, but even as casualties ran high on both sides, negotiations failed to resolve the conflict despite a show of force by Chinese bomber aircraft. Tibetan fighters tried to escape during the night before a full-scale Chinese assault the next morning. Losses were reported to be in the hundreds to the thousands. Many survivors later joined the Tibetan guerilla force Chushi Gandruk.

In August 2007, the Litang Horse Festival was the scene of an impromptu anti-government political speech by Runggye Adak, which was followed by protests calling for his release. A crackdown officially described as "patriotic education campaign" followed in autumn of 2007, including several politically motivated arrests and attempts to force local Tibetans to denounce the 14th Dalai Lama.

In 2013, one major temple of the Lithang Monastery burned to the ground in an accidental fire.

== Geography ==
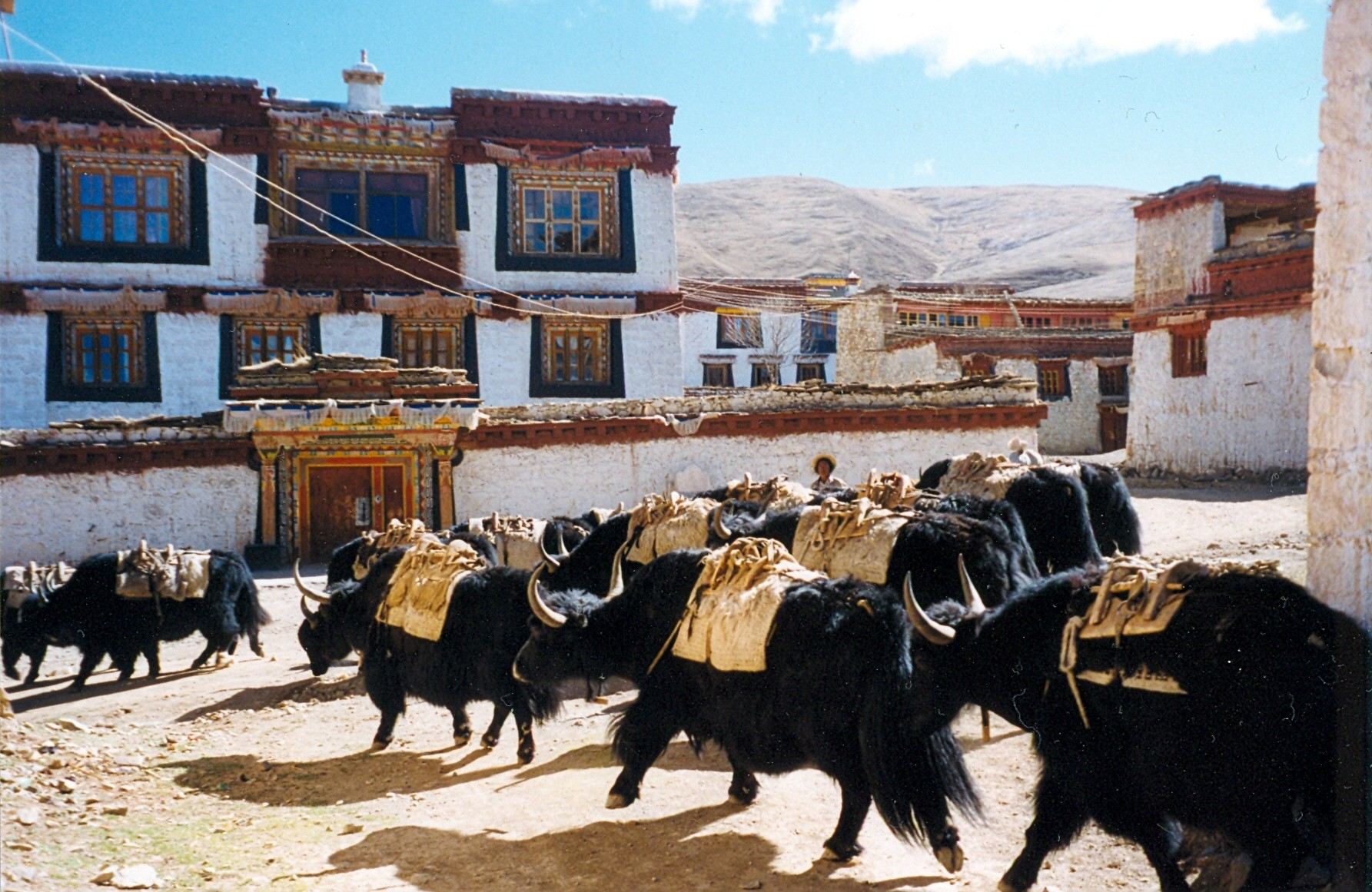
Yaks in the Ganden Thubchen Choekhorling monastery courtyard

Litang County is located in the west of Sichuan, the southwest of Garze Tibetan Autonomous Prefecture, between the Jinsha River and the Yalong River on the southeastern edge of the Qinghai-Tibet Plateau. The Shaluli Mountains runs from north to south. The terrain is dominated by hill-shaped plateaus and mountain plains. The main mountain ranges are Ge'nyen Massif with an altitude of 6,204 meters, Xiaozha Mountain (肖扎山) with an altitude of 5,807 meters, Kainmêlong Mountain (mkhan me long, 克麦隆山) with an altitude of 5,780 meters and Kuergangzhong Mountain (库尔岗中山) with an altitude of 5,601 meters. The rivers in Litang County are divided into two major river systems, the Yalong River and the Jinsha River. There are 48 rivers with a drainage area of more than 100 square kilometers. Among them, 8 rivers including Wuliang River and Reyi River flow into the Yalong River, Naqu River and Lapo River. Zhangna River three rivers into the Jinsha River. Litang Town (the seat of the county) itself is located at an altitude of 4,014 metres. It is on open grassland and surrounded by snow-capped mountains and is about 400 meters higher than Lhasa, making it one of the highest towns in the world.

Litang County has Haizi Mountain National Nature Reserve, Gemu County Nature Reserve, Xiaba Zhaga Sacred Mountain Nature Reserve, Wulianghe Provincial Wetland Park, and Zaraoxi Scenic Area. The ecological protection red line area is 7510.94 square kilometers, accounting for 52.33% of the county's total area and 10.77% of the state's ecological red line area. There are China's national second-class protected vegetable oil barley spruce and long-bud fir, and China's first-class protected animals include white-lipped deer, forest musk deer, horse musk deer, leopard, snow leopard, Chinese merganser duck, golden eagle, jade belt sea eagle, bearded vulture, bar-tailed Hazel Chicken, Sichuan Pheasant. China's second-class protected animals include macaques, Asian black bears, otters, lynx, golden cats, sambar, Tibetan gazelle, goral, blue sheep, argali, grassland eagle, and Tibetan horse chicken.

The soils in Litang County are mainly alpine meadow soil, dark brown soil and alpine shrub meadow soil. There are 9 types and 13 sub-types. The forest area is 18,375.73 hectares, the county's forest coverage rate is 7.4%, the standing wood volume is 51,391,343 cubic meters, the main tree species are fir and spruce, the total area of natural grassland is 823,847 hectares (2,035,770 acres), the usable area is 659,440 hectares (1,629,500 acres) and the main forage species are There are alpine pine grass, Sichuan pine grass, black flower moss grass and so on.

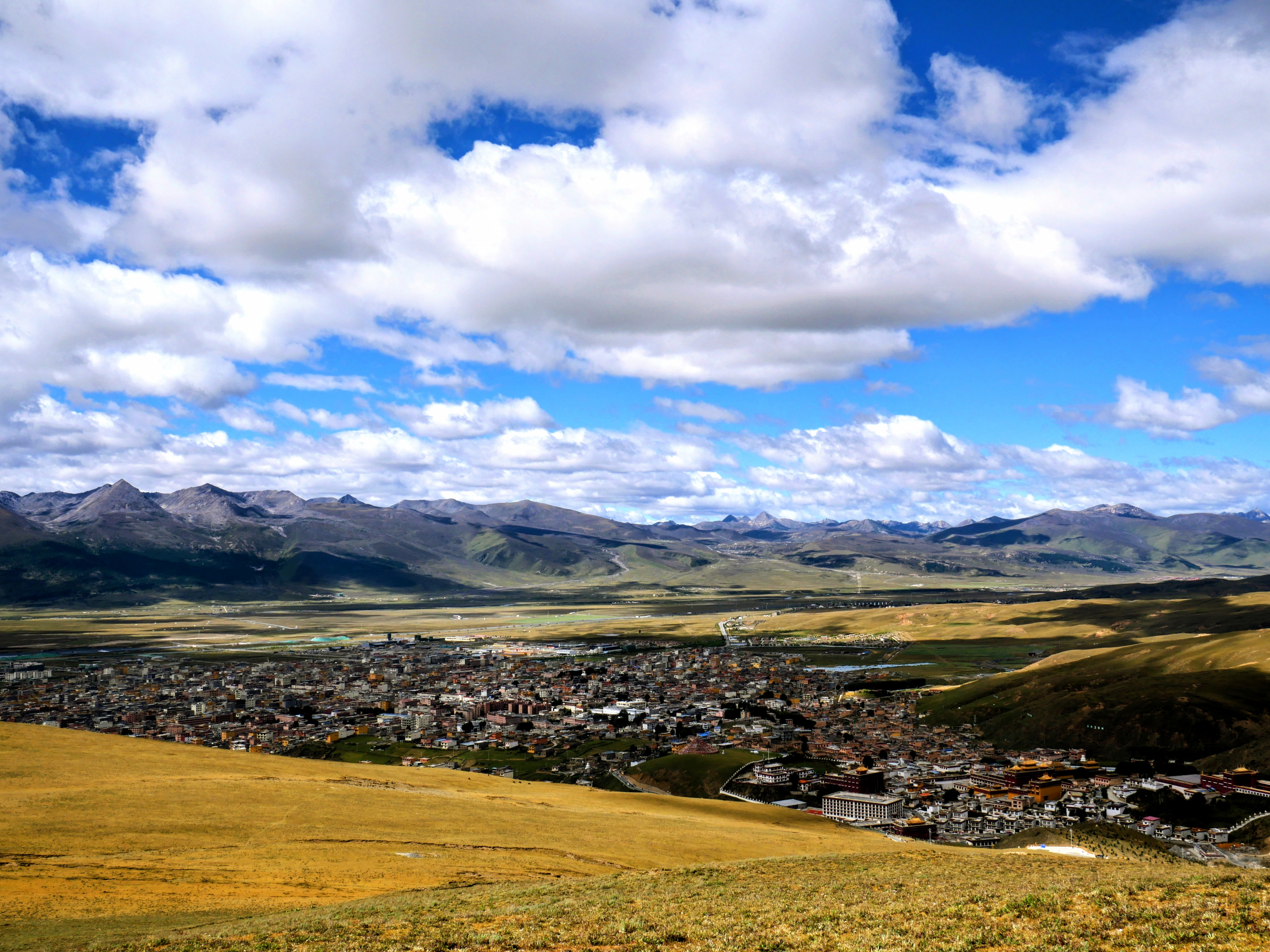
Panoramic view of the city

== Climate ==
With an elevation of nearly 4,000 metres (13,000 ft), Litang has an alpine subarctic climate (Köppen Dwc), with long, cold, dry winters, and short, cool summers with very frequent rain. The monthly 24-hour average temperature ranges from −4.9 °C (23.2 °F) in January to only 11.0 °C (51.8 °F) in July; the annual mean is 3.65 °C (38.6 °F). Over 80% of the 765 mm (30.1 in) of annual precipitation is delivered from June to September. With monthly percent possible sunshine ranging from 38% in July to 83% in December, the county seat receives 2,643 hours of bright sunshine annually, with winter by far the sunniest season.

Climate data for Litang, elevation 3,949 m (12,956 ft), (1991–2020 normals, extremes 1952–present)
Month	Jan	Feb	Mar	Apr	May	Jun	Jul	Aug	Sep	Oct	Nov	Dec	Year
Record high °C (°F)	17.4 (63.3)	17.1 (62.8)	21.6 (70.9)	27.7 (81.9)	25.1 (77.2)	26.1 (79.0)	28.1 (82.6)	29.1 (84.4)	25.1 (77.2)	20.5 (68.9)	17.4 (63.3)	16.9 (62.4)	29.1 (84.4)
Mean daily maximum °C (°F)	4.4 (39.9)	6.0 (42.8)	8.3 (46.9)	11.5 (52.7)	15.4 (59.7)	17.7 (63.9)	17.4 (63.3)	17.2 (63.0)	16.0 (60.8)	12.8 (55.0)	8.5 (47.3)	5.7 (42.3)	11.7 (53.1)
Daily mean °C (°F)	−4.4 (24.1)	−2.4 (27.7)	0.4 (32.7)	4.1 (39.4)	8.3 (46.9)	11.0 (51.8)	11.3 (52.3)	10.9 (51.6)	9.4 (48.9)	5.4 (41.7)	−0.1 (31.8)	−3.6 (25.5)	4.2 (39.5)
Mean daily minimum °C (°F)	−11.4 (11.5)	−9.2 (15.4)	−5.6 (21.9)	−1.9 (28.6)	2.4 (36.3)	6.3 (43.3)	7.2 (45.0)	6.9 (44.4)	5.1 (41.2)	0.2 (32.4)	−6.5 (20.3)	−10.7 (12.7)	−1.4 (29.4)
Record low °C (°F)	−27.2 (−17.0)	−25.8 (−14.4)	−18.9 (−2.0)	−15.2 (4.6)	−8.8 (16.2)	−3.7 (25.3)	−2.0 (28.4)	−2.5 (27.5)	−5.8 (21.6)	−15.8 (3.6)	−20.2 (−4.4)	−30.6 (−23.1)	−30.6 (−23.1)
Average precipitation mm (inches)	1.5 (0.06)	4.8 (0.19)	13.1 (0.52)	29.9 (1.18)	58.5 (2.30)	146.0 (5.75)	194.9 (7.67)	161.2 (6.35)	118.2 (4.65)	31.6 (1.24)	7.4 (0.29)	1.8 (0.07)	768.9 (30.27)
Average precipitation days (≥ 0.1 mm)	2.1	4.1	8.0	11.9	14.2	20.7	24.6	22.8	20.1	9.8	4.4	2.2	144.9
Average snowy days	4.5	7.8	14.1	15.8	7.2	0.9	0.1	0.3	1.3	8.3	6.7	3.9	70.9
Average relative humidity (%)	38	42	48	52	55	66	73	73	71	60	49	41	56
Mean monthly sunshine hours	259.7	231.8	248.4	228.2	235.1	186.4	161.9	168.3	177.7	233.4	251.0	261.0	2,642.9
Percentage possible sunshine	81	74	67	59	56	45	38	41	48	66	79	83	60
Source 1: China Meteorological Administrationextremes
Source 2: Weather China

== Administrative divisions ==
Litang County administers 7 towns and 15 townships. The seat of the county is Litang Town (officially: Gaocheng), which is located at an altitude of 4,014 metres. It is on open grassland and surrounded by snow-capped mountains and is about 400 meters higher than Lhasa, making it one of the highest towns in the world.

Name	Simplified Chinese	Hanyu Pinyin	Tibetan	Wylie	Administrative division code
Towns
Tochong Town (Gaocheng, Litang)	高城镇	Gāochéng Zhèn	མཐོ་གྲོང་གྲོང་རྡལ།	mtho grong grong rdal	513334100
Jawa Town (Jiawa)	甲洼镇	Jiǎwā Zhèn	འཇའ་བ་གྲོང་རྡལ།	ʼjaʼ ba grong rdal	513334101
Gê'nyên Town (Genie)	格聂镇	Géniè Zhèn	དགེ་བསྙེན་གྲོང་རྡལ།	dge bsnyen grong rdal	513334102
Mola Town (Mora, Mula)	木拉镇	Mùlā Zhèn	མོ་ལ་གྲོང་རྡལ།	mo la grong rdal	513334103
Kyongba Town (Junba)	君坝镇	Jūnbà Zhèn	གྱོང་པ་གྲོང་རྡལ།	gyong pa grong rdal	513334104
Nabo Town (Labo)	拉波镇	Lābō Zhèn	སྣ་པོ་གྲོང་རྡལ།	sna po grong rdal	513334105
Qowo Town (Juewu)	觉吾镇	Juéwú Zhèn	ཇོ་བོ་གྲོང་རྡལ།	jo bo grong rdal	513334106
Townships
Lhayü Township (Hayi)	哈依乡	Hāyī Xiāng	ལྷ་ཡུལ་ཤང་།	lha yul shang	513334201
Boba Township (Moba)	莫坝乡	Mòbà Xiāng	འབོ་པ་ཤང་།	'bo pa shang	513334203
Yarxog Township (Yahuo)	亚火乡	Yàhuǒ Xiāng	ཡར་ཤོག་ཤང་།	yar shog shang	513334203
Rongba Township	绒坝乡	Róngbà Xiāng	རོང་པ་ཤང་།	rong pa shang	513334205
Gawa Township	呷洼乡	Gāwā Xiāng	དགའ་བ་ཤང་།	dga' ba shang	513334206
Boingor Township (Benge)	奔戈乡	Bēngē Xiāng	དཔོན་སྒོར་ཤང་།	dpon sgor shang	513334207
Cêngoin Township (Cunnge)	村戈乡	Cūngē Xiāng	ཚེ་མགོན་ཤང་།	tshe mgon shang	513334208
Hornying Township (Heni)	禾尼乡	Héní Xiāng	ཧོ་སྙིང་ཤང་།	ho snying shang	513334209
Qoidên Township (Qudeng)	曲登乡	Qǔdēng Xiāng	མཆོད་རྟེན་ཤང་།	mchod rten shang	513334210
Mola Doiba Township (Shangmula)	上木拉乡	Shàngmùlā Xiāng	མོ་ལ་སྟོད་པ་ཤང་།	mo la stod pa shang	513334213
Cosum Township (Zhuosang)	濯桑乡	Zhuósāng Xiāng	ཚོ་གསུམ་ཤང་།	tsho gsum shang	513334216
Zamba Township (Zangba)	藏坝乡	Zàngbà Xiāng	འཛམ་པ་ཤང་།	'dzam pa shang	513334218
Kêmo Township (Kaimo, Gemu)	格木乡	Gémù Xiāng	གེ་མོ་ཤང་།	ge mo shang	513334219
Mawa Township (Mêwa, Maiwa)	麦洼乡	Màiwā Xiāng	དམའ་བ་ཤང་།	dma' ba shang	513334221
Dêwang Township (Dêwo, Dewu)	德巫乡	Déwū Xiāng	བདེ་དབང་ཤང་།	bde dbang shang	513334222

== Social ==
According to China's seventh national census in 2020, Litang County has a total population of 67,293 people, of which 51.56% are male and 48.44% are female, with a sex ratio of 106.42. 27.8% were aged 0–14, 63.44% were aged 14–59, 8.76% were aged over 60, and 6.18% were aged over 65. University education accounted for 8.603%, high school education accounted for 4.714%, junior high school education accounted for 10.05%, and primary school education accounted for 38.335%.

In 2021, the resident population of Litang County is 74,740, of which the registered population is 68,202. The urbanization rate is 39.19%. Most of them are Tibetans, and there are Han, Mongolian, Hui, Naxi, Tujia, Yi, Miao and Qiang nationalities, Litang people traditionally live on herding, and the tourism industry has gradually developed since the reform and opening up.

In 2020, the GDP of Litang County will reach 1.96275 billion yuan, the industrial added value will be 137.57 million yuan, the total investment in fixed assets of the whole society will be 1.21468 billion yuan, the total retail sales of consumer goods will be 843.62 million yuan, and the per capita disposable income of urban residents will be 39,343 yuan; the per capita disposable income of rural residents is 13,009 yuan. On February 18, 2020, the Sichuan Provincial Government approved the withdrawal of Litang County from poverty-stricken counties.

== Transport ==
- China National Highway 318

== Notable persons ==
- Lobsang Jigme Thubten Chökyi Nyima, the 6th Jamyang Zhepa
- Gompo Tashi Andrugtsang, leader of Chushi Gangdruk
- Pagbalha Geleg Namgyai, Chinese politician
- Runggye Adak, Tibetan activist
- Tenzing Tsondu, Internet celebrity
