= Takna Jigme Sangpo =

Tibetan political prisoner (1926–2020)

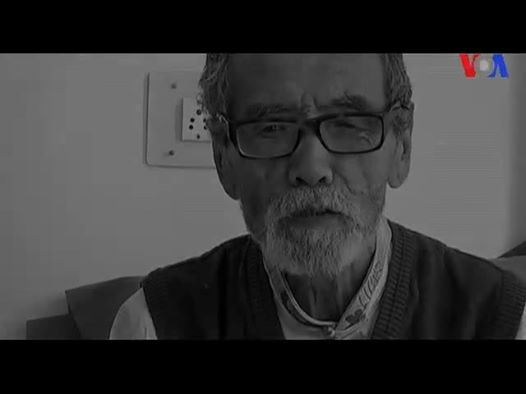
- Born: 1926; Tibet
- Died: 17 October 2020 (aged 94); Turbenthal, Switzerland
- Occupation: Teacher

Takna Jigme Sangpo (Tibetan: སྟག་སྣ་འཇིགས་མེད་བཟང་པོ, Wylie: stag sna 'jigs med bzang po; 1926 – 17 October 2020) was the longest-serving political prisoner of Tibetan ethnicity, having spent 37 years in a prison near Lhasa.

== Life ==
First imprisoned in 1965, he was released from prison on a medical parole on 31 March 2002 having reached the age of 76. He resided in the Drapchi Prison.

He was first sentenced to three years of "re-education through labour" in 1965 because, as a schoolteacher (became a teacher in 1952), he had "corrupted the minds of children with reactionary ideas". He served a further ten-year sentence from 1970 as punishment for "political activities". In 1983 he received a 15-year sentence and five years' deprivation of civil and political rights for "spreading and inciting counter-revolutionary propaganda" after he had been seen pasting a personally written wall poster at the gates of the Jokhang temple in Lhasa on 12 July 1983. That sentence was increased by five years after he shouted "reactionary slogans" in Drapchi on 1 December 1988.

On 6 December 1991, he was reportedly beaten, held in solitary confinement for six weeks, and his sentence extended by eight years for shouting "Free Tibet" during a visit to Drapchi prison by the Swiss ambassador to China. Following his involvement in protests at Drapchi prison on 1 May 1998 until 4 May 1998, he was held in solitary confinement.

Even while imprisoned, he continued to protest for a free Tibet, for which he was given additional prison sentences of many years. Despite his advanced age and years in prison, he continued to encourage his fellow Tibetans in their struggle for freedom. An April 2002 report described him as "one of the most determined and intransigent political prisoners in Drapchi ... highly respected by other political prisoners". John Kamm, director of the Dui Hua Foundation, has been involved in negotiations for Sangpo's release.

Sangpo was released on 31 March 2002, and was authorized to go to Washington on 13 July 2002. In August 2002, he settled in Switzerland as a political refugee. He was invited to speak at the UN Council on 6 June 2008. Sangpo is listed in the US Congressional Executive Commission On China Political Prisoner Database (PPD). Gu Chu Sum Movement of Tibet, an ex-political prisoners organisation, in McLeod Ganj published his biography on 24 January 2014.
