= Runggye Adak =

Tibetan man

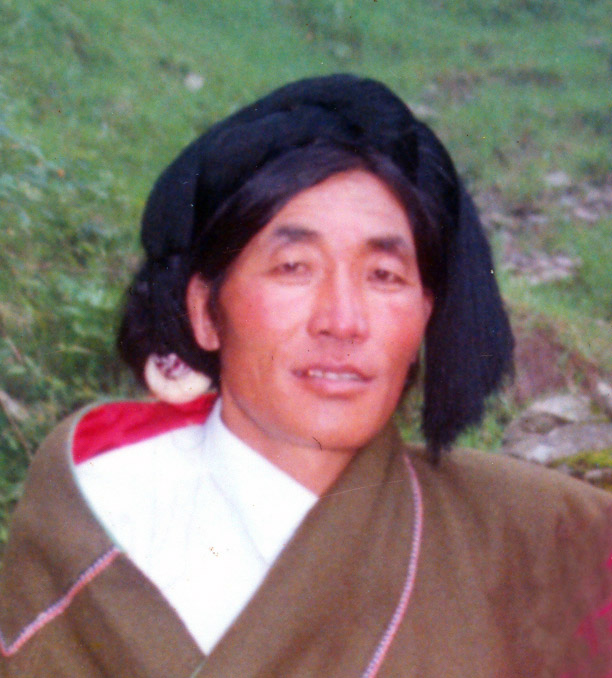
Runggye Adak in Lithang

Runggye Adak (also Rongye Adak, Runggye Adrak, etc.) is a Tibetan man who was arrested and charged with state subversion against the People's Republic of China after making a series of public political statements at a festival in eastern Tibet, on August 1, 2007.

Runggye Adak, said to be a respected local figure and the father of eleven, is a native of Yonru Kharshul, a village near Lithang in the predominantly Tibetan region of Kham. He seized the microphone during a speech at a horse-racing festival in Lithang, and proceeded to call for the return of the Dalai Lama and the release of Gedhun Choekyi Nyima, the present Dalai Lama's candidate for Panchen Lama, and of Tenzin Delek, a lama from Lithang who was sentenced to life in prison for alleged involvement in terrorism, and the independence of Tibet. Runggye Adak was detained shortly thereafter. A spontaneous protest of local people demanding his release lasted several days before being dispersed under threat by riot police.

The Associated Press reported that scores of people were arrested in the aftermath of Runggye Adak's protest. Three of Runggye Adak's nephews were arrested, with police attention focusing on Adruk Lopoe, a monk at Lithang Monastery.

On August 27, prosecutors charged Runggye Adak with "provocation to subvert state power." On 29 October 2007 he was indicted by the Kardze Intermediate People's Court on four counts of 'crimes' ranging from disruption of law and order to state subversion and subsequently (on 20 November) sentenced to eight years of imprisonment with deprivation of political rights for four years. He was released in July 2015 after serving his sentence in full.

== See also ==
- Political prisoners
