= Phuntsog Nyidron =

Tibetan Buddhist nun and former political prisoner

Phuntsog Nyidron (born 1969) is a Tibetan Buddhist nun and a former high-profile prisoner in Tibet. In 1989, she and eight other nuns traveled from her hometown to the provincial capital of Lhasa when it was convulsed by Tibetan independence protests and riots, and handed out leaflets and shouted anti-Chinese slogans. She was tried and imprisoned for the charge of counterrevolutionary propaganda and incitement and imprisoned at the Drapchi Prison that same year. During her incarceration, she produced and smuggled out tapes of her and other prisoners' political songs, engaged in hunger strikes, and made publicized allegations of mistreatment. One of the better-known Tibetan prisoners outside Tibet, she was the subject of a release campaign by several United States Congress parliamentarians and governmental groups. Because of their efforts, and Chinese wishes to improve Sino-American relations, her sentence was reduced and commuted in 2004. She lives in Switzerland since 2006.

== Biography ==
Phuntsog Nyidron was born in Phenpo near Lhasa, Tibet Autonomous Region, People's Republic of China in 1969. She did not attend school, enrolling in the Michungri Nunnery at age 18, and becoming the semiofficial leader of the nunnery. During the holiday of Losar in 1989, the year where the 14th Dalai Lama won the Nobel Peace Prize, she traveled with eight other nuns to the capital, Lhasa, while it was under martial law because of the 1989 Tibetan unrest. Against the advice of the Lhasans her group spoke to, she and three other nuns split with the main group, went to the Barkhor area around Jokhang Temple, and distributed leaflets and shouted slogans such as "Chinese get out of Tibet" and "Long Live Dalai Lama". They were arrested by local Tibetan police and sentenced to nine years' imprisonment by the Lhasa Intermediate People's Court for "counterrevolutionary propaganda and incitement". In 1993 while still in prison, she secretly recorded and smuggled out songs with some other prisoners that praised the Dalai Lama and demanded an independent Tibet, for which she was again convicted of counterrevolutionary propaganda and incitement and her sentence extended for eight more years. For the remainder of her time in Drapchi Prison, she did other political actions such as hunger strikes, and made allegations of corporal punishment and other mistreatment in prison.

The Prison Law of the People's Republic of China was amended in 1994 to address such abuses. Her sentence was reduced one year in 2001, and commuted completely in 2004, following calls and visits from groups like the United States Commission on International Religious Freedom and several United States parliamentarians. The Chinese government, "taking account the strong views of the Bush administration", released her for better relations with the United States, and to signal an increased willingness to talk with the Dalai Lama. She was the last of the 14 "Singing Nuns", named as such by the media for their 1993 album that was released from prison. In 2006, she was granted permission to leave for the United States for medical treatment. She subsequently moved to Switzerland, successfully applying for political asylum.
