= El-Baz =

El-Baz, Elbaz
- Pronunciation: Arabic pronunciation: [elˈbæːz]

Origin
- Language: Arabic
- Meaning: "the hawk"

El-Baz (Arabic: الباز, Hebrew: אלבז, also spelled Elbaz, Al-Baz, El Baze, Albaz or ElBez (Arabic pronunciation: [elˈbæːz]) is an Arabic surname, meaning "the hawk" or "the falcon" ("Baz" refers to the goshawk in Arabic, and to a falcon or kestrel in Hebrew).

== Notable people ==
- Abdul Aziz bin Abdullah bin Baz (Arabic: عبد العزيز بن عبد الله بن باز; 1910–1999), Saudi Arabian Salafi or Wahhabi Islamic scholar
- Farouk El-Baz (Arabic: فاروق الباز; born 1938), Egyptian-American scientist
- Osama El-Baz (Arabic: أسامة الباز; born 1931), Egyptian diplomat
- Rania al-Baz, Saudi Arabian television presenter and domestic abuse victim

=== Elbaz ===
- Alber Elbaz (1961–2021), Moroccan-Israeli fashion designer
- André Elbaz (born 1934), Moroccan painter and filmmaker
- Cheb i Sabbah (1947–2013), born Haim Serge El-Baz, Algerian club DJ
- David Elbaz (born 1966), French astrophysicist and author
- Gad Elbaz (born 1982), Israeli haredi singer
- Gil Elbaz, American entrepreneur, founder of AdSense
- Nathan Elbaz (1932–1954), Israel Defense Forces soldier
- Stéphanie Elbaz, French pianist
- Vincent Elbaz (born 1971), French actor

== See also ==
- Baz (disambiguation)
- Albats
