= Altruistic suicide =

Sacrifice of one's life for the benefit of others

Altruistic suicide is the sacrifice of one's life for a perceived benefit to another person or a group of people, or for the preservation of traditions and honor in their society. It is always intentional. Benevolent suicide refers to the self-sacrifice of one's own life for the sake of the greater good. Such a sacrifice may be performed for the sake of executing a particular action, or for the sake of keeping a natural balance in the society.

Altruistic suicide was described by Émile Durkheim in his book Suicide: A Study In Sociology and occurs when social values and interests overwhelm the individual's interest in self-preservation. Altruistic suicide is one of four categories of suicide described by Durkheim, alongside egoistic suicide, fatalistic suicide, and anomic suicide.

In contrast, a "sacrifice" which is committed by the force of a state is referred to as eugenics or mass murder, but may be otherwise referred to as "enforced population limits" or "population control". In literature, examples may promote the concept as a means for ending enduring types of social conflict, or else deride the concept as an example of a dystopian future society.

== Rituals ==
Not all forms of suicide are viewed as a tragedy by the society in which they occur. Sociologists and anthropologists have observed that ritual suicide can be accepted or even expected in many cultures. For instance, the anthropologist Mary Douglas discusses a practice of the Dinka people in which divine leaders, known as Masters of the Fishing Spear, are buried alive in a ritual which allows their society to reconcile and even assert control over the inevitability of death.

An obligation to commit ritual suicide can also function to enforce certain cultural values or social roles. Japanese samurai practiced a form of ritual suicide called seppuku in which a warrior cuts open their own abdomen after experiencing martial disgrace. This practice may also serve the individual's own interests either by preserving the warrior's honor or preventing retribution by victorious opponents. Widows in India and Japan have committed acts of ritual suicide after the death of a husband, although these practices are now abandoned and often illegal. The Indian practice of widow suicide, called sati, typically occurs when the widow lies down or casts herself upon her husband’s funeral pyre in an act of ritual self-immolation. The elderly members of certain cultures intentionally ended their lives, in what is termed as senicide. In hunter-gatherer societies, death "was determined for the elderly ... normally characterized by a liminal period and ceremonies in which the old person was transferred from the present world to the next."

Durkheim also observes that altruistic suicide is unlikely to occur much in contemporary Western society where "individual personality is increasingly freed from the collective personality". Altruistic suicide has been described as an evolutionarily stable strategy. Altruistic suicide has a long history in India, even being noted in the Dharmashastras. Some perceive self-immolation as an altruistic or "worthy" suicide.

== Emergencies ==
In contemporary Western society, this is seldom referred to as suicide, and most often referred to as an act of heroism. This only exists in times of emergency, and is always lauded, and is perceived as a tragic death.

Self-sacrificial acts of heroism, such as falling on a grenade, are one example. Intentionally remaining on the deck of a sinking ship to leave room in the life rafts, intentionally ending one's life to preserve the resources of a group in the face of deprivation (such as the actions of Lawrence Oates in Antarctica in 1912), and the like are suicidal acts of heroism. Firefighters, law-enforcement individuals, undercover agents, sailors, and soldiers more often are at risk of opportunities for this form of unplanned self-sacrifice. These are all a result of tragic, life-threatening emergencies. It is only an emergency measure, a voluntary but unwanted end to the person's life. It is never a result of long-term planned action, yet may involve some short-term planning. Examples of this include Vince Coleman, a telegraph operator who saved hundreds of lives by sending out a warning about an imminent explosion.

== Protests ==
=== Ireland ===
Bobby Sands, an officer of the Irish Republican Army, died after 66 days of hunger striking while imprisoned. The strike was part of a larger set of 1981 protests by Irish prisoners which centered on 5 demands: the right not to wear a prison uniform; the right not to do prison work, the right of free association with other prisoners, and to organise educational and recreational pursuits, the right to one visit, one letter, and one parcel per week, and full restoration of remission lost through the protest.

=== Thailand ===
Nuamthong Praiwan, a taxi driver who attempted suicide, drove his taxi into a tank in protest after the military coup of 2006. He was later found hanging from a pedestrian footbridge. Officials found a suicide note and later ruled his death a suicide.

In 2020, Khanakorn Pianchana, a Thai judge, committed suicide to protest the Thai justice system. He made a suicide attempt in October 2019, when he shot himself in the chest with a pistol in the Yala province court, after he acquitted five men on murder and firearms charges due to lack of evidence and reading a short statement, in order to protest against interference in the justice system. He died in a second attempt in March 2020, after being subject to investigations following his actions.

=== Tibet ===
As of May 2022, 160 monks, nuns, and ordinary people have self-immolated in Tibet as a form of protest since 27 February 2009, when Tapey, a young monk from Kirti Monastery, set himself on fire in the marketplace in Ngawa City, Ngawa County, Sichuan. According to the International Campaign for Tibet (ICT), "Chinese police have beaten, shot, isolated, and disappeared self-immolators who survived."

=== Tunisia ===
Tarek el-Tayeb Mohamed Bouazizi was a Tunisian street vendor who set himself on fire on 17 December 2010 in Sidi Bouzid, Tunisia, an act which became a catalyst for the Tunisian revolution and the wider Arab Spring against autocratic regimes. His self-immolation was in response to the confiscation of his wares and the harassment and humiliation inflicted on him by a municipal official and her aides.

=== United States of America ===
Norman Morrison was an American anti-war activist. On November 2, 1965, Morrison doused himself in kerosene and set himself on fire below the office of Secretary of Defense Robert McNamara at the Pentagon to protest United States involvement in the Vietnam War. North Vietnam named a Hanoi street after him, and issued a postage stamp in his honor. Instead of increasing anti-war sentiment, much of the attention this act received in the West focused on speculating why Morrison brought his infant daughter along. This may be because public suicides in the West tend to be viewed through the same lens as other forms of suicide attributed to causes such as psychiatric disorder, instead of as a form of protest, perhaps due to Christian values historically associated with these cultures.

On April 22, 2022, climate activist Wynn Alan Bruce set himself on fire in the plaza of the United States Supreme Court Building in Washington, D.C. The fatal self-immolation, which took place on Earth Day, was characterized by Bruce's friends and his father as a protest against the climate crisis.

On February 25, 2024, American serviceman Aaron Bushnell died after lighting himself on fire outside the Israeli embassy in Washington, D.C., to protest the Israeli government's genocide in the Gaza war and his own government's support of Israel.

=== Vietnam ===
In 1963, Vietnamese monk Thich Quang Duc committed altruistic suicide through the means of self-immolation. He did this to protest the treatment of Buddhist practicing peoples by the South Vietnamese government.

== See also ==
- Advocacy of suicide
- Altruism
- Autothysis
- Cadmean victory
- Half a Life (Star Trek: The Next Generation)
- HMS Birkenhead (1845)
- Human shield
- Jauhar
- Martyr
- Pyrrhic victory
- Revolutionary Suicide
- Self-denial
- Self-sacrifice in Jewish law
- Utilitarianism
