= Baz (name) =

Baz is a surname, given name and nickname, often a short form (hypocorism) of Basil or Barry in English. Origins vary depending on language. It may refer to:

== People ==
=== Surname ===
- Ben-Hur Baz (1906–2003), Mexican painter of pin-up art
- Cristian Baz (born 1987), Argentine footballer
- Gustavo Baz Prada (1894–1987), Mexican politician
- Ignacio Baz (1826–1887), Argentine portrait painter
- Jamil Baz, chief investment strategist of GLG Partners, a London-based hedge fund, and economics professor
- Loris Baz (born 1993), French motorcycle racer
- Marysole Wörner Baz (1936–2014), Mexican painter and sculptor
- Molly Baz, American chef and food writer
- Nabil Baz (born 1987), Algerian racing cyclist
- Shane Baz (born 1999), American baseball player
- Rashid Baz, perpetrator of the 1994 Brooklyn Bridge shooting

=== Given name ===
- Baz Mohammad Ahmadi (fl. 2007–2009), Deputy Minister of Interior for Counter-Narcotics and former Governor of Badakhshan, Afghanistan
- Baz Bamigboye, British journalist
- Baz Muhammad Khan (fl. 1988–present), Pakistani politician
- Baz Moffat (born 1978), British female rower

=== Nickname ===
- Basil Zempilas (born 1971), Western Australian Opposition Leader, Leader of the Liberal Party of WA, Former Lord Mayor of Perth
- Baz Ashmawy (born 1975), Irish television personality
- Sebastian Bach (born 1968), Canadian heavy metal singer
- Baz Bastien (1919–1983), Canadian National Hockey League goaltender, head coach and general manager
- Barry Du Bois (born 1960), Australian designer, building expert, television presenter and author
- Baz Luhrmann (born 1962), Australian filmmaker
- Brendon McCullum (born 1981), New Zealand cricketer
- Baz Nagle (1933–1997), Canadian Football League player
- Barry North (born 1959), British Royal Air Force air marshal
- Basil O'Meara (1892–1971), Canadian sports journalist
- Barry Thomson, guitarist and co-founder of the British death metal band Bolt Thrower
- Baz Warne (born 1964), lead and bass guitarist and vocalist of the punk rock band The Stranglers

== Fictional characters ==
- Baz Pitch, in the novel Carry On by Rainbow Rowell, boyfriend to Simon Snow
- Simon Baz, a DC Comics character
- Barbara "Baz" Wilder, a former character on the British TV series Casualty
- The Baz, a recurring character in Divekick and other kickstarter indie games

== See also ==
- Barrington Patterson (1965–2022), English kickboxer and mixed martial artist nicknamed "One Eye Baz"
- Mar Narsai D'Baz (1940–2010), Metropolitan of Lebanon, Syria and all Europe in the Assyrian Church of the East
- El-Baz, an Arabic surname and, as Elbaz, a Hebrew surname
