= Phuntsog self-immolation incident =

2011 protest act

The Phuntsog self-immolation incident (Chinese: 彭措自焚事件) occurred when a Tibetan Buddhist monk by the name of Rigzin Phuntsog immolated himself on March 16, 2011 in Ngawa County, Ngawa Tibetan and Qiang Autonomous Prefecture, Sichuan province, People's Republic of China. This was followed by another self-immolation incident on September 26, 2011. By March 2012, more than thirty other Tibetans had immolated themselves as a protest against Chinese rule of Tibet.

== March incident ==
=== Self-immolation ===
On the afternoon of March 16, Rigzin Phuntsog (Chinese: 仁增彭措), a 16-year-old monk at Kirti monastery set himself on fire. He was sent to the hospital, but a group of monks hid him inside the monastery until after his death. After long hours of negotiations Phuntsog's mother finally took him to the hospital.

=== Controversy over circumstances surrounding Phuntsog's death ===
The death of the monk is reported differently. Radio Free Asia and International Campaign for Tibet quoted local Tibetans who said the police put out the fire and then beat the monk to death. According to Time and accounts of people from the monastery, police and plain clothes officers turned up and extinguished the fire within 15 minutes and beat and kicked the monk. According to Xinhua News Agency the death was due to delayed treatment as the monks prevented Phuntsog from going to the hospital.

Phuntsog was reported to be 16 years old. Radio Free Asia gave a different name and age, saying the monk's name is Lobsang Phuntsog, aged 21. Other sources have also reported Phuntsog to be 24 years old.

=== Aftermath ===
A demonstration protest took place near the scene of the incident with nearly 1,000 monks shouting slogans. In Dharamshala another demonstration took place with about 500 people present. Three monks were sentenced to prison for helping Phuntsog with the immolation; their sentences were 10, 11 and 13 years. One of the monks was Phuntsog's uncle.

== September incident ==
=== Self-immolation ===
Two more monks, Lobsang Kalsang, aged 18, and Lobsang Konchok, aged 19, set themselves on fire on September 26. Lobsang Kalsang is the brother of Rigzin Phuntsog. Advocacy groups said the two monks called for religious freedom and shouted "Long live Dalai Lama" before self-immolation. The incident occurred at Kirti Monastery in the Ngawa region.

=== Aftermath ===
Tibetan settlers in the Chandragiri area of Gajapati district launched a three-day-long protest against the actions of the Chinese towards Tibetans on October 19, 2011. Mass prayers and fasting were organized by different Tibetan local groups.

== See also ==
- Self-immolation in China
