= Linda George discography =

Discography of Assyrian musician Linda George

- Studio albums: 16
- EPs: 1
- Live albums: 1
- Compilation albums: 3
- Singles: 11

Since being discovered by Sargon Gabriel in the 1980s, Linda George (Syriac: ܠܢܕܐ ܓ̰ܘܪܓ̰) has become one of the most popular singers in modern Assyrian folk/pop music. She continues to actively perform at concerts and other spaces in the Assyrian community, with her first album being released in 1983 and her latest single being released in 2024.

George's songs are predominantly in Assyrian Neo-Aramaic. She has also sung in Turoyo and occasionally in Arabic. Moreover, she has written the lyrics for many of her songs.

== Albums ==
=== Studio albums ===
Hal Eiman (1983)
No.	Title	Lyrics	Music	Length
1.	"Hal Eman"	Odette George Bazi	William Nisan	4:26
2.	"Sankhero"	Linda George	William Nisan	4:07
3.	"Chicago"	Odette George Bazi	William Nisan	3:05
4.	"Marqidly"	Nashat Younan	William Nisan	3:50
5.	"Nishra D'Atour"	Linda George	William Nisan	3:25
6.	"La Khashwit Min Barokh"	Nashat Younan	William Nisan	4:34
7.	"Tarah D'Virokh"	Linda George	William Nisan	3:48
8.	"Tom Tom"	Assyrian Folk	William Nisan	4:53

Kursia D Malkoota (1984)
No.	Title	Lyrics	Music	Length
1.	"Kursia D'Malkoota"	Linda George	Rosson Bet Yonan	5:30
2.	"Qissat D'Khoubbi"	Linda George	Rosson Bet Yonan	5:10
3.	"Yala O Brata"	Linda George	Rosson Bet Yonan	3:18
4.	"Takhretly Khabiwee"	Linda George	Robert Noghli	3:11
5.	"Itkhae D'Khoubban (Tascan Tascan)"	Odette George Bazi	Rosson Bet Yonan	4:04
6.	"Gishra Shmita"	Nashat Younan	Rosson Bet Yonan	6:12
7.	"Khooba B'Da Doonyeh"	Shamasha Ninous Shmoul	Rosson Bet Yonan, Sargon Yonan	4:11
8.	"De Bkhemoon Ally"	Ishaya Ilisha Khinoo	Rosson Bet Yonan, Robert Noghli	3:55

Melodies From North of My Country (1986)
No.	Title	Lyrics	Music	Length
1.	"Jnanta D Yemma"	Yatron Darmo	Ashoor Baba	7:07
2.	"Moukhebey Kheshaeleh"	Yatron Darmo	Ashoor Baba	4:19
3.	"Goothey / Golshaynea"	Odette George Bazi	Ashoor Baba	7:55
4.	"Trea Zogeh D'Yoneh"		Ashoor Baba	4:46
5.	"Asheeta"	Linda George	Ashoor Baba	5:36
6.	"Odisho"		Ashoor Baba	5:07
7.	"Taliboota (ft. Sargon Gabriel)"		Ashoor Baba	6:30
8.	"Khiapta D'Khitna"		Ashoor Baba	4:17
9.	"Shaikhanea"	Shamasha Ninos	Ashoor Baba	3:33
10.	"Gooleh"		Ashoor Baba	3:07
11.	"Hay Moyalan / Ma Minneh"	Odette George Bazi	Ashoor Baba	8:16
12.	"Bailim"		Ashoor Baba	9:04

Warda Bil Drananeh D-Khubba (1988)
No.	Title	Lyrics	Music	Length
1.	"Atooraya"	Orahim Lazar	Ashoor Baba	4:28
2.	"Ida D Khobba"	Linda George	Linda George	8:08
3.	"La Bassa"	Odette George Bazi	Ashoor Baba	3:52
4.	"Zabnanet Warde"	Orahim Lazar	William Nisan	3:35
5.	"Shlama"	Niemo Marcus		4:28
6.	"Bel Drananet Khobba"	Wilson Davidson		5:25
7.	"Katra D Khayota"	Ninos Shmouel		2:58
8.	"Ilana"	Anwar Hawil		3:30
9.	"Khzeta Qameta"	Odette George Bazi, Simone Isho		5:43

Alahta D Khubba (1989)
No.	Title	Lyrics	Length
1.	"Alahta D Khubba"	Shimon Keena	5:02
2.	"Shala D Qdala"	Wilson Lilu	8:08
3.	"Banipal"	Linda George	3:52
4.	"Galiya"	Orahim Lazar	3:35
5.	"Shareka D Khayooty"	Ishaya Ilisha Khino	4:28
6.	"Tlanita Et Khobba"	Linda George	5:25
7.	"Aten Ewit Khayee"	Wilson Davidson	2:58
8.	"Shawa Sheneh"	Odette George Bazi	3:30
9.	"Sara Kmeela"	Orahim Lazar	5:43

Kuma W-Khwara (1992)
No.	Title	Lyrics	Music	Length
1.	"Akhnan Eewakh Atourayeh"	Orahim Lazar	Davood A. Tabreezi	2:24
2.	"Neesha D'Khayoota"	Shamasha Yousheya Gewargis	Davood A. Tabreezi	3:41
3.	"Itwa O Litwa"	Orahim Lazar	Davood A. Tabreezi	4:44
4.	"Lai'la Weeta"	Linda George	Davood A. Tabreezi	3:30
5.	"Malikta Shamiram"	Peter Jasim	Peter Jasim	8:53
6.	"Kuma O Khwara"	Orahim Lazar	Davood A. Tabreezi	7:17
7.	"Soora D'go Kampeh"	Orahim Lazar	Davood A. Tabreezi	11:14
8.	"Sara Kmeela"	Orahim Lazar	Davood A. Tabreezi	3:47

Khamra A'tiqa (1993)
No.	Title	Lyrics	Music	Length
1.	"Barwar"	Shimon Keena	George Khoshaba	4:34
2.	"L Marza D Yama"	Shimon Keena	George Khoshaba	3:06
3.	"Bel Ana O Ate"	Orahim Lazar	George Khoshaba	6:09
4.	"Zreeley"	Orahim Lazar	George Khoshaba	4:05
5.	"Matlab D Libbi, (Chape)" (Also known as the "Chappeh" song by Assyrians)	Anwar Atto	George Khoshaba	5:02
6.	"Khamra Ateqa"	Linda George	George Khoshaba	7:08
7.	"Nahra D Taqla"	Ishaya Ilisha Khino, Linda George	George Khoshaba	4:15
8.	"Leton Khzeye"	Atalla Gewargis, Yousif Isho	George Khoshaba	6:00
9.	"Babie"	Orahim Lazar	George Khoshaba

Peace on Earth (Christmas) (1994)
No.	Title	Lyrics	Length
1.	"Shlama Al Ara'a (Peace on Earth)"	Linda George, Michelle Rossi	8:56
2.	"Angels We Have Heard On High"		3:27
3.	"Shabbakh L'marya"		4:42
4.	"Silent Night"		3:32
5.	"Noel (Ammanuel)"	Linda George	1:22
6.	"Ilana D Eyda"	Linda George	0:46
7.	"Adeste Fideles (Temun Ya Mhemne)"		1:21

Khoot Golpaneh D'malakha (1995)
No.	Title	Lyrics	Length
1.	"Ana Atra Litley"	Orahim Lazar	8:56
2.	"Dookha D'Khooba"	Wilson Lilu	3:27
3.	"Moor Hae"	Orahim Lazar	4:42
4.	"Dilma Dance Song"	Orahim Lazar, Iskandar Zamara	3:32
5.	"Khoot Golpaneh D'Malakha"	Linda George, Ashur Atoori	1:22
6.	"Akara"	Orahim Lazar	0:46
7.	"Sara D'Lailawateh"	Orahim Lazar, Linda George	1:21
8.	"Barseen"	Wilson Lilu	1:21

Shteeqoota D'rawoola (2003)
No.	Title	Lyrics	Music	Length
1.	"Malka D' Asheeqeh"	Shimoon Keena	Ody Khoury	8:56
2.	"Seepar"	Linda George	Ody Khoury	3:27
3.	"Shteeqoota D'rawoola"	Shimoon Kenna	Ashur Bandoleros	4:42
4.	"Nahrain"	Linda George, Emanouel Solomon	Ody Khoury	3:32
5.	"Shitqa D'laileh"	Helen Lazar	Ody Khoury	1:22
6.	"Khooba Moodeleh"	Linda George	Ody Khoury	0:46
7.	"Kha Asla"	Orahim Lazar	Ody Khoury	1:21
8.	"Oomtho Hich Lo Maitho (feat. Waleed)"	Waleed, Linda George	Ody Khoury	1:21

Doushi (2007)
No.	Title	Lyrics	Music	Length
1.	"Tlanita D'Timal"	Shimoon Keena	Tiglath Issabey	5:35
2.	"Parkhanita"	Linda George	Ody Khoury	5:12
3.	"Jwanqeleh"	Isaac Isaac	Ashoor Baba	4:33
4.	"In Koola Doonyeh"	Awieya Moroogeh	Tiglath Issabey	5:01
5.	"Idyoom Lailan Bet Awer"	Odette George Bazi	Ashoor Baba	5:00
6.	"Atin Malka OAna Malikta"	Fahed Isaac	Ashoor Baba	3:58
7.	"Doushi"	Linda George, Emmanouel Solomon	Ody Khoury	5:34
8.	"Alqosh"	Shamon Kena	Ody Khoury	9:40

Mokhneeten Minokh (2010)
No.	Title	Lyrics	Length
1.	"Ouf Donyeh"	Fahad Isaac	6:39
2.	"Mokhneeten Minokh"	Fahad Isaac	5:32
3.	"Plitly Khdara"	Helen Lazar	3:58
4.	"Dakhit Msaya"	Linda George	4:25
5.	"Dalaleleh"	Helen Lazar	4:05
6.	"Le Salyan L'Myea"	Fahad Isaac	5:09
7.	"Tokh Zpat Eidey"	Malphono Habsono Bahi	4:03
8.	"Madeeley"	Linda George	6:23

Pearls of the East; Hymns and Chants Of The Holy Apostolic Catholic Assyrian Church of the East (2010)
No.	Title	Lyrics	Music	Length
1.	"(Saint) Mar Yousip Khnanisho"	Fahad Isaac	Ashoor Baba	6:39
2.	"(Martyr) Mar Benyamin Shimun XXI"	Fahad Isaac	Ashoor Baba	5:32
3.	"Awa D'Qooshta (Tribute To The Late Mar Narsai De Baz)"		Ashoor Baba	3:58
4.	"O Gannana"		Ashoor Baba	4:25
5.	"Immar Lie Aedta"		Ashoor Baba	4:05
6.	"Itlan Sawra"		Ashoor Baba	5:09
7.	"Shookha L'haow Yelda"	St. Ephraem The Assyrian	Ashoor Baba	4:03
8.	"Ya Bahra D'Zawnan (Mar Dinkha IV)"	Fahad Isaac	Ashoor Baba	6:23

Poonada (2015)
No.	Title	Lyrics	Length
1.	"Hayir" (This song was made in the wake of the Fall of Mosul to ISIS)	Linda George	5:19
2.	"Ouf Minokh"	Nanny Youkhana	4:30
3.	"Jarabyateh"	Ashur Bet Sargis	5:01
4.	"Ghazaly"	Linda George	3:29
5.	"Awa Shoopra"	Waseem Yousif	4:28
6.	"Poonada"	Linda George	4:04
7.	"Yalla Jaldeh"	Nanny Youkhanna	3:46
8.	"Bil Arpa Goodaneh"	Linda George	4:40

Leela Khteeta (2018)
No.	Title	Lyrics	Length
1.	"Rish Nisaneh"	Nanny Youkhanna	4:04
2.	"Maneewan Ana"	John Homeh	4:44
3.	"Kha Youma"	Nanny Youkhanna	4:30
4.	"Tapqoo"	Orahim Lazar	4:17
5.	"Sleleh L'dipnee Rqada"	Nanny Youkhanna	3:44
6.	"Jajee D'beh Nasimo (feat. Shrara Ibrahim)"	Shamon Kena	4:18
7.	"Le Deraan"	Ibraheem Hanna	5:14
8.	"Ah Leleh"	Nanny Youkhanna	3:49
9.	"Khobba Sheedana (Loco)"	Shamon Kena	3:43
10.	"Leela Khteeta"	Linda George	3:52

=== Live albums ===
Colors of My Country (Live in Brussels '99) (1999)
No.	Title	Lyrics	Length
1.	"Parpalyateh D'Yemma"	Shalim Benyamen Gandalou	5:25
2.	"Jaloo Rawilnaya"	Shimon Keena	4:12
3.	"Eelana D'Khooba"	Hani Shakroo	2:19
4.	"O'lilya Lilya"	Linda George	6:07
5.	"Shineh D'Prashta"	Orahim Lazar	3:19
6.	"Dilma Dance Songs / Shikhda"	Hani Shakroo	6:03
7.	"Aziza D'Libbey"	Aboo George	5:06
8.	"Lilyana"	Folk Naveh & George Dinkha	5:30
9.	"Beryou"	Atalla Gewargis & Yousif Isho	3:28

=== Compilation albums ===
The Golden Collection (1997)
No.	Title	Lyrics	Music	Length
1.	"Hal Eman"	Odette George Bazi	William Nisan	4:26
2.	"Marqidly"	Nashat Younan	William Nisan	3:50
3.	"Nishra D'Atour"	Linda George	William Nisan	3:25
4.	"La Khashwit Min Barokh"	Nashat Younan	William Nisan	4:34
5.	"Kursia D'Malkoota"	Linda George	Rosson Bet Yonan	5:30
6.	"Qissat D'Khoubbi"	Linda George	Rosson Bet Yonan	5:10
7.	"Itkhae D'Khoubban (Tascan Tascan)"	Odette George Bazi	Rosson Bet Yonan	4:04
8.	"Gishra Shmita"	Nashat Younan	Rosson Bet Yonan	6:12
9.	"Jnanta D Yemma"	Yatron Darmo	Ashoor Baba	7:07
10.	"Moukhebey Kheshaeleh"	Yatron Darmo	Ashoor Baba	4:19
11.	"Khiapta D'Khitna"		Ashoor Baba	4:17
12.	"Gooleh"		Ashoor Baba	3:07
13.	"Atooraya"	Orahim Lazar	Ashoor Baba	4:28
14.	"La Bassa"	Odette George Bazi	Ashoor Baba	3:52
15.	"Eelana"	Anwar Hawil	Rosson Bet Yonan	5:04
16.	"Shlama"	Niemo Marcus		4:28
17.	"Bil Drananeh D Khooba"	Wilson Davidson	Rosson Bet Yonan	5:39
18.	"Alahta D Khubba (Shoopra O Khaila)"	Shimon Keena	Ashoor Baba	5:02
19.	"Shala D Qdala"	Wilson Lilu	Ashoor Baba	8:08
20.	"Galeya"	Orahim Lazar	Ashoor Baba	6:02
21.	"Aten Ewit Khayee"	Wilson Davidson	Ashoor Baba	2:58
22.	"Sara Kmeela"	Orahim Lazar	Ashoor Baba	5:43
23.	"Akhnan Eewakh Atourayeh"	Orahim Lazar	Davood A. Tabreezi	2:24
24.	"Lai'la Weeta"	Linda George	Davood A. Tabreezi	3:30
25.	"Kuma O Khwara"	Orahim Lazar	Davood A. Tabreezi	7:17
26.	"Khamra Ateqa"	Linda George	George Khoshaba	7:08
27.	"Matlab D Libbi, (Chape)"	Anwar Atto	George Khoshaba	5:02
28.	"Zreeley"	Orahim Lazar	George Khoshaba	4:05
29.	"Barwar"	Shimon Keena	George Khoshaba	4:34

Linda George Greatest Hits, Vol.1
No.	Title	Lyrics	Music	Length
1.	"Atooraya"	Orahim Lazar	Ashoor Baba	4:28
2.	"La Bassa"	Odette George Bazi	Ashoor Baba	3:52
3.	"Marqidly"	Nashat Younan	William Nisan	3:50
4.	"Hal Eiman"	Odette George Bazi	William Nisan	4:26
5.	"Chicago"	Odette George Bazi	William Nisan	3:05
6.	"Sara Kmeela"	Orahim Lazar		5:43
7.	"Aten Ewit Khayee"	Wilson Davidson		2:58
8.	"Alahta D Khubba"	Shimon Keena		5:02
9.	"La Khashwit Min Barokh"	Nashat Younan	William Nisan	4:34
10.	"Moukhebey Kheshaeleh"	Yatron Darmo	Ashoor Baba	4:19
11.	"Sheeta Khadta" (Arabic version of Sheeta Khadta)	George Dinkha	Ashoor Baba	4:55

Linda George Greatest Hits, Vol.2
No.	Title	Lyrics	Music	Length
1.	"Nahrain"	Linda George, Emanouel Solomon	Ody Khoury	3:32
2.	"Ana Atra Litley"	Orahim Lazar		8:56
3.	"Yalekhta Khwarta"			7:10
4.	"Shala D Qdala"	Wilson Lilu		8:08
5.	"Zreeley"	Orahim Lazar	George Khoshaba	4:05
6.	"Malka D' Asheeqeh"	Shimoon Keena	Ody Khoury	8:56
7.	"Tlanita Et Khobba"	Linda George		5:25
8.	"Lai'la Weeta"	Linda George	Davood A. Tabreezi	3:30
9.	"Matlab D Libbi, (Chape)"	Anwar Atto	George Khoshaba	5:02

Linda George & Friends in 3 Decades (2013)
No.	Title	Lyrics	Music	Length
1.	"Atour O Ashour (feat.Walter Aziz)"	Wilson Dadisho	Ashur Bandoleros, Ben Wedge	5:23
2.	"Mokhibee Sogul" (Dedicated to Edward Yousif Biba)	Esho Warda	Ashur Bandoleros, Ben Wedge	6:40
3.	"Chehbo (feat. Urhay Warda)"	Rita Bityou	Ashur Bandoleros, Ben Wedge	3:52
4.	"Bayanokh / Bayenakh (feat. Bubkey)"	Fahad Isaac	Sevan Vertan	4:31
5.	"Qam Shaweqlee Mokhibee" (Dedicated to Albert Ruel Tamras)	Albert Ruel Tamras	Ashur Bandoleros	5:12
6.	"Girgeh Shamo (feat. Enliel Ninos Aho)"	Malphono Ninos Aho	Ashur Bandoleros	5:52
7.	"Eiman (feat. Charles Tooma)"	Sevan Vertan	Ashur Bandoleros, Ben Wedge	4:16
8.	"Dalale (feat. Sargon Gabriel)"		William Nissan	6:41
9.	"La Pshum Ya Libbi (feat. David Simon)"	Moreen Moshe	Ashoor Baba	5:30

== EPs ==
No Quarter (2001)
No.	Title	Lyrics	Length
1.	"No Quarter"	Linda and Michelle Rossi	4:34
2.	"No Quarter (Club Mix)"		3:06
3.	"I Thought I Was an Angel"	Linda and Michelle Rossi	6:09

== Singles ==
Title	Release
"Sheeta Khadta/Aam Jaded"	2010
"Sariq Al Malakoot"	2013
"Heaven, I Am Here (From "The Longest Road")"	2017
"Khadoota D'mawlada D'msheekha"	2019
"An Wardeh" "Khoyada"	2020
"Kma Shapeereh" "Ta Dour"	2021
"Athree"	2022
"Kawkhwa"	2024
"Leton Jawoobee"	2025

== Other appearances ==
In 1997, "Tarah D'Virokh" (You Closed The Door), a song from her 1983 album, was featured in the opening scene of "Furies" on the third season of Xena: Warrior Princess, where the Furies slowly dance to it for Ares in a ritual way. The song was remixed into having a worldbeat rhythm and the vocals were provided by singer Julie Yousif. (Note: In the show, the song was mashed up with "Aha Kiana Zalim" (This Cruel Nature) by Jermain Tamraz, with Yousif also providing the vocals.) The song still remains to be the only Assyrian-language music to be featured in a Hollywood soundtrack.

=== Guest appearances ===
Year	Album	Artist
1981	Dalaleh	Sargon Gabriel
1986	Atouraya	Raad Zaia
1989	Qam Parshilan	Raad Zaia
1989	Jwanka D'Hakkari	Janan Sawa
1993	Matan	George Homeh
1998	Sahda	Ramsen Sheeno
2024	Our Love	Homeh Lazar
