= 2008 Sichuan riots =

2008 riots in Sichuan province

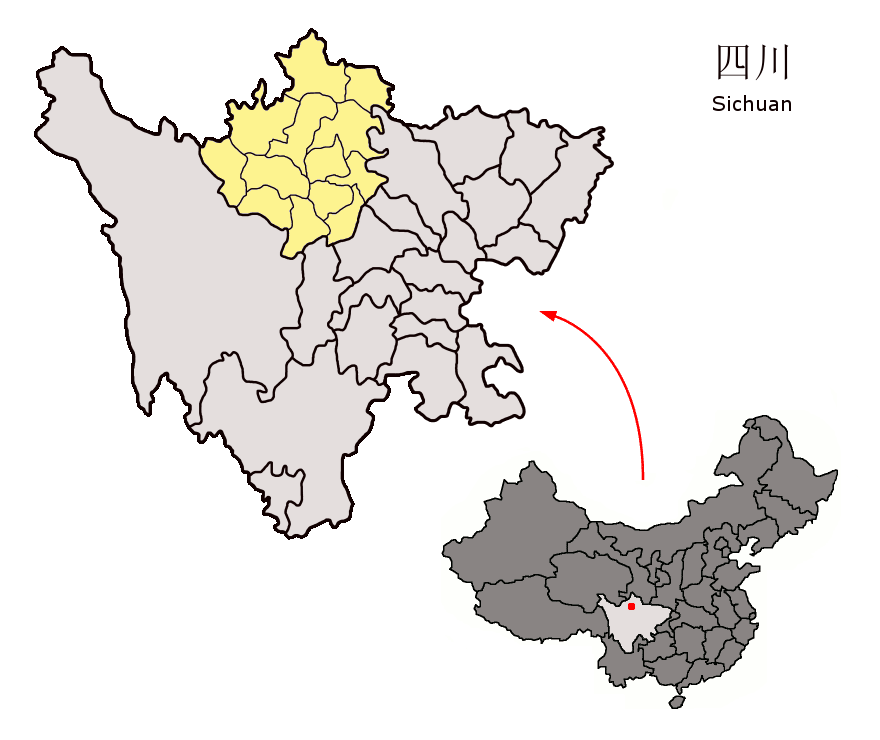
Ngawa Prefecture within Sichuan Province

In Sichuan province, in an area incorporating the traditional Tibetan areas Kham and Amdo, Tibetan monks and police clashed in riots on 16 March in Ngaba county (Aba) after the monks staged a protest. It formed part of the 2008 Tibetan unrest and was one of two major events to happen in Sichuan during 2008, the other being the 2008 Sichuan earthquake in May 2008.

== Events ==
On 16 March, Tibetan monks staged a protest against its harsh treatment by the Chinese government. The word got out and the police became involved. The monks and local residents clashed with police, killing at least one policeman, and setting fire to three or four police vans.

In Aba, an eyewitness said 17 people were killed, including a young girl that attended middle school. By 18 March, the witness described the area as teeming with police and soldiers, and the people as anxious. Protests continued for several days.

On 24 March, AP reports that Chinese state-run Xinhua said "381 people involved in protests...had surrendered to police" in Aba, which was not verified by independent sources.

== Unverified reports ==
As reported by the BBC, the unverified reports in Sichuan and the "expulsions and restrictions of foreigners, and uncorroborated reports of vast convoys of paramilitaries entering areas of unrest, raise fears that the government has created a "black box" in which its security personnel can take action without scrutiny."

The BBC also reports, "Unrest was also said to have flared again in Aba, Sichuan, where there are claims that police shot between 13 and 30 protesters after a police station was set on fire. Like Tibetan exiles' claims that at least 80 have died in Lhasa, the reports of deaths are impossible to verify because of the restrictions on journalists."

== Crackdown on violence ==
During the week of 22 March, authorities and security forces in the city of Chengdu, the capital of Sichuan, locked down a Tibetan neighborhood located near the Southwest University for Nationalities and the Wu Hou Temple. The lockdown comes amid unconfirmed reports of Tibetan protests earlier in the week and unconfirmed reports of a stabbing attack of a Han Chinese man by a Tibetan. Cars and other vehicles are not allowed to drive through the neighborhood, which has a large police presence.

In Sichuan's Ngaba prefecture, Chinese authorities fired on protestors. The Tibetan government-in-exile's Central Tibetan Administration states the police shot and killed 19 people during the protest. The Chinese authorities denied killing anyone. Photographs of bodies with bullet wounds were released by a rights group.

The Foreign Correspondents Club of China has reported "official interference with journalists in Chengdu", and that travel by foreign journalists to other areas of the province has been restricted.

== Arrests ==
On 21 and 27 March, nuns of the Kirti Monastery in Ngawa county were arrested by Chinese police forces. The information was confirmed by the Swiss newspaper Neue Zürcher Zeitung after phonecalls into the region with locals. Troops also blocked roads in nearby Sertar. The London-based Free Tibet Campaign reported that troops had been sent to the county after residents blew up a bridge near the village of Gudu. Arrests have also been reported from Sertar after security forces cracked down on protests.

== Further clashes ==
On Monday, 24 March 2008 in Drango county, Garze prefecture, a Tibetan rights group reports 200 monks, nuns, and ordinary people gathered to march before clashes with police began. Police fired shots into the crowd, killing a monk and critically wounding another monk, as reported to Associated Press by the Tibetan Center for Human Rights and Democracy (TCHRD).

On 25 March, Chinese public-run Xinhua News Agency, citing local authorities, reported that one police officer was dead and "several others" injured, as sympathy protests spread in western Tibet, and added the police were "forced to fire warning shots" and had "dispersed the lawless mobsters."

On 27 and 30 March, the suicides by two monks in Amdo have been reported by TCHRD as an act of freeing from oppression. Independent verification is however outstanding.

On 3 April new violence broke out in Sichuan as various sources report. According to Xinhua News Agency at least one government official has been seriously injured. An overseas Tibet activist group said eight people had been killed in the incident. It said police opened fire on hundreds of Buddhist monks and lay people who marched on local government offices to demand the release of two monks detained for possessing photographs of the Dalai Lama. Unidentified eyewitnesses told Radio Free Asia's Tibetan agency that 15 people had been killed in the incident.
