= Self-immolation protests by Tibetans in China =

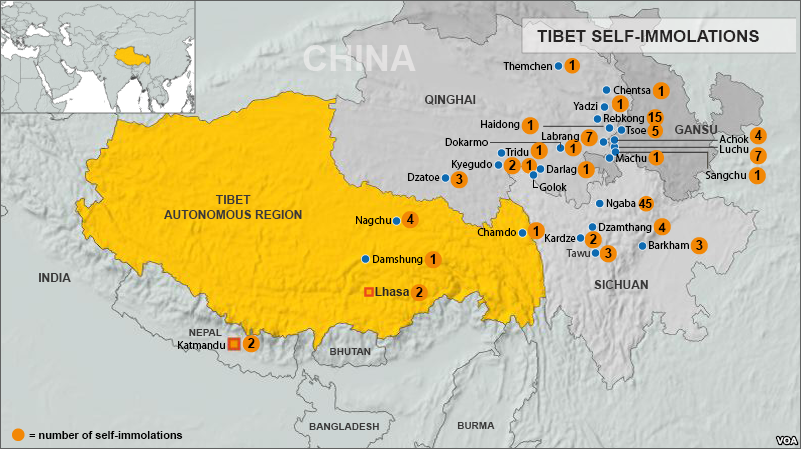
Map of Tibetan self-immolations, updated 27 August 2012

As of May 2022, 160 monks, nuns, and ordinary people have immolated themselves in Tibet and surrounding regions since 27 February 2009, when Tapey, a young monk from Kirti Monastery, set himself on fire in the marketplace in Ngawa City, Ngawa County, Sichuan. According to the International Campaign for Tibet (ICT), "Chinese police have beaten, shot, isolated, and disappeared self-immolators who survived."

In 2011, a wave of self-immolations by Tibetans in Tibet, as well as in India and Nepal, occurred after the self-immolation of Phuntsog of 16 March 2011 in Ngawa County, Sichuan. Protests are ongoing. In 2016, an 18-year-old monk in Tibet and a 16-year-old Tibetan student living in India both immolated themselves in protest of Chinese control over Tibet. In response, Karmapa Ogyen Trinley Dorje said that nearly 150 Tibetans had self-immolated at that time as a form of protest, and he pleaded with Tibetans worldwide to use other forms of protest instead.

== Summary ==
Most of the protesters have been monks and nuns, or ex-monks Some of the protesters who set themselves on fire were teenagers.

Most protests have taken place in Amdo near the Kirti Monastery, especially in Ngawa City, Ngawa County, Sichuan, others in Gansu and Qinghai and Tibet Autonomous Region. Self-immolation protests by Tibetans also occurred in India and Kathmandu, Nepal.

According to Reuters, the Dalai Lama said in March 2012 he does not encourage the protests, but he has praised the courage of those who had engaged in self-immolation and blamed the self-immolations on "cultural genocide" by the Chinese. Four months later the Dalai Lama made clear that he wishes to remain neutral regarding this topic and he explained why to The Hindu:

This is a very, very delicate political issue. Now, the reality is that if I say something positive, then the Chinese immediately blame me. If I say something negative, then the family members of those people feel very sad. They sacrificed their own life. It is not easy. So I do not want to create some kind of impression that this is wrong. So the best thing is to remain neutral.

When asked by an Australian journalist – in the context of self-immolations to oppose Chinese rule and policies – if Tibetans are "losing patience with non-violence", the Dalai Lama replied:

No. I think the self-burning itself on practice of non-violence. These people, you see, they easily use bomb explosive, more casualty people. But they didn't do that. Only sacrifice their own life. So this also is part of practice of non-violence.

French anthropologist Katia Buffetrille comments:

During the hunger strike of Thubten Ngödrup in 1998, the Dalai Lama expressed his disagreement with this kind of practice, which he considered as violence against oneself. However, he cites often Gandhi, for whom hunger strike was a non-violent act. He expressed his admiration for the courage of these people and attended prayers for them. But he questioned the effectiveness of such actions, he said, [these actions] lead to increased repression. Now he does not want to say anything about this [topic] any more.

Wen Jiabao, then premier of China, said that such extreme actions hurt social harmony and that Tibet and the Tibetan areas of Sichuan are integral parts of Chinese territory. According to The Economist, the self-immolations have caused the government's attitude to harden. Stephen Prothero, a Boston University religion scholar, writing on CNN Belief Blog, suggests: "Why not create [what the Dalai Lama describes as] 'some kind of impression' that killing was wrong? Why not use his vast store of moral and spiritual capital to denounce this ritual of human sacrifice?", adding that "if the Dalai Lama were to speak out unequivocally against these deaths, they would surely stop. So in a very real sense, their (self-immolators') blood is on his (the Dalai Lama's) hands." Tenzin Dorjee, executive director of Students for a Free Tibet, opposed that view on the CNN Belief Blog, urging to "understand the self-immolations" and arguing "instead of responding to China's oppression with revenge – a path far more tempting to the basic human instinct – Tibetans have chosen a means far more peaceful. Without harming a single Chinese…". He is of the opinion that Stephen Prothero expresses "a colossal indifference to the courage and circumstances of those fighting for the same democratic freedoms and human rights that he himself enjoys."

== Impact ==
Despite considerable loss of life during the Tibetan protests in 2008 on the part of both the Tibetan and Han population in Tibet, casualties were simply not reported by the Chinese government. Self-immolations, on the other hand, result in dramatic images of the protester, while burning or afterwards, which can be easily transmitted over the internet to news media and supporters. Internet access has reached even remote areas in the parts of China where Tibetans live.

However, sensitive areas of Tibet are often subject to communication clampdowns. These blackouts, along with the ban of foreign journalists and human rights monitors, means obtaining exact numbers of self-immolations in Tibet is difficult. However, a number of organizations, such as Free Tibet, do keep up-to-date lists of confirmed incidents. Most of the Tibetan independence movement organizations state that self-immolation acts of Tibetans are an affirmation of the Tibetan identity in the face of "cultural genocide". These records of self-immolation often receive significant international attention and are often referenced when conducting awareness fundraising activities for freedoms in Tibet, receiving with wide support from cultural exponents like Hollywood actors or famous musicians.

== Time and place ==
=== 2009 ===
- 1

February: Ngawa 1

=== 2011 ===
- 14 (12 in Tibetan areas, 1 India, 1 Nepal),

March: Ngawa 1, August: Kardze (Dau County) 1, September: Ngawa 2, October: Ngawa 5, Kardze 1, November: Kardze (Dau County) 1, India 1, Nepal 1, December: Chamdo 1

=== 2012 ===
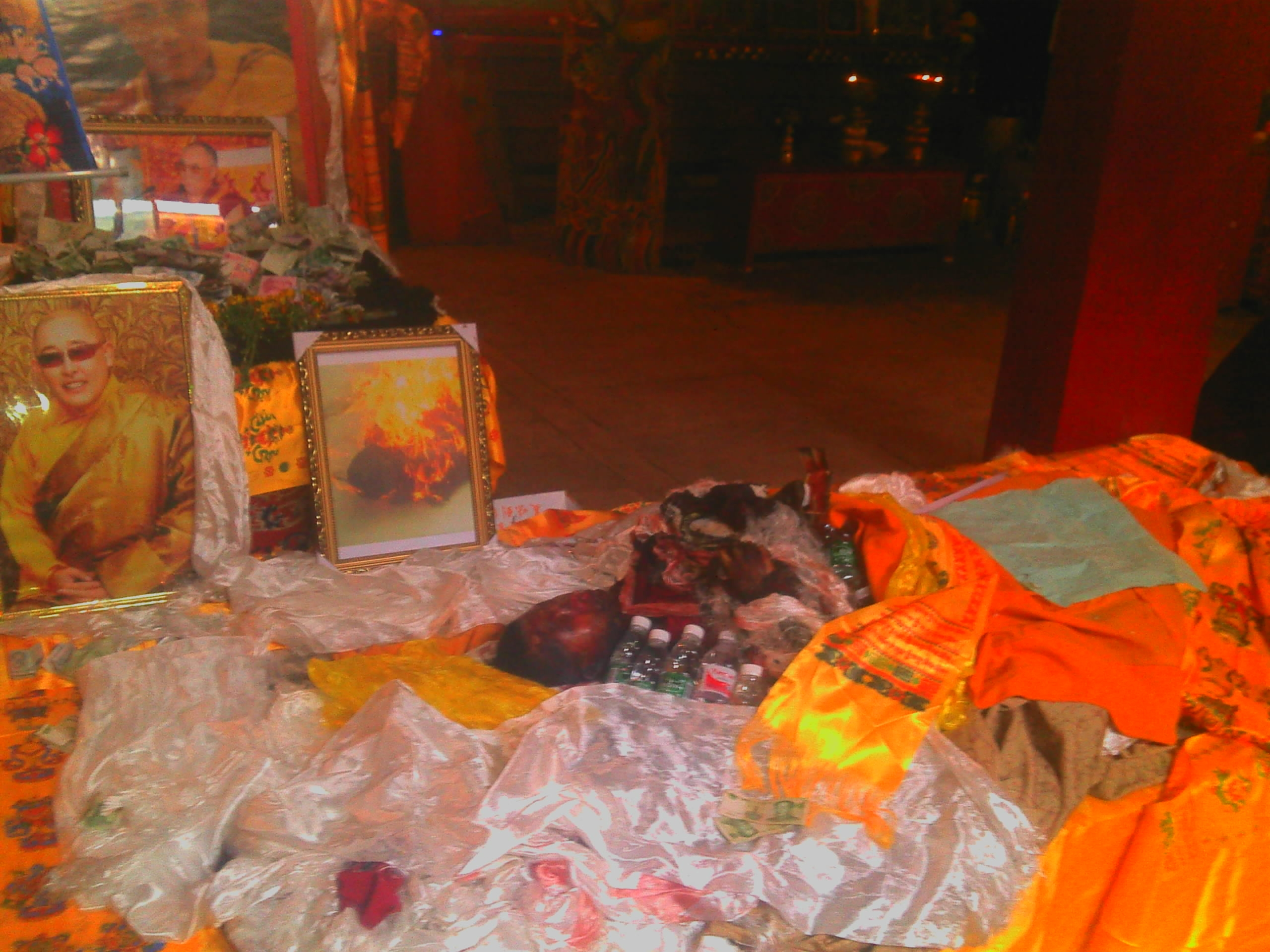
- Palden Choetso's body inside Nyitso monastery, Tibet after self-immolation on 5 November 2011
  86 (84 in Tibetan areas, Beijing 1, India 1)

January (4): Ngawa 3, Golog 1, February (6): Ngawa 4, Yushu (Thridu County) 1, Amdo Haixi 1, March (11): Kanlho 1, Ngawa 7, Malho (Rebkong County) 2, India 1, April (4): Kardze 2, Ngawa 2, May (3): Lhasa City 2, Ngawa 1, June (4): Malho (Cantsha County) 1, Yushu (Thridu County) 2, Yushu 1, July (2): Lhasa (Damshung County) 1, Ngawa 1, August (7): Ngawa 6, Kanlho 1, September (2): Beijing 1, Yushu (Zado County) 1, October (10): Nagchu 1, Kanlho 7, Nagchu (Driru County) 2, November (28): Malho (Rebkong County) 9, Malho (Zeku County) 3, Amdo Haidong 1, Ngawa 3, Ngawa (Zoige County) 2, Kardze 1, Nagchu (Driru County) 1, Kanlho 2, Kanlho (Sangchu County) 3, Kanlho (Luchu County) 3, December (5): Kanlho (Sangchu County) 1, Kanlho (Luchu County) 1, Golog 1, Ngawa 1, Malho 1,

=== 2013 ===
- 28 (26 in Tibetan areas, 2 Nepal)

January (3): Kanlho (Sangchu County) 2, Ngawa 1, February (9): Ngawa 1, Kanlho (Sangchu County) 2, Nepal 1, Ngawa (Zoige County) 3, Amdo Haidong 1, Kanlho (Luchu County) 1, March (5): Ngawa (Zoige County) 1, Ngawa 2, Kanlho (Sangchu County) 1, Kanlho (Luchu County) 1, April (3): Ngawa 1, Ngawa (Zoige) 2, May (1): Yushu (Chumarleb County) 1, June (1): Kardze (Dau County) 1, July (1): Ngawa (Zoige County) 1, August (1): Nepal 1, September (1): Ngawa 1, November (1): Golog 1, December (2): Ngawa 1, Kanlho (Sangchu County) 1,

=== 2014 ===
- 11

February (2): Malho 1, Ngawa 1, March (3): Malho 1, Ngawa 1, Kardze (Litang County) 1, April (1): Kardze (Dau County) 1, September: (2) Golog 1, Kanlho 1, December (3): Kanlho 1, Ngawa 1, Kardze (Dau County) 1,

=== 2015 ===
- 7

March: Ngawa 1, April (2): Kardze 1, Ngawa 1, May (2): Kardze (Dau County) 1, Kanlho (Jonê County) 1, July (1): Yushu, August (1): Kanlho (Sangqu county)1,

=== 2016 ===
- 3

February (1): Kardze (Nyarong county), March (1): Ngawa (Dzoege county), December (1): Kardze (Machu county),

=== 2017 ===
- 6 (until 5 June)

March (1): Kardze, April (1): Kardze, May (2): Kanlho (Bora county) 1, Chentsa (Malho county), November (1): Kardze, December (1): Chukle Gongma pastoral community in Cha village, Ngaba county

=== 2018 ===
- 2

March (1): (5th village, Meuruma Township, Ngaba County), November (1): (Jakorma village in the Choejema area, Ngaba County)

=== 2019 ===
- 1

November (1): (Meruma in Ngaba)

=== 2022 ===
- 2

February (1): Nagchu, March (1): Kirti (Ngaba county)

== See also ==
- Political situation in Tibet
- Sinicization of Tibet
- Anti-Chinese sentiment in Tibet
- 1959 Tibetan uprising
- History of Tibet (1950–present)
- Annexation of Tibet by the People's Republic of China
- List of political self-immolations
