= Baz =

Baz or BAZ may refer to:

== Places ==
- Baz, Albania, a village
- Baz, Iran, a village in central Iran
- Baz (tribe), an Assyrian tribe from eastern Turkey
- BAZ, IATA airport code of Barcelos Airport, Barcelos, Brazil
- BAZ, FAA airport code of New Braunfels Municipal Airport, New Braunfels, Texas, United States
- Bazm, Fars, also known as Bāz, a village in Iran
- Borsod-Abaúj-Zemplén, or BAZ, a county in Hungary

== Brands and enterprises ==
- Baz (software), distributed version control software
- Basler Zeitung (BaZ), a regional newspaper, published in Basel, Switzerland
- Boryspilskyi Avtobusnyi Zavod, or BAZ, a Ukrainian bus manufacturer
- Bratislavské Automobilové Závody, or BAZ, a Slovak car manufacturer of Czech Skoda and VW Group cars from 1971(?) to 1982
- Bryanskyi Avtomobilnyi Zavod, or BAZ, a Russian heavy truck manufacturer

== Other uses ==
- Baz (name), a list of people and fictional characters with the surname, given name or nickname
- baz, a metasyntactic variable
- Bundesanstalt für Züchtungsforschung, or BAZ, a research organisation in Germany

== See also ==
- Baaz (disambiguation)
