= Setenling Gompa =

- Location within Aba Tibetan and Qiang Autonomous Prefecture

Religion
- Affiliation: Tibetan Buddhism
- Sect: Jonangpa
- Leadership: Thubten Dorje Rinpoche

Location
- Location: Aba Tibetan and Qiang Autonomous Prefecture, Sichuan Province of China.
- Country: China
- Interactive map of Setenling Gompa
- Coordinates: 32°54′1″N 101°43′19.53″E

Architecture
- Founder: Namnang Dorje
- Established: mid-13th to 14th centuries

Setenling Gompa, Ser Gompa, (pinyin: Saigesi) is a Jonangpa (or Jonang) monastery about a kilometre from the eastern edge of Aba or Ngawa City (Chinese: 阿坝镇; pinyin: Ābà Zhèn Standard Tibetan: Ngawa), the main city in Ngawa (Aba) County, within the Ngawa (Aba) Tibetan and Qiang Autonomous Prefecture (Tibetan: Amdo) in northwestern Sichuan, China. It is located on the Tibetan Plateau at an elevation of 3,200 metres (10,499 ft.). The head lama, Thubten Dorje Rinpoche, is still living in the monastery.

== Description ==
One enters the courtyard through a gate between the office cum shop of the monastery and a mani wall with the large restored Assembly Hall in front. The Assembly Hall contains many images of Kunkhyen Dolpopa, Jetsun Kunga Drolchok, Taranatha, Namnang Dorje as well as of the deities Cakrasamvara and Kalacakra.

Left of the Assembly Hall are the Tsenyi Dratsang with a walled garden for debating, the Gonkhang with an image of Takkiraja, the 'tiger-riding' form of Mahakala, and the Drubkhang or meditation hermitage with images of Dolpopa, Taranatha, Namnang Dorje and the deity Vajrakila. Newer buildings include the Dukhor Lolang with a three-dimensional mandala of Kalacakra and the Head Lama's residence with a Jokhang Chapel containing many fine images, books and tankas.

== History ==
The monastery was founded by Namnang Dorje, and reconstituted in the late 19th century by Dro-ge Yonten Gyatso. There are about 800 affiliated monks.

== Ceremonies ==
- Sunning the Buddha and turning Maitreya Buddha.
