= Ngaba (disambiguation) =

Ngaba may refer to:

- Ngaba (Democratic Republic of Congo), a small commune in the Democratic Republic of Congo
- Ngawa Tibetan and Qiang Autonomous Prefecture, prefecture in Sichuan, China
- Ngawa County, county in Ngawa Prefecture, Sichuan, China
