= Manuel Vicente Maza =

Argentine politician

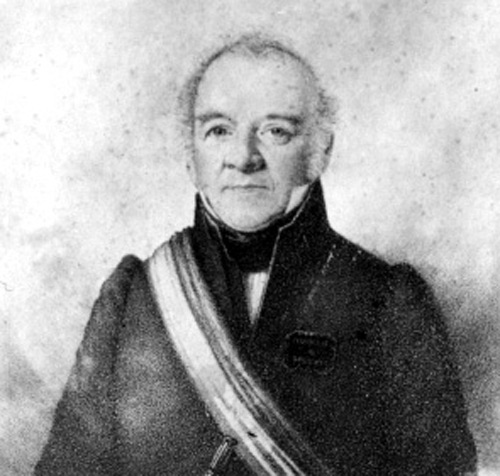
- Maza portrayed by Ignacio Baz

Governor of Buenos Aires Province
- In office 27 June 1834 – 7 March 1835
- Preceded by: Juan José Viamonte
- Succeeded by: Juan Manuel de Rosas

Personal details
- Born: April 5, 1779 Buenos Aires, Argentina
- Died: June 27, 1839 (aged 60) Buenos Aires, Argentina
- Party: Federal
- Spouse: Mercedes Fernandez Puelma Andrade
- Children: Ramón Maza
- Occupation: Lawyer

Manuel Vicente Maza (April 5, 1779 – June 27, 1839) was an Argentine lawyer and Federalist politician who briefly served as interim Governor of Buenos Aires from 1834 to 1835. A close ally of the Juan Manuel de Rosas, Maza was nonetheless assassinated in his office by the Mazorca in 1839 following the discovery of a plot by his son Ramón to overthrow the dictator.

== Biography ==
Even though Maza was born in Buenos Aires, he finished his university studies in Law at the Royal University of San Felipe, in Santiago, Chile.

As the independence movement from Spain grew in South America, Maza was taken prisoner in Lima, by that time the centre of the Viceroyalty of Peru, and later spent time in reclusion in Buenos Aires, released in 1815. That year he started his political activity as head of the Civil Commission of Justice of Buenos Aires, bringing about the justice administration regulation named after him. In 1816 he served as mayor at the Buenos Aires Cabildo.

In the following years he developed a friendship and political relationship with Juan Manuel de Rosas.

During the 1820s Maza became widely involved in political activity. He was sent to exile for the first time in 1823 because of his participation in the uprising against Martín Rodríguez, and then again in 1829 to Bahía Blanca for rising up against Juan Lavalle.

When Rosas returned to power, Maza assumed an important role in Rosas' government. At the meeting with José María Paz in Córdoba, Maza accompanied Rosas, when they suffered an assassination attempt.

After Rosas left to the frontier in 1832, Maza was named Chief Minister by Juan Ramón Balcarce, but a year later he took part in the movement that demanded Balcarce's resignation. He also took part in the following brief administration of Juan José Viamonte.

In 1834, and after several potential candidates refused to take the government of the Buenos Aires Province, Maza, as president of the legislature, was designated interim governor. In February 1835 he sent Facundo Quiroga as mediator in the conflict between the governors of the provinces of Salta and Tucumán. As Quiroga was assassinated on his way back to Buenos Aires, Maza was forced to resign on March 7; Rosas once again became governor on April 13.

Maza went back to the legislature in spite of the growing confrontations with Rosas that started during Maza's term in the government. He was also designated as judge in the trial to the Reinafé brothers, accused of Quiroga's assassination.

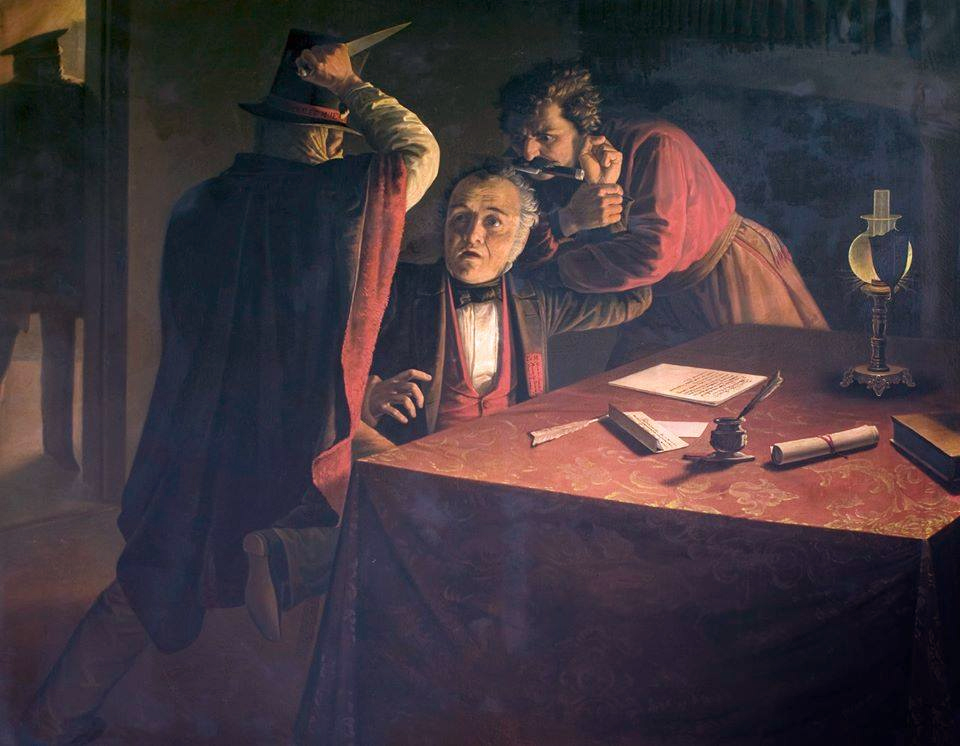
Death of Manuel Maza.

=== Conspiracy ===
In June 1839 Maza's son, coronel Ramón Maza, was taken prisoner, suspected of a conspiracy against Rosas.

During the French blockade of the Río de la Plata, Juan Lavalle organized an army in Uruguay, attempting to attack Buenos Aires. His plans were supported by conspiracies in Buenos Aires by former member of the May Association. The most notable member of the conspiracy was Ramón Maza, son of the former governor Manuel Vicente Maza, who got military support. As Lavalle was delaying, they developed a new plan: Pedro Castelli and Nicolás Granada would make a revolt at Tapalqué, while the military in the city killed Rosas, Manuel Maza assumed government and allowed Lavalle to take the city.

=== Death ===
The plot was discovered by the Mazorca, a security agency of Rosas, but the latter thought that Manuel Maza was innocent and carried the plots of his son, so he urged him to leave the country. He could not: Martínez Fontes, one of the military talked into the complot, revealed it in public. Popular commotion was high, and the people took the streets demanding the execution of the people involved with the complot. Ramón Maza was executed, and his father was killed in his office by the Mazorca. Nevertheless, Pedro Castelli attempted to make a rebellion in the countryside. The people did not follow him, and he was executed as well.

== Bibliography ==
- Luna, Félix (2004). Grandes protagonistas de la historia Argentina: Juan Manuel de Rosas (in Spanish). Buenos Aires: La Nación. ISBN 950-49-1251-6.

Political offices
Preceded by Juan José Viamonte	Governor of Buenos Aires Province; 1834–1835	Succeeded by Juan Manuel de Rosas
