= Stéphanie Elbaz =

French pianist

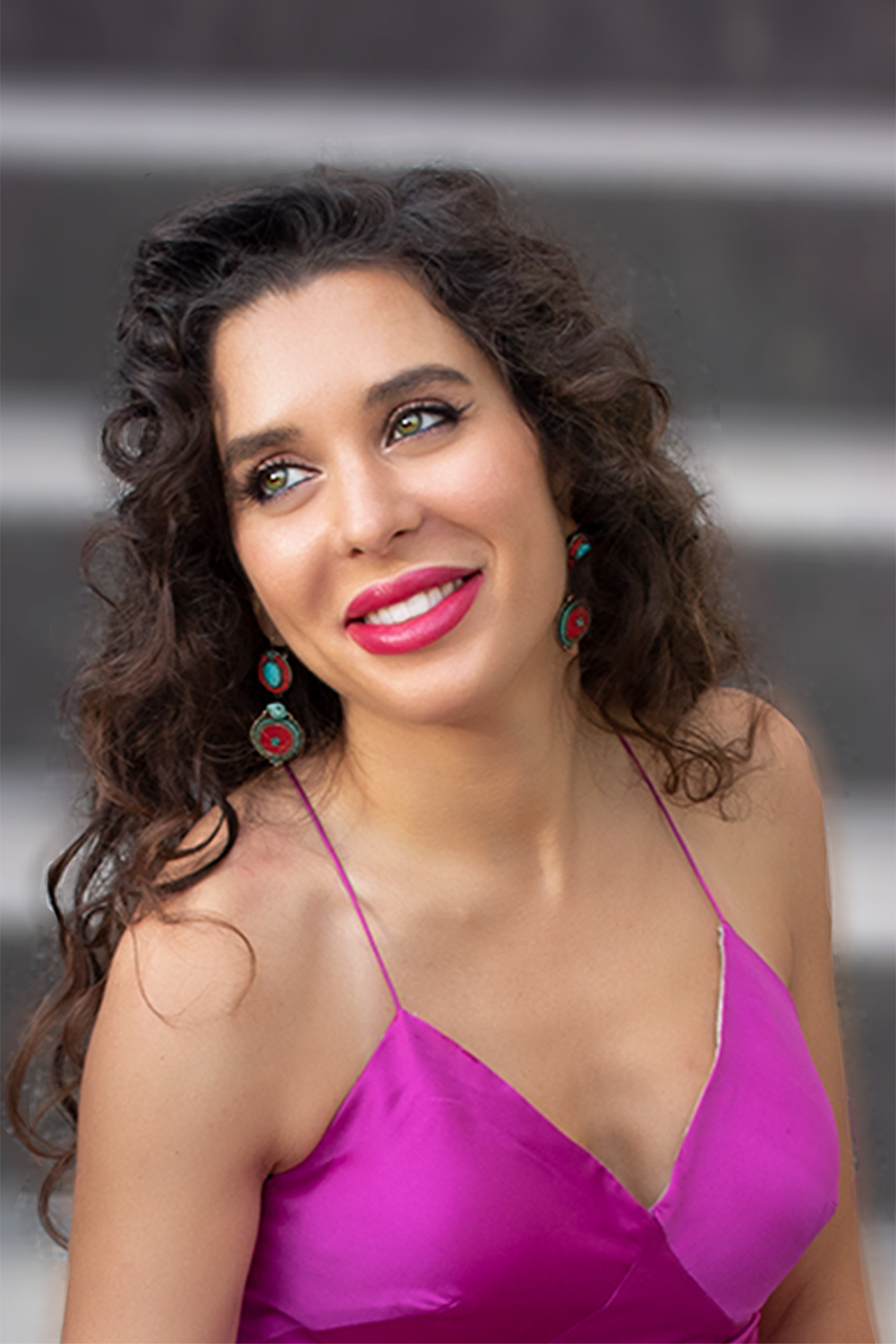
Stephanie Elbaz

Stéphanie Elbaz is a contemporary French concert pianist. She has performed at the Mozarteum concert hall in Salzburg, the De Doelen in Rotterdam, the salle Alfred Cortot in Paris, the Palazzo Ducale in Tuscany, the Essaouira festival in Morocco, etc.

== Biography ==
Born in Casablanca, Morocco, she is the niece of the painter André Elbaz. She first studied the guitar, and at the age of twelve she studied piano at the conservatory of Perpignan, then at the conservatories of Montpellier, Toulouse, Marseille and Paris. She has always had male teachers.

She obtained her Postmaster, Master and Degree of piano with the High Distinctions in great European conservatories. She also spent three cycles of professional development in three different Conservatoire à rayonnement régional. She won two piano gold medals with the congratulations of the jury unanimously in two different CNR. Stéphanie Elbaz has also participated in numerous master classes in Europe.

In 2017 in Prague, she performed the Concerto for solo piano by Charles-Valentin Alkan, reputed to be one of the most difficult works in the pianistic repertoire.

In August 2023, she gave a recital as part of the Classical Music Festival of La Llagonne during which, alongside works by Frédéric Chopin, Franz Schubert and Isaac Albéniz, she gave the French premiere performance of the three pieces Romantic Young Ladies by Corentin Boissier.

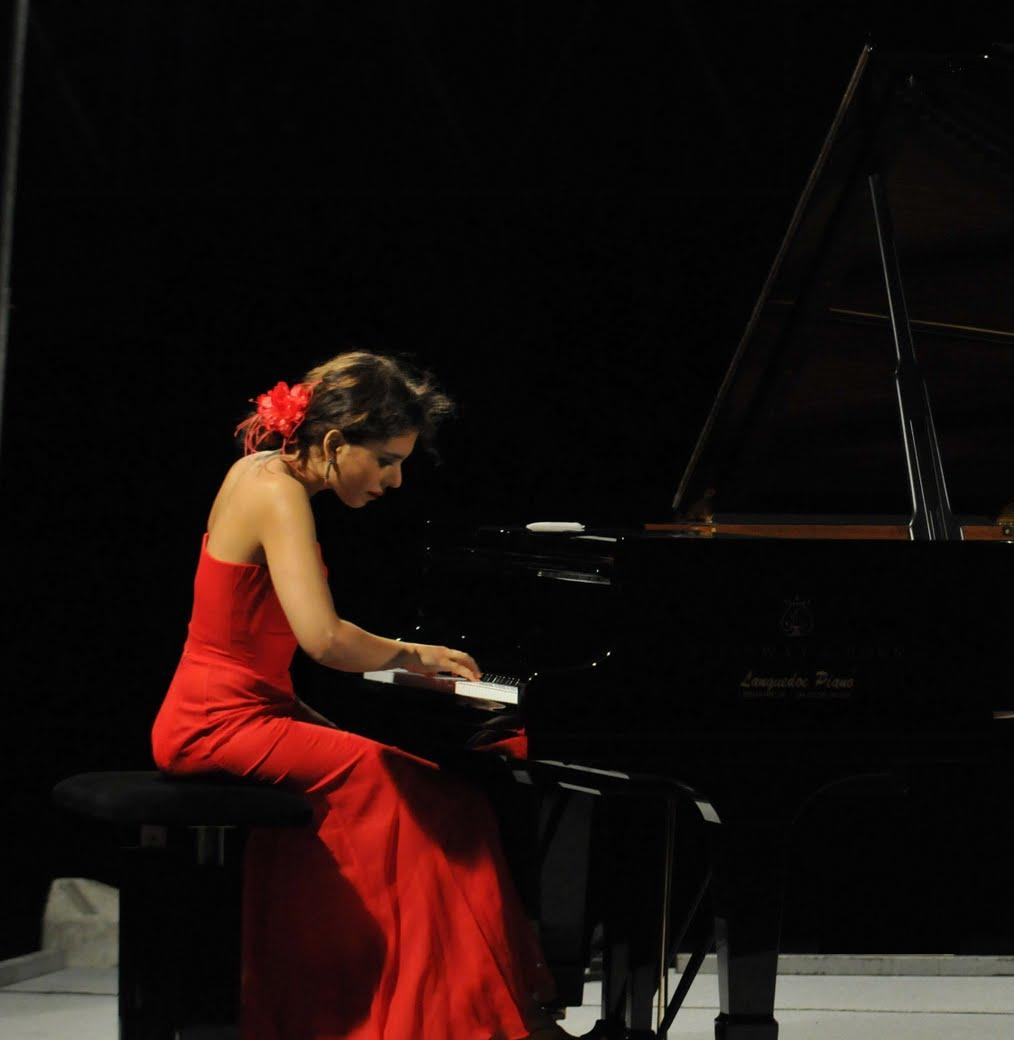
Stéphanie Elbaz at the Béziers arenas, France.

== Selected recordings ==
- Franz Liszt's Rhapsodie espagnole S 254, audio recording on the pianist's official YouTube channel. Video on YouTube.
- Frédéric Chopin's Fantaisie-Impromptu opus 66, audio recording on the pianist's official YouTube channel. Video on YouTube
- Charles-Valentin Alkan's Concerto for solo piano, "live" video of a concert in Prague. Video on YouTube
- Sergueï Rachmaninov's Prelude opus 23 No. 5, video on the pianist's official YouTube channel. Video on YouTube
- Corentin Boissier's Romantic Young Ladies, three pieces for piano, French premiere, video on the composer's official YouTube channel. Video on YouTube
