= Falling on a grenade =

Act of deliberate self-sacrifice

Falling on a grenade is the deliberate act of using one's body to cover a live time-fused hand grenade, absorbing the explosion and fragmentation in an effort to save the lives of others nearby. Since this is almost universally fatal, it is considered an especially conspicuous and selfless act of individual sacrifice in wartime. In United States military history, more citations for the Medal of Honor, the country's highest military decoration, have been awarded for falling on grenades to save comrades than any other single act.

Such an act can be survivable: In World War I British soldier John Carmichael was awarded the Victoria Cross for saving his men by putting his steel helmet over a grenade and then standing on the helmet to reduce the blast damage. Carmichael survived although it was several years before he recovered sufficiently to be discharged from the hospital.

In World War II, U.S. Marine Jack Lucas, in the Battle of Iwo Jima, leapt onto an enemy grenade, jamming it into the volcanic ash and soft sand with his rifle and covering it with his body, while reaching out and pulling another one beneath him. One grenade exploded, severely injuring him and the other failed to detonate. Lucas lived, but spent the rest of his life with over 200 pieces of shrapnel in his body. In 2008 near Sangin in Afghanistan, British Royal Marine Matthew Croucher used his rucksack to pin a tripwire grenade to the floor. His body armour absorbed the majority of the blast.

In 1970 during the Vietnam War, Marine Allan J. Kellogg shoved a grenade into the mud and threw himself on top of it, yet survived.

On November 21, 2010, in Marjah, Helmand Province, Afghanistan in support of Operation Enduring Freedom, U.S. Marine Lance Corporal Kyle Carpenter threw himself upon a grenade, to save a fellow Marine in his sandbagged position, sustaining injuries to his face and right arm and losing his right eye. He survived these wounds. Despite these rare instances, the odds of survival are extremely slim. With modern medicine, however, odds are greatly increased when compared to falling on a grenade in the 20th century.

== See also ==
- Altruistic suicide
- Max Cleland
- Nathan Elbaz
- Human shield
- Roi Klein
- William McFadzean
- Michael A. Monsoor
- John Robert Osborn
- Yakov Novichenko
