= Baaz =

Baaz may refer to:

- Baaz Rockshelter, prehistoric archaeological site in Syria
- Baaz (1953 film), Indian Hindi-language film by Guru Dutt
- Baaz (1992 film), Indian Hindi-language film by S. Subhash
- Baaz: A Bird in Danger, 2003 Indiam Hindi-language action film by Tinnu Verma

== See also ==
- Baz (disambiguation)
