= Tapey =

Tibetan monk known for attempted self-immolation

Tapey (Tibetan: བློ་བཟང་བཀྲ་ཤིས།) was a young Tibetan monk from Kirti Monastery. On February 27, 2009, he attempted self-immolation in a public marketplace located in Sichuan to protest oppression by the PRC government in Ngawa, Tibet. Instead of helping him by putting out the fire, Chinese authorities shot him multiple times, and he succumbed to his injuries shortly after, which marked the beginning of a wave of Tibetan self-immolations.
