= Rong'an Township, Sichuan =

Rong'an Township 茸安乡
- Township
- Rong'an
- Location in Sichuan
- Coordinates: 32°31′41″N 101°36′11″E
- Country: People's Republic of China
- Province: Sichuan
- Autonomous prefecture: Ngawa Tibetan and Qiang Autonomous Prefecture
- County: Ngawa County

Area
  - Total: 1,020 km^{2} (390 sq mi)

Population (2010)
  - Total: 2,854
  - Density: 2.80/km^{2} (7.25/sq mi)
- Time zone: UTC+8 (China Standard)

Rong'an (Mandarin: 茸安乡) is a township in Ngawa County, Ngawa Tibetan and Qiang Autonomous Prefecture, Sichuan, China. In 2010, Rong'an Township had a total population of 2,854: 1,396 males and 1,458 females: 862 aged under 14, 1,764 aged between 15 and 65 and 228 aged over 65.
