= French blockade of the Río de la Plata =

1838-40 naval blockade of the Argentine Confederation by France

Coordinates: 34°36′13″S 58°22′54″W

- Part of the War of the Confederation and Guerra Grande
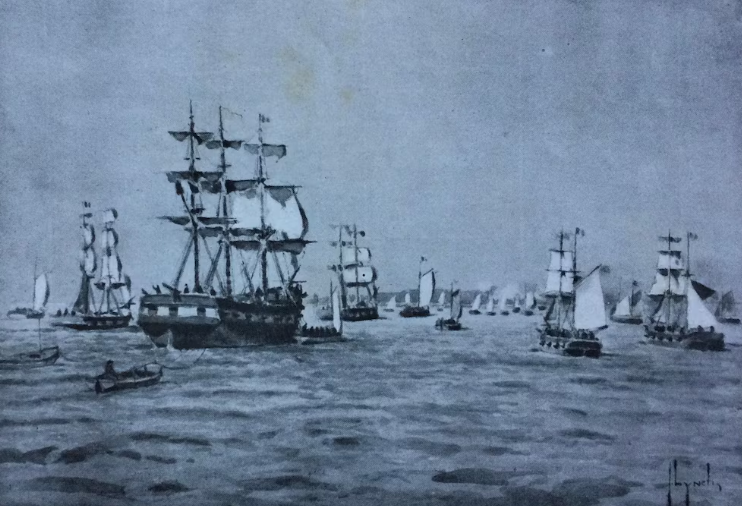
- The French fleet in the Rio de la Plata in full action
Date	28 March 1838 – 29 October 1840
Location	Río de la Plata
Result	Argentine victory: Mackau-Arana treaty

Belligerents
Argentina; Supported by: Blancos	France; Supported by: Unitarians; Colorados On war: Peru–Bolivian Confederation

The French blockade of the Río de la Plata was a two-year-long naval blockade imposed by France on the Argentine Confederation ruled by Juan Manuel de Rosas. It closed Buenos Aires to naval commerce. It was imposed in 1838 to support the Peru–Bolivian Confederation in the War of the Confederation, but continued after the end of the war. France did not land ground forces, but instead took advantage of the Uruguayan Civil War and the Argentine Civil Wars, supporting Fructuoso Rivera and Juan Antonio Lavalleja against Manuel Oribe and Rosas.

After two years without the expected results, France signed the Mackau-Arana treaty with the Argentine Confederation, ending the hostilities.

== Development ==
=== Start of the blockade ===
The Supreme Protector of the Peru–Bolivian Confederation, Andrés de Santa Cruz, supported free trade with Europeans, as well as the Unitarians, whereas Rosas was leader of the Federales. Rosas would later declare war against the Confederation for harboring Unitarian leaders. The war did not develop favorably for Argentina, and the French consul Aimé Roger went to Buenos Aires to request the capitulation of Argentina. He demanded that a pair of French citizens were released from prison. Those citizens were César Hipólito Bacle, who had sold Argentine cartography to Bolivia, and Pedro Lavié, who had stolen from a regiment in Dolores. It was also demanded that another pair were exempted from military service, and that France received the condition of "most favoured nation". This designation would provide commercial privileges, similar to those granted by Bernardino Rivadavia to Britain. Although the requests were light, Rosas believed that they would only provide precedent for further French interference in the internal affairs of Argentina, and refused to comply. As a result, France started a naval blockade over Buenos Aires. The French admiral Louis François Jean Leblanc started it on March 28, 1838.

Rosas took advantage of the British interests in the zone. The minister Manuel Moreno pointed out to the Foreign Office that the commerce between Argentina and Britain was being harmed by the French blockade, and that it would be a mistake for Britain to support it. France underestimated the chance of having such problems with its European ally, counting on the blockade being short and Rosas being forced to leave the government in a short time. They judged that the people would seize the opportunity to stand against Rosas, but underestimated his popularity. With the nation being threatened by both two European powers and two neighboring countries allied with them, patriotic loyalty increased to the point that even some notable Unitarians who had fled to Montevideo returned to the country to offer their military help, such as Soler, Lamadrid and Espinosa. José de San Martín, who was living in France, wrote a letter to Rosas pledging his full support. San Martín repudiated the Unitarians that allied themselves with a foreign country against their own nation, saying that "not even death can expunge such felony". He also offered his services to Rosas in the war, who declined due to San Martín being over sixty years old.

=== Attempts of secession ===
Things became more complicated for France as time passed: Andrés Santa Cruz was weakening, the strategy employed by Moreno was bearing fruit, and the French themselves started to have doubts about continuing a conflict that they had counted on being quite short. Even more, Britain would not allow the French to deploy troops, as they did not want a European competitor gaining territorial strength in the zone. Domingo Cullen, governor of Santa Fe (replacing the ill López,) considered Rosas to have nationalized a conflict that involved just Buenos Aires, and proposed to the French that Santa Fe, Córdoba, Entre Ríos and Corrientes secede, making a new country that would obey them if the naval blockade was spared to this new country. To complete the pincer movement, France would need another army attacking Rosas from the east. For this purpose France aided Fructuoso Rivera against the Uruguayan president Manuel Oribe, who was forced to resign. Oribe escaped to Buenos Aires, and Rosas received him as the legitimate president of Uruguay, denying such recognition to Rivera. France also took control of the strategic island Martín García.

The alliance between Cullen and Rivera did not take place, as Juan Pablo López, brother of Estanislao López, defeated Cullen and drove him away from the province. Cullen escaped to Córdoba and then to Santiago del Estero, but the governor Felipe Ibarra wanted to stay on good terms with Rosas, so he captured Cullen for him. In the north, Andrés Santa Cruz was defeated by the Chilean army at the Battle of Yungay, and the Peru–Bolivian Confederation ceased to exist. Now Rosas was free to focus all his attention towards the French blockade and Rivera.

=== Lavalle joins the war ===
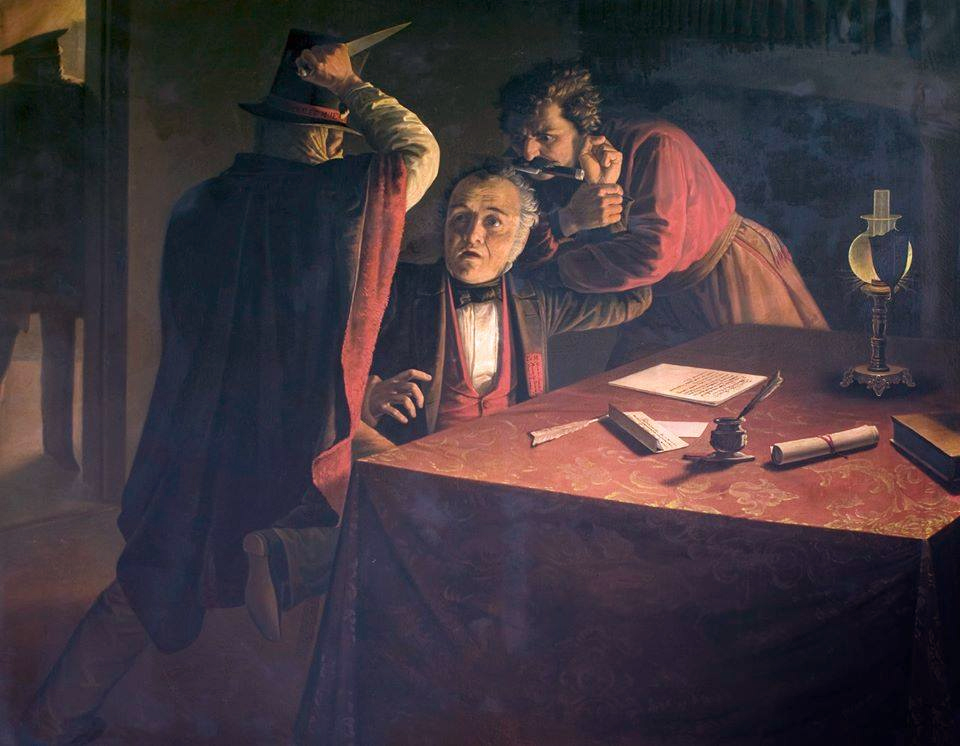
Death of Manuel Vicente Maza.

Rivera was urged by France to take military action against Rosas, but he was reluctant to do so, believing that the French underestimated his strength, even more so after Santa Cruz's defeat. On paper, Rivera was supposed to cross the Parana with 600 men, Entre Ríos would immediately join the resistance against Rosas and the army would grow to 6.000 men, then the same would happen in Santa Fe and the size of the army would be duplicated, and then it would attack Buenos Aires with support of the French navy, whose population would revolt against Rosas. The French and Unitarians believed in this scenario, but Rivera was aware that the popular support to Rosas was genuine, so sending a small army to Buenos Aires would be doomed to failure.

As Rivera did not take action, they elected Juan Lavalle to lead the attack, who shared the unitarian optimism on the fate of a small army. He requested not to share command with Rivera, and as a result they led both their own armies. His imminent attack was backed up by conspiracies in Buenos Aires, led by former members of the May Association. The most notable member of the conspiracy was Ramón Maza, son of the former governor Manuel Vicente Maza, who got military support. As Lavalle was delaying, they developed a new plan: Pedro Castelli and Nicolás Granada would make a revolt at Tapalqué, while the military in the city killed Rosas, Manuel Maza assumed government and allowed Lavalle to take the city. The plot was discovered by the Mazorca, but Rosas thought that Manuel Maza was innocent and carried to the plots of his son, so he urged him to leave the country. He could not: Martínez Fontes, one of the military talked into the plot, revealed it in public. Popular commotion was high, and the people took the streets demanding the execution of the people involved. Ramón Maza was executed, and his father was killed in his office by the Mazorca. Nevertheless, Pedro Castelli attempted to make a rebellion in the countryside. The people did not follow him, and he was executed as well.

=== Ending of the blockade ===
Tensions between Britain and France started to increase. Lord Sandon criticized France at the British Parliament on March 19, 1839. He said that France was attacking a foreign country just because it did not sign a treaty, and that it had toppled Oribe from power without being at war with Uruguay. Mr. Lushington added that the French pretensions were unjustified and would have never been enforced against a country with the means to defend itself.

Rosas did not wait to be attacked, and ordered Pascual Echagüe to cross the Parana and extend the war into Uruguay. The Uruguayan armies split: Rivera returned to defend Montevideo, and Lavalle moved to Entre Ríos alone. He called all people to stand against Rosas, regardless of color or political ideas, but he found severe resistance, so he moved to Corrientes to join governor Ferré. Ferré defeated López, and Rivera defeated Echagüe, leaving Lavalle a clear path towards Buenos Aires. However, by that point France had lost faith in the effectiveness of the blockade, as what was thought to be an easy and short conflict was turning into a long war, without a clear path toward a final victory. The admiral Leblanc was replaced by Dupotet, with new orders to negotiate peace with the Confederation in an honorable way. Those negotiations would include the British ambassador Mandeville. As part of the peace treaty, France requested again the status of "most favoured nation" of the initial request, but allowing for a similar status for the Confederation by France.

As a result, France ceased financial support to Lavalle. He didn't find help at local towns either, and there was heavy desertion in his ranks. Buenos Aires was ready to resist his military attack, but the lack of support forced him to give it up and retire from the battlefield, without starting any battle. His army escaped to the north in disorder, and he died in a confusing episode at San Salvador de Jujuy.

== French order of battle ==
- Minerve
- Expéditive
- D’Assas
- Alerte
- Camille
- Bordelaise
- Vigilante
- Éclair
- Forte
- Lutin
- Sylphe

== See also ==
- Argentine Civil Wars
- Uruguayan Civil War
- Anglo-French blockade of the Río de la Plata

== Bibliography ==
- Galasso, Norberto (2009). Seamos libres y lo demás no importa nada (in Spanish). Buenos Aires: Colihue. ISBN 978-950-581-779-5.
- Luna, Félix (2004). Grandes protagonistas de la historia Argentina: Juan Manuel de Rosas (in Spanish). Buenos Aires: La Nación. ISBN 950-49-1251-6.
- Affaires de Buénos-Ayres, un Officier de la flotte. Revue des Deux Mondes 4ème série, tome 25, 1841
