= Nathan Elbaz =

Israel Defense Force soldier (1932–1954)

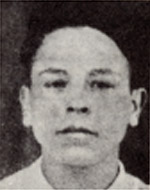
Nathan Elbaz

Nathan Elbaz (Hebrew: נתן אלבז; 17 October 1932 – 11 February 1954) was an Israel Defense Forces soldier who sacrificed his life for his friends, receiving the Medal of Distinguished Service.

== Biography ==
Honor guard at Elbaz's funeral.

Elbaz was born in Morocco, to a Jewish family. He attended Hebrew school, and he and his friends dreamed of making aliyah. After the establishment of Israel in 1948, Elbaz and his friends were determined to move there. When he was 18, he left for Israel as part of Aliyat HaNoar ("Youth Aliyah").

Elbaz was inducted into the IDF in 1952 and served in the Infantry Corps. During his service, he was entrusted with the task of disassembling hand grenades. On 11 February 1954, Elbaz and another soldier were disassembling grenades, when a grenade he was holding was accidentally activated. He immediately called out a warning to his comrades to take shelter, but when he saw that there was no way to throw the grenade without endangering them, he ran away from them, pressing it to his chest and was thus killed. For this action he received a posthumous citation from chief of staff Moshe Dayan. The citation was replaced with the Medal of Distinguished Service, after the latter was established in 1970.

=== Commemoration ===
The poet Natan Alterman published a poem praising his heroism. Amos Ettinger also wrote a poem in his memory, called "Nathan Natan". The song was composed and performed by Joe Amar.

Streets in Israeli cities were named after him: Tel Aviv, Haifa, Petah Tikva, Ashdod, Herzliya, Lod, Tirat Carmel, Kiryat Gat, Shlomi, Kiryat Ata, Ramla and Sderot. In addition, a synagogue and garden "Natan Elbaz" in the city of Dimona were named after him.
