= Baz Nagle =

Canadian football player (1933–1997)

Profile
- Positions: Halfback, Defensive back

Personal information
- Born: April 5, 1933; Vancouver, British Columbia, Canada
- Died: April 11, 1997 (aged 64)
- Listed height: 5 ft 11 in (1.80 m)
- Listed weight: 185 lb (84 kg)

Career history
- 1954–1957: Calgary Stampeders
- 1957–1962: BC Lions
- 1961: Winnipeg Blue Bombers

Awards and highlights
- Grey Cup champion (1961)

Douglas Basil Nagle (April 5, 1933 – April 11, 1997) was a Canadian professional football player who played for the Winnipeg Blue Bombers, Calgary Stampeders and BC Lions. He won the Grey Cup with Winnipeg in 1961. He died of liver failure in 1997.
