= Baz, Iran =

Baz باز
- Village
- Location within Iran
- Coordinates: 31°30′39″N 53°50′56″E
- Country: Iran
- Province: Yazd
- County: Taft
- Bakhsh: Central
- Rural District: Dehshir

Population (2006)
  - Total: 129
- Time zone: UTC+3:30 (IRST)
  - Summer (DST): UTC+4:30 (IRDT)

Baz (Persian: باز, also Romanized as Bāz) is a village in Dehshir Rural District, in the Central District of Taft County, Yazd province, Iran. At the 2006 census, its population was 129, in 50 families.
