= Ignacio Baz =

Argentine painter

- Born: 1826; San Miguel de Tucumán, Argentina
- Died: 1887

Ignacio Baz (1826–1887) was an Argentine painter who painted many portraits of notable people in the region during his lifetime.

== Life ==
Ignacio Baz was born in San Miguel de Tucumán in 1826 and died in 1887. He was a disciple, alongside Fernando García del Molino and Eustaquio Carrandi, of the renowned painter Carlos Morel.

== Work ==
Baz portrayed great personalities in Tucumán, Córdoba, Buenos Aires, Santiago, Chile and Lima, Peru. He also made portraits of caudillos such as Juan Manuel de Rosas, Juan Felipe Ibarra, Facundo Quiroga and Ángel Vicente Peñaloza.

When his niece offered a collection of his work for sale to state in 1904, the Senator for Tucumán Province, Alberto Soldati, spoke in favor of the purchase, saying Ignacio Baz was one of the greatest of national portrait artists. His portraits, painted over a period of forty years, were striking resemblances of the most distinguished members of the leading families in the provinces of North and many of Cordoba and the coast". His works may be seen at the Museum of Fine Arts Eduardo Sivori, shown by Rodolfo Trostiné (Buenos Aires) and the Museum of Fine Arts "Timoteo Eduardo Navarro" (City of Tucumán)

== Gallery ==
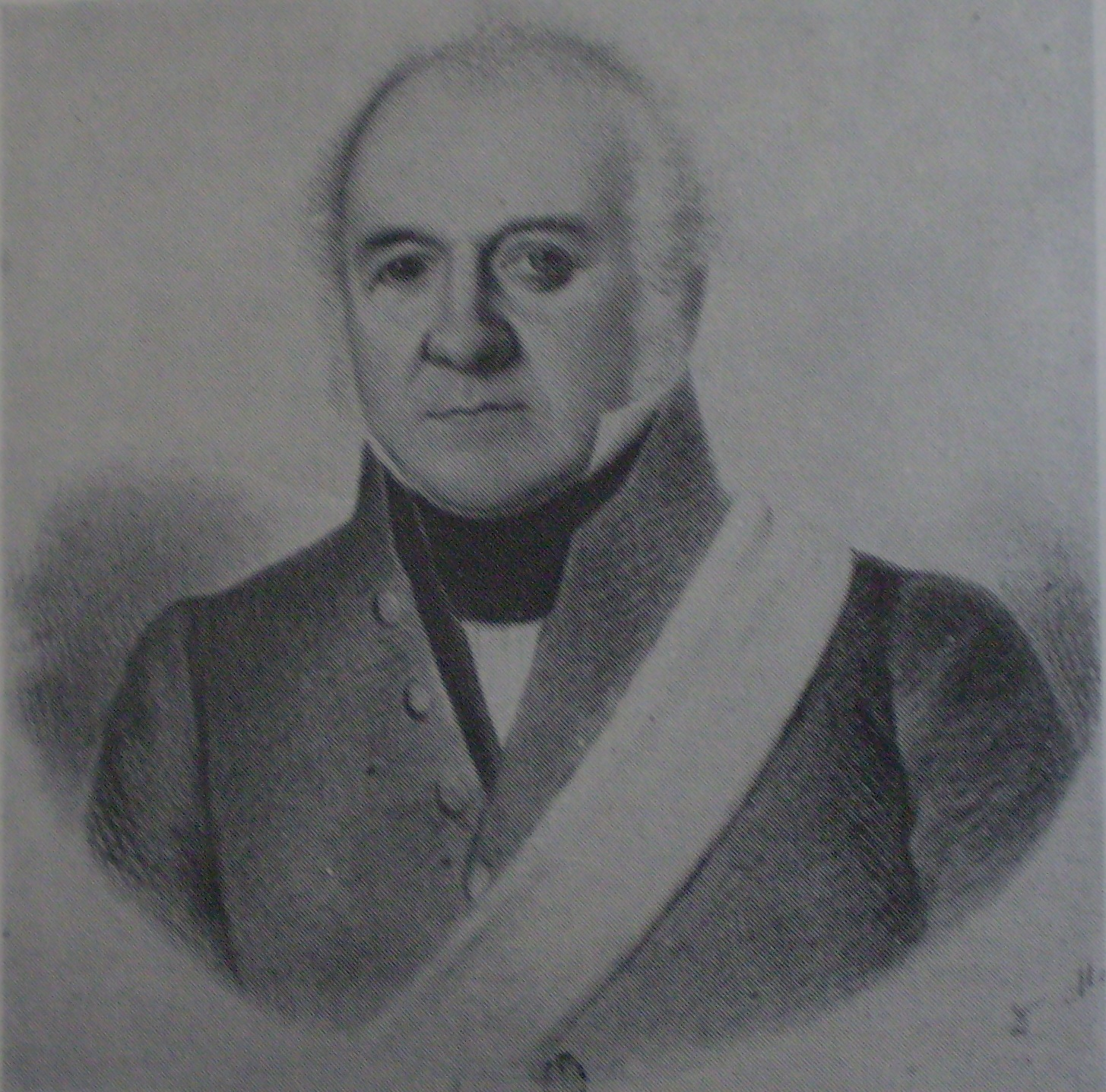
Manuel Vicente Maza. Original in the Museo Histórico Nacional

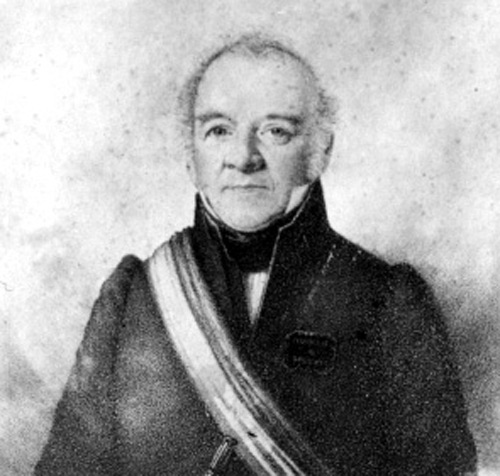
Manuel Vicente Maza, Argentine lawyer and politician

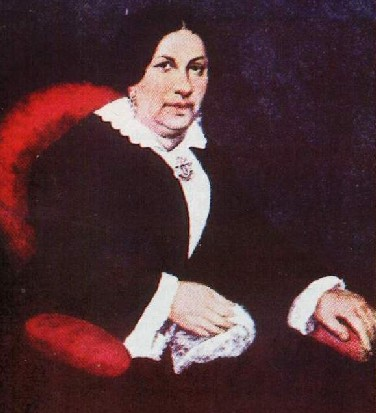
Portrait of Doña Josefa Romero Urrea de Nougués

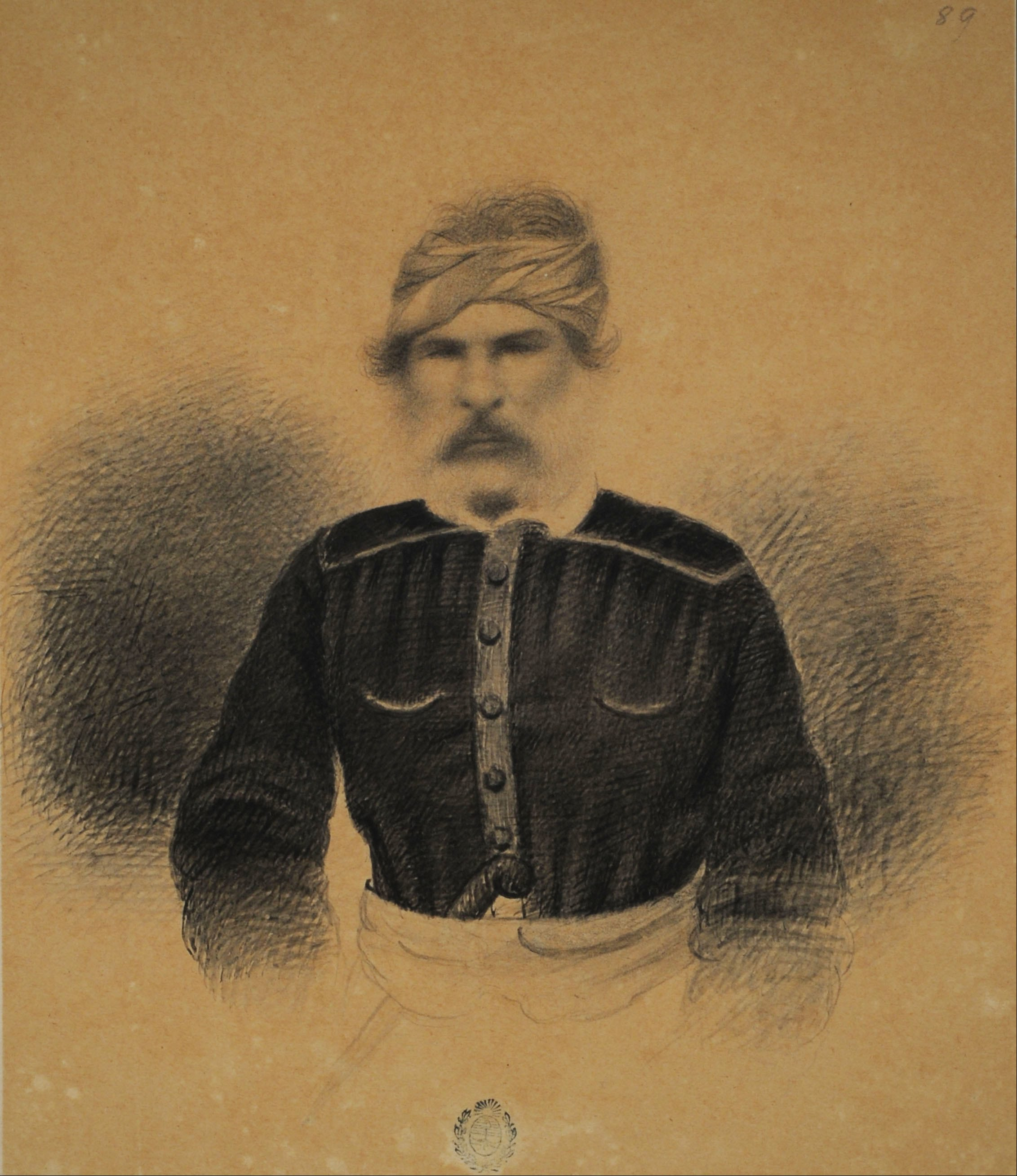
El Chacho (Angel V. Peñaloza)

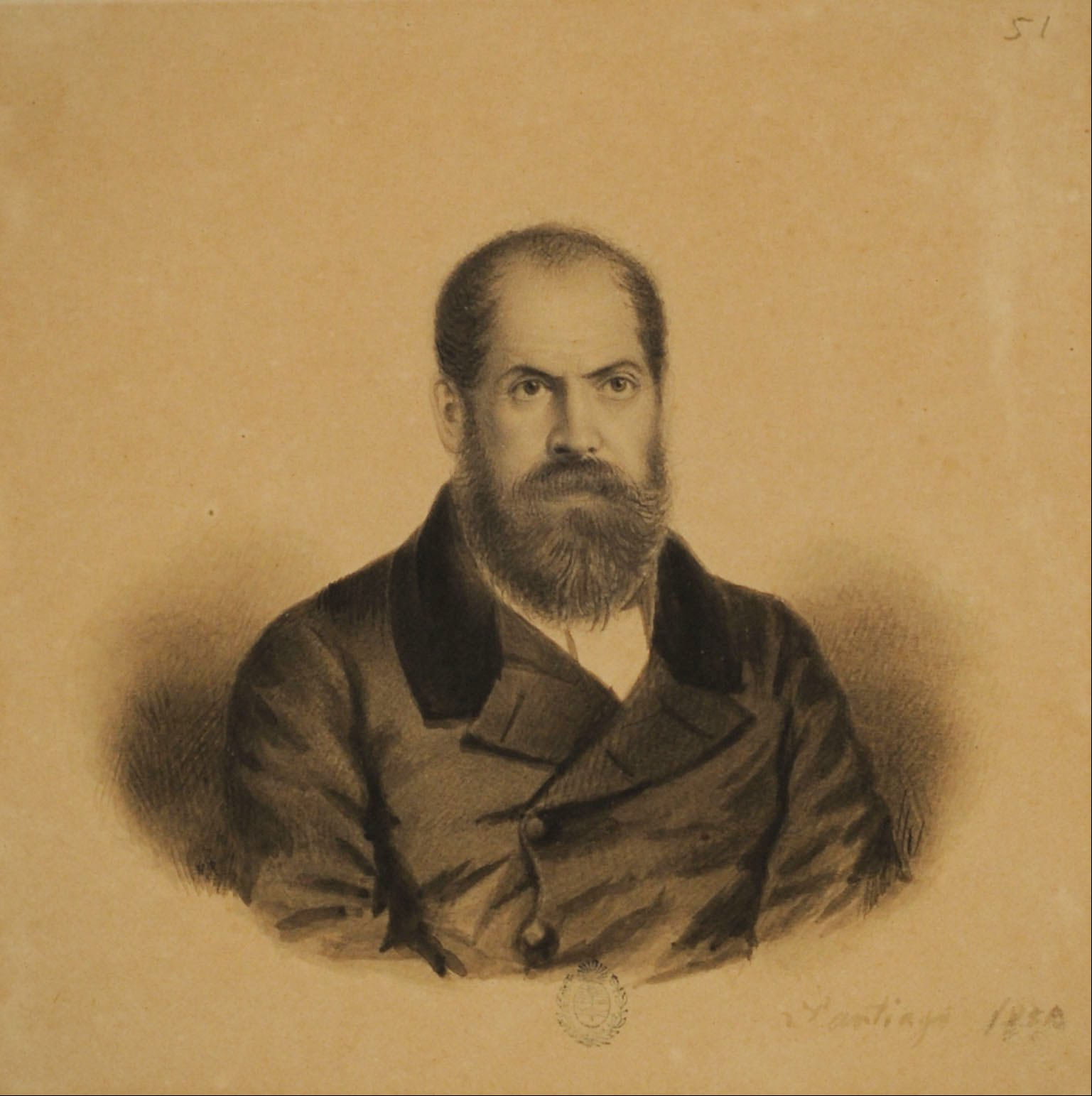
Domingo Faustino Sarmiento
