= Ngawa Town =

Town in Sichuan, China

Coordinates: 32°54′N 101°42′E

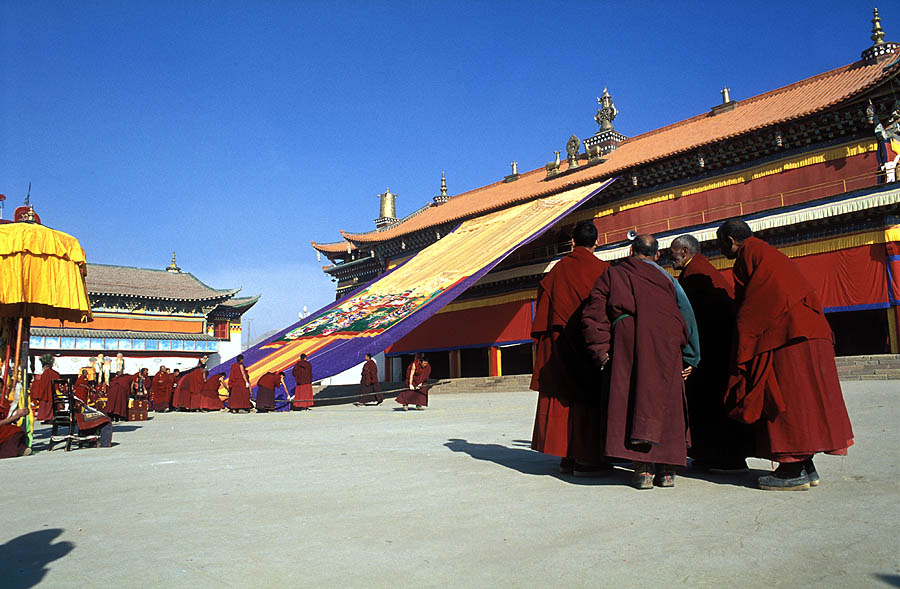
Kirti Gompa or Gerdeng Monastery, the largest Tibetan Monastery in Aba (Ngawa) Tibetan and Qiang Autonomous Prefecture in Sichuan Province, China

Ngawa or Aba town (Chinese: 阿坝镇; pinyin: Ābà Zhèn Standard Tibetan: Ngawa) is the seat of Ngawa (Aba) County, within the Ngawa (Aba) Tibetan and Qiang Autonomous Prefecture in northwestern Sichuan, China. It is located on the Tibetan Plateau at an elevation of 3,200 metres (10,500 ft). The city is about 75 km (47 mi) from Jigdril, 254 km from Barkham (Ma'erkang) and 157 km (98 mi) from Mewa (Hongyuan).

Ngawa (Aba) town has about 14,000 inhabitants as of 2009. There are 37 monasteries and nunneries in the area, two of the largest in Ngawa (Aba) town itself. There are mainly grasslands and forested valleys in the south.

== Culture ==
Aba County is mainly inhabited by Tibetans. The major festivals are:

- Great Prayer Festival: January 8 to January 15 according to the Tibetan calendar
- Six-Four Festival: June 11 to June 17 according to the Tibetan calendar
- Zachong Festival: September 15 to September 17 according to the lunar calendar
- Horse Race Festival: Middle of July according to the lunar calendar

== Monasteries and Nunneries ==
- Kirti Gompa, (sometimes referred to as Gerdeng Monastery), properly known as Kirti Kalari Gon Tashi Lhundrub, is a Gelugpa monastery on the northwestern edge of the town. It was founded in 1472 by Rongpa Chenakpa, a disciple of Tsongkhapa. Although the monastery previously housed about 2500 monks, following mass arrests and patriotic re-education efforts by Chinese authorities, only about 600 monks remain.
- Nangzhik Gompa and Topgyel are both Bon monasteries northeast of the town.
- Setenling Gompa is a Buddhist monastery of the Jonangpa tradition about a kilometre from the eastern end of the town. It was founded by Namnang Dorje in the 13th-14th centuries and reconstituted in the late 19th century by Dro-ge Yonten Gyatso.
- Mani Nunnery
- Dragkar Nunnery

"There are many monasteries scattered around the town, and they are all worth visiting."

== Transport ==
Aba County is well connected to many provincial towns and cities. Aba is the biggest transport hub within the prefecture. There are long haul buses heading for Aba from Chengdu City, Mianyang City, Songpan County, Ma'er Kang County, Jinchuan County, Wenchuan County, Hongyuan County, Heishui County and Xiangtang County daily.

== Attractions ==
- Jiuzhaigou Valley - National Park
- Huanglong Valley - scenic spot very close by
- Wolong Nature Reserve - China's largest natural habitat for giant pandas
- Miyaluo - scenic spot
- Shrine honoring Pelgon Trinle Rabten, a ruler of the Meu Kingdom.

== See also ==
- Self-immolation protests by Tibetans in China
