= Mar Narsai D'Baz =

Eastern Christian bishop (1940–2010)

- Title: Metropolitan Bishop of Lebanon, Syria, and Europe

Personal life
- Born: May 17, 1940 Tel-Rumman, Al-Hasakah, Syria
- Died: February 14, 2010 (aged 69) Scottsdale, Arizona

Religious life
- Religion: Assyrian Church of the East

Senior posting
- Based in: Beirut, Lebanon

Mar Narsai D'Baz (Syriac: ܡܪܝ ܢܪܣܝ ܕܒܙ; May 17, 1940 – February 14, 2010) was the Metropolitan of Lebanon, Syria and all Europe in the Assyrian Church of the East. Born on May 17, 1940, to Rev. Elias De Baz in the village of Tel-Rumman Foqani in Syria. Ordained Bishop of Lebanon at Beirut on July 18, 1968. Elevated to the rank of Metropolitan at London on October 17, 1976. He died on February 14, 2010, in Scottsdale, Arizona, and his last rites were given at Mar Gewargis Cathedral and buried in Chicago, Illinois.

== See also ==
- Assyrian Church of the East
- Assyrian Church of the East's Holy Synod
