= André Elbaz =

Moroccan painter and film maker

- Born: 26 April 1934 (age 91); El Jadida
- Citizenship: Canada, France, Morocco
- Occupations: Film director, Painter

André Elbaz (born April 26, 1934, El Jadida, Morocco) is a Moroccan painter and filmmaker.

== Biography ==
Born to a Jewish family, Elbaz studied art and theatre in Rabat and Paris from 1950 to 1961. He started painting only at the age of 21, until which age he had been interested mainly in theatre. A few years later, he managed to combine his two passions into a new approach in art-therapy, inventing together with his wife, a psychiatrist, the Pictodrame, which brought him world recognition.

His first exhibition, which was very successful, took place in Casablanca in 1961 and earned him an appointment as Professor at the Beaux-Arts school in Casablanca. Years later, in 1976, he exhibited his paintings at the Tel-Aviv Museum.

In parallel to his career as a painter, Elbaz is also known as a filmmaker. He produced several short films in France, Canada and the United States. One of them, La nuit n'est jamais complète (The night is never complete), won a prize at the "5th Biennale de Paris in 1967" . Among the themes chosen for the many films he produced, there was a short one about the Warsaw Ghetto uprising, as well as a series of drawings entitled Seuls (Alone), with texts written by both Elie Wiesel and Naim Kattan. Both the short movie and the drawings were a result of his fascination by Holocaust related themes. This fascination also inspired him for other works that were shown at an exhibition at Yad Vashem in Jerusalem, in 1985. His paintings are famous for boasting traditional Jewish themes and he often present them in a chiefly expressionist style.

A retrospective of his lifetime achievements and works was held in 1990 at the Georges Pompidou Center in Paris.

== Profile ==
=== Studies ===
- Graphic Arts and Theatre

=== One man show ===
- 2006 - Retrospective of works from 1986-2005 in Morocco. Rabat/Casablanca (Institut Français), El Jadida (Salle Chaïbia), Fès (Musée Batha)
- 2001 - Remember for the Future Maison Française, Oxford - Galerie La Croix Baragnon, Toulouse
- 2000 - Cinq triptyques en guise de perspective - Mémorial du CDJC, Paris
- 1999 - Le Défit à la Barbarie, Musée Départemental, Epinal- Bibliothèque de l'A.I.U. Parris
- 1993 - Cegep Saint Laurent, Montréal
- 1992 - Sala dei Congressi, Milano; Casa della Cultura, Livorno - Carlton Center, Ottawa; Jewish Public Library, Montréal
- 1990 - Biennale du Film d'Art, Centre Pompidou, Paris
- 1990 - Seïbu Gallery, Tokyo
- 1989 - Nishi-Azabu; Azakloth Gallery, Tokyo
- 1985 - Musée d'Art, Yad Vashem, Jérusalem
- 1984 - Galerie Aut der Land, Munich
- 1976 - Musée de Tel Aviv
- - La Rotonde, Aix-en-Provence; Centre Edmond Fleg, Marseille
- - Château de Herbeys, Grenoble
- 1975 - Centre Rachi, Paris
- 1972 - Albert White Gallery, Toronto
- 1970 - Terre des Hommes, Montréal
- 1969 - Waddington Gallery, Montréal
- 1965 - Centre Culturel Français, Casablanca
- 1964 - Zwemmer Gallery, Londres
- 1962-63-1965 - Musée de Bab Rouah, Rabat
- 1960 - Balliol College, Oxford

=== Awards ===
- 1998 - Prix Mémoire de la Shoah - Fondation du Judaïsme Français
- 1968 - La Nuit n'est jamais complète Lauréat du court métrage - Vème Biennale de Paris.

=== Salons ===
- 1973 - Jean Paulhan à travers ses peintres
- 1968 - Nuit Culturelle de Nancy avec Roêl d'Haese, Pierre Schaeffer, René de Obaldia Esposito, Piem.
- 1961-1963-1965-1967 - Biennales de Paris, Musée d'Art Moderne
- 1955-1959 - Salon des Surindépendants - Salon de l'Ecole Française - Salon d'Hiver
- Salon de la jeune Peinture - Musée d'Art Moderne - Paris

=== Short films and animations ===
- 1972 - Histoire d'œufs, animation at Montreal
- 1971 - Regard sur la Peinture Américaine, Whitney Museum, New York
- 1970 - L'homme à la Bouteille, Created at the NFB in Montreal at the request of Norman McLaren - Les Mobiles chez Calder at MOMA New York
- 1969 - Graphiques for " Kaddish " by Léonard Bernstein
- 1966 - La Nuit n'est Jamais Complète, Oratorio "A Survivor from Warsaw " Arnold Schöenberg, Service de la Recherche de l'ORTF - represents France at the Festival du Court-Métrage in Tours

=== Films ===
- 1971 - Seuls, Portfolio of 20 sérigraphies, Texts from Elie Wiesel & Naïm Kattan.
- 1991 - De feu et d'exil, Portefolio of 20 serigraphies on the theme of the l'Inquisition, texts from François-Marc Gagnon, Shmuel Trigano & Naïm Kattan
