= Kirti Gompa =

Tibetan Buddhist monastery in Ngawa, Sichuan, China

- Tibetan transcription(s); Tibetan: ཀི་རྟི་དགོན་པ།
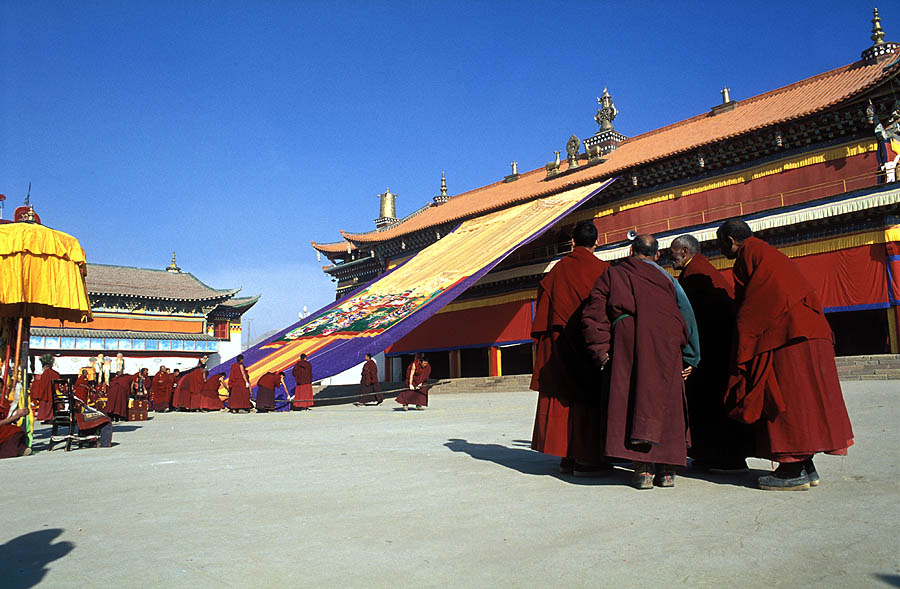
- Kirti Gompa or Gerdeng Monastery.

- Location within Sichuan

Religion
- Affiliation: Tibetan Buddhism
- Sect: Gelugpa
- Leadership: Twelfth Kirti Tsenzhab Rinpoche

Location
- Location: Ngawa Tibetan and Qiang Autonomous Prefecture, Sichuan Province of China, known as Kham.
- Country: China
- Coordinates: 32°54′N 101°42′E

Architecture
- Founder: Rongpa Chenakpa
- Established: 1472; 554 years ago

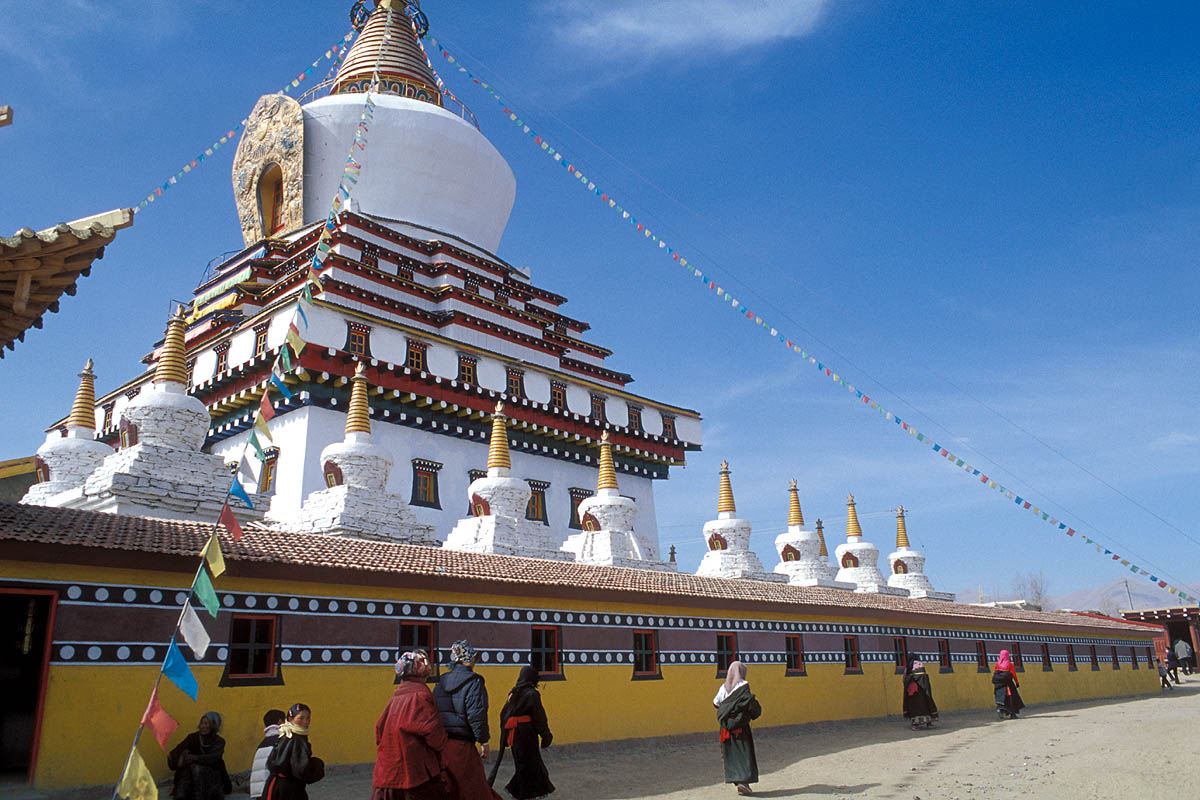
The great stupa at Kirti Monastery, Ngawa, Sichuan

Kirti Gompa (Tibetan: ཀི་རྟི་དགོན་པ།, Wylie: ki rti dgon pa), is a Tibetan Buddhist monastery founded in 1472 and located in Ngawa, Sichuan province, in China, but traditionally part of Amdo region. Numerous other associated Kirti monasteries and nunneries are located nearby. As of March 2011, the Kirti Gompa was said to house 2,500 monks. Between 2008 and 2011, mass arrests and patriotic re-education programs by Chinese authorities have targeted the monks, reducing the population substantially to 600 monks. The wave of Tibetan self-immolations began at Kirti Gompa.

== History ==
Kirti Gompa was founded in 1472 by Rongpa Chenakpa, a disciple of Tsongkhapa. It was established as a branch of Taktsang Lhamo Kirti Gompa (Nama Ge’erde Si) near the border with Gansu Province in 1693 but has outgrown its mother monastery.

The first Kirti Monastery founded by lama Kirti Rinpoche was in Gyelrang. These days the two main Kirti Monasteries are in Ngawa town and Taktsang Lhamo in Zoige county, both in Ngawa prefecture, in Sichuan, China. Taktsang Lhamo was destroyed during the Cultural revolution and has now been rebuilt. There are numerous (approximately 30–40) smaller monasteries affiliated with the Kirti Monasteries spread throughout the region.

The 11th Kirti Tsenzhab Rinpoche was born in 1926 and moved to Lhasa in 1957 and accompanied the Dalai Lama into exile in India in 1959. During a period of relative freedom in China, in 1984 he visited the People's Republic as the head of a delegation from the Tibetan Government-in-Exile, meeting Chinese government representatives in Beijing and touring Tibetan regions, including Ngawa. However, after the hardening of Chinese government policy in the aftermath of the Tiananmen Square protests of 1989, relations between Beijing and Dharamsala soured, and he founded a Kirti Monastery in Dharamsala in India in April 1990, with monks coming across the border to join the new monastery. He died in 2006. The current, 12th Kirti Rinpoche, born in 1940, is the 55th lama to head the monastery.

== Ngawa Kirti Gompa ==
Ngawa Kirti Gompa (sometimes referred to as Ge’erdengsi or Gerdeng Monastery), properly known as Kirti Kalari Gon Tashi Lhundrub, is a Gelugpa monastery on the northwestern edge of Ngawa City, the main city in Ngawa County, within the Ngawa Tibetan and Qiang Autonomous Prefecture in northwestern Sichuan, China. It is located on the Tibetan Plateau at an elevation of 3,200 metres (10,499 ft.)

Outside the north wall of the monastery is a towering statue of Shakyamuni Buddha. The imposing Assembly Hall or Tensi Dratsang (Dialectical College) has 120 pillars. It contains an 8-metre (26 ft) statue of Maitreya, flanked by Jowo Shakyamuni and Kirti Lobzang Chungla. There are also several other important buildings including: the Chokhang (Offering Chapel), the Lhabrang or residence of Kirti Rinpoche, the Zhungkhang (Monastic Office), the Gyupa Dratsang (Tantric College), the Menpa Dratsang (Medical College), and the Dukhor Dratsang (Kalacakra College).

Kirti Gompa is also famous for its 30-metre (98-ft) high white chorten known as the Dudul Chorten which has numerous chapels on the various floors respectively dedicated to Shakyamuni Buddha, Mahakarunika, and the Three Deities of Longevity, Tsongkhapa and Sitatapatra. It is the largest Tibetan Monastery in Ngawa Town and was established by the Buddhist Youth School, which was closed by Chinese authorities.

== Taksang Lhamo Kirti Gompa ==
The Taksang Lhamo Kirti Gompa monastery is located in Zoigê County, Sichuan Province. It has approximately 700 monks in residence.

== Kirti Jepa Datsang Gompa ==
Kirti Jepa Datsang Gompa is located in Dharamsala, India. It was built in 1992 to house monks exiled from Tibet. Today, the monks number approximately 200 and include Kirti Rinpoche.

== Darjeeling Kirti Gompa ==
Darjeeling Kirti Gompa is a small Kirti monastery in Darjeeling, India with approximately 40 monks.

== Ceremonies ==
New Year (Losar) Festivals in the first Lunar month include masked dances and the display of a large thangka. As part of the Monlam Festival there is a ceremony for "Sunning the Buddha", and a big thangka of Tsongkhapa is displayed on a huge Thangka Wall behind the monastery. This Khakhl Sham (Appliqué Tangkha Show) was first held in 1468 by the First Dalai Lama, Gendun Drub (1391–1474). Originally the thangka was smaller, but after the 4th Panchen Lama, Lobzang Chokyi Gyeltsen (1567–1662), the size was increased more and more until it reached its present dimensions.

== Recent events ==
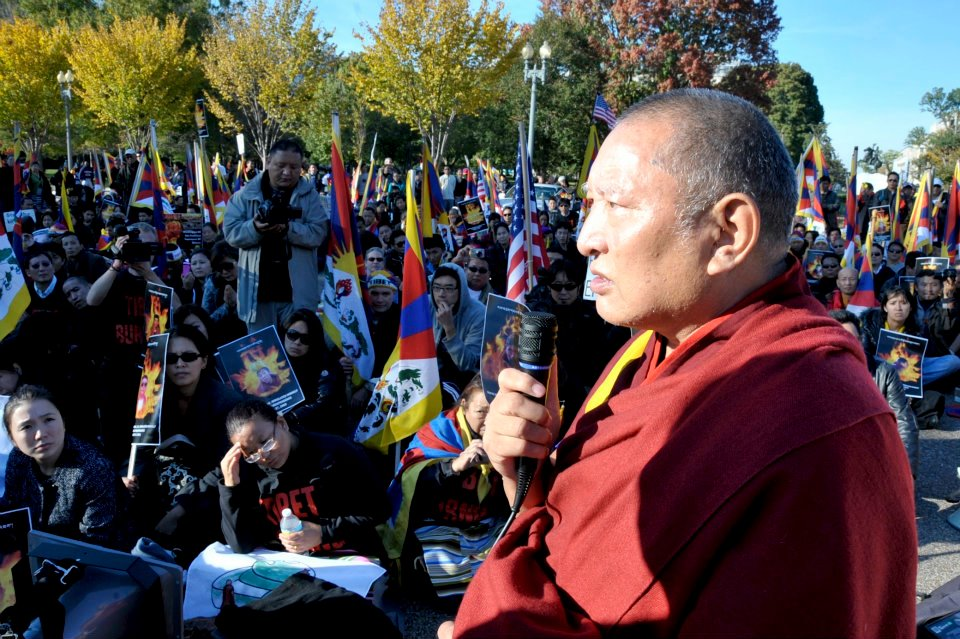
Kirti Rinpoche speaks at a demonstration in Washington, 2011

The Ngaba Kirti Gompa monastery is at the center of Tibetan self-immolations. Of the self-immolations, the monastery's spiritual master the 12th Kirti Rinpoche has said sacrificing one’s life to defend one’s Buddhist beliefs is not considered violent, and "Throughout your successive rebirths, never relax your vigilance in upholding the truth of the Buddha’s excellent teaching for a single moment, even at the cost of your own life."

Ngaba Kirti Gompa is under close supervision by the Chinese People's Armed Police. On 16 March 2008, more than 3,300 monks and nuns from the Kirti monastic centers participated in the 2008 Tibetan uprising anniversary demonstrations, after which 27 nuns were arrested, and Chinese forces admitted to firing weapons. Between 13 and 30 people were reportedly killed, and the nuns were not heard from after the arrests.

Raids at several Kirti monastic centers were reported by the Tibetan Centre for Human Rights and Democracy (TCHRD) and more than 572 monks were arbitrarily arrested by the People's Armed Police and the Public Security Bureau during the raids on 28–29 March 2008. The TCHRD also reports at least 23 people were killed and hundreds critically wounded during the demonstrations of 16 March. Chinese authorities intensified their local crackdowns afterwards.

The first self-immolation in Tibet was by a monk from the Ngaba Kirti Gompa, Tapey, on 27 February 2009. Accounts differ as to his condition, as some state he survived while other eyewitness reports, including the Self-immolation Fact Sheet from International Campaign for Tibet, state that when Tapey "began to shout slogans (no details are yet known of what he said), People’s Armed Police (PAP) personnel stationed nearby opened fire, and Tapey fell to the ground. Reports indicate that the PAP extinguished the fire after Tapey was shot and he was immediately taken away by police."

In early 2011, Kirti monks were sent to Chinese re-education programs, which the United Nations Commission on Human Rights questioned. Then on 16 March 2011, a 24-year-old monk named Phuntsog died in a hospital after setting himself on fire in protest against Chinese rule, three years after the demonstrations during the 2008 Tibetan uprising anniversary. On 19 March, Chinese authorities suspended the monastery's spiritual practices. On 20 March, Chinese officials were visiting households and inquiring about monks as family members.

Thubtem Samphel, a spokesperson for the Tibetan government-in-exile's Central Tibetan Administration, told the BBC that Tibetan Buddhism did not condone violence against other people or oneself. He added "Whatever the reason for this, it's a very strong and desperate indication that the people there are totally unhappy,"

Tibetan residents began a demonstration at the Public Security Bureau which turned deadly. At the monastery, monks were arrested, then more than 1,000 Tibetans gathered to demonstrate as protests and arrests in the area continued. Three more monks from the monastery were arrested on 8 April, and on 9 April, the monastery was surrounded by about 800 troops and no one was allowed to enter or leave the grounds. The monks ran short of food and supplies as Chinese forces had walled off the monastery and prevented local Tibetans from offering food. Forces also built stations in the monastery, halted more spiritual practices, and beat monks outside of their rooms.

In response and to protect the monks during the siege, local Tibetans surrounded the Chinese forces and blocked the roads to prevent Chinese vehicles from entering or leaving Kirti Gompa.

The 14th Dalai Lama issued an appeal on 15 April 2011 to both sides and to the international community, citing the situation at Kirti Monastery and the self-immolations, and describing the standoff between the Chinese forces and the Tibetan people. The Dalai Lama later said the self-immolations were the result of "Some kind of policy, some kind of cultural genocide is taking place".

A report by the International Campaign for Tibet states 300 monks were taken away on 21 April 2011 by paramilitary police who also severely beat a group of laypeople standing vigil outside the monastery, killing two old women and badly wounding other protesters. The 300 monks were hauled into 10 military trucks and forcibly disappeared, while the United Nations Working Group on Enforced or Involuntary Disappearances pressed China to disclose their whereabouts.

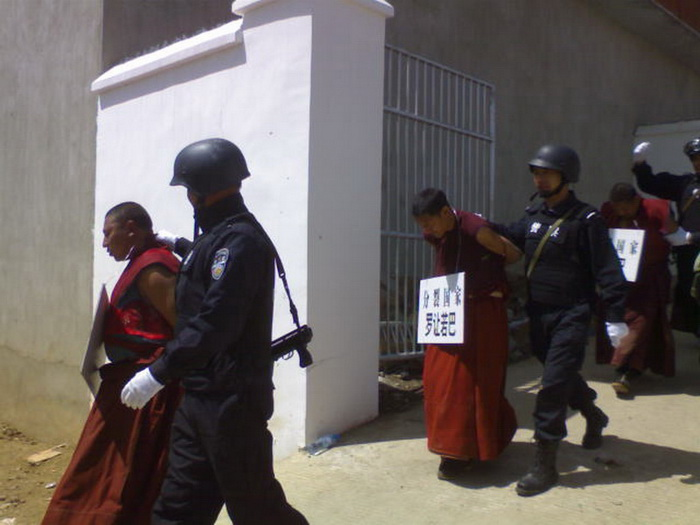
Tibetan monks arrested and exhibited in Ngaba

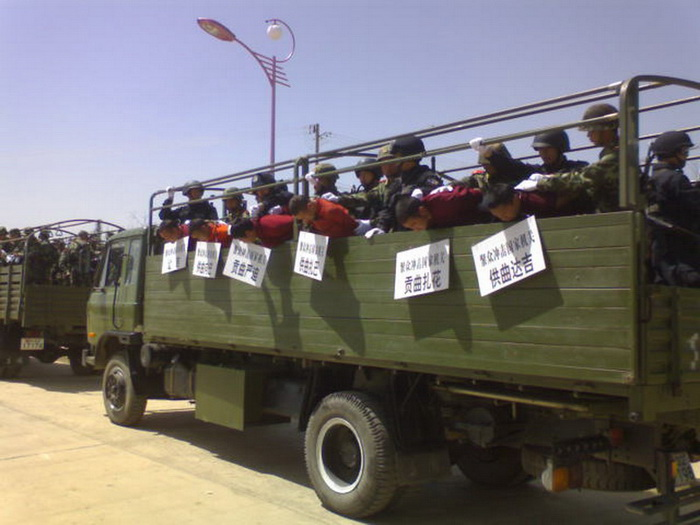
Tibetan monks and laypeople arrested in Ngaba

The BBC reported in October 2011 on a spate of self-immolations at the monastery by monks and nuns protesting PRC rule and the accompanying restrictions on human rights and religious freedom. Included among the victims was 17-year-old Kelsang Wangchuk, who self-immolated on 3 October. On 17 October, a Buddhist nun named Tenzin Wangmo became the first female self-immolation victim in Aba, and the ninth of the year.

In response to the rise in protests, PRC authorities reportedly detained some monks in compulsory reeducation-through-labour and detention facilities, leading the monastery's population to decline from 2,500 to 600, from March to October 2011. Police and military surveillance in the area has escalated, and some monks have been sentenced to prison

Another report by the International Campaign for Tibet states the frequency of self-immolations in Ngaba lessened from 2014 to 2018, then solo protests began by those often carrying outlawed images of the Dalai Lama along a road where many self-immolations occurred. The road is called "Heroes, or Martyrs, Street" by the monks.

Arrests of monks at Ngawa Kirti Gompa continued in 2017 and 2018, after which three monks, Thubpa, Lobsang Dorje, and Lobsang Thamke, were reported to have disappeared into Chinese custody.
