= Ngawa County =

Ngawa County 阿坝县 • རྔ་བ་རྫོང་། • Rrmeabba Ngaba, Aba
- County
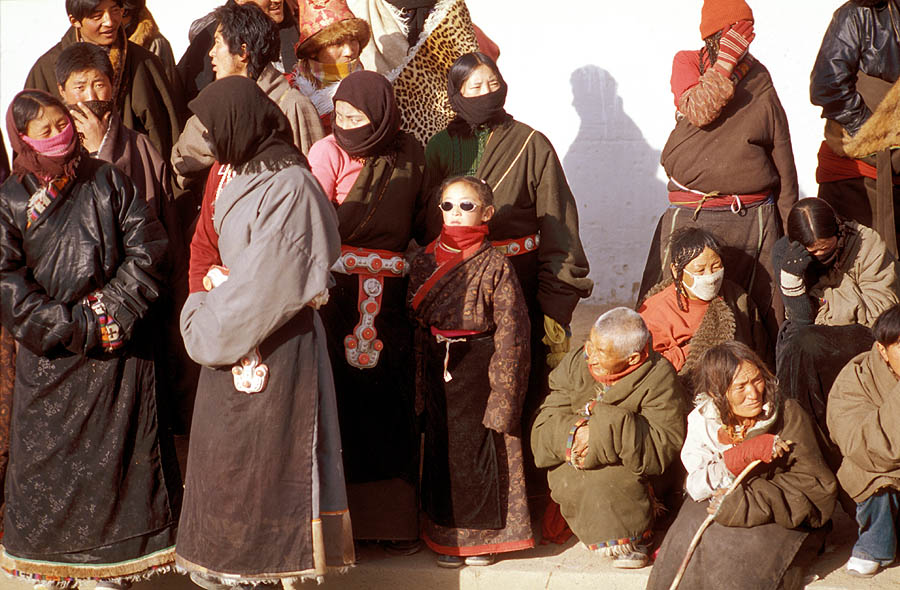
- People of Ngawa County

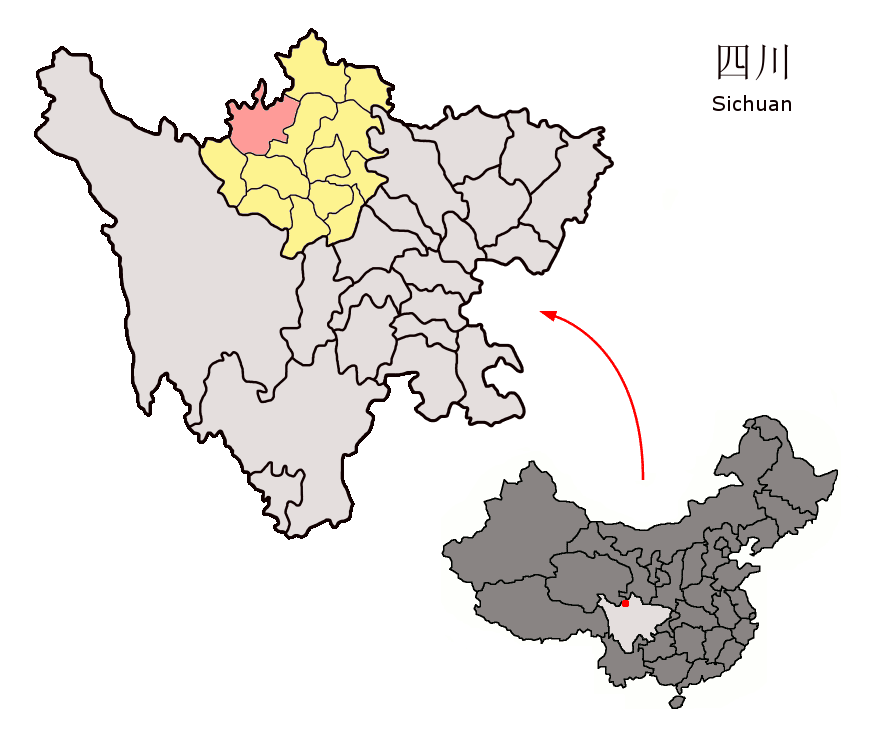
- Location of Ngawa County (red) within Ngawa Prefecture (yellow) and Sichuan

- Location of the seat in Sichuan Ngawa (China)
- Coordinates: 32°54′N 101°42′E
- Country: China
- Province: Sichuan
- Autonomous prefecture: Ngawa
- County seat: Ngawa Town

Area
  - Total: 10,435 km^{2} (4,029 sq mi)

Population (2020)
  - Total: 80,467
  - Density: 7.7113/km^{2} (19.972/sq mi)
- Time zone: UTC+8 (China Standard)
- Website: www.abaxian.gov.cn

Ngawa County

Chinese name
- Simplified Chinese: 阿坝县
- Traditional Chinese: 阿壩縣
Transcriptions
Standard Mandarin
- Hanyu Pinyin: Ābà Xiàn

Tibetan name
- Tibetan: རྔ་བ་རྫོང་།
Transcriptions
- Wylie: rnga ba rdzong
- Tibetan Pinyin: Ngawa Zong

Qiang name
- Qiang: Rrmeabba

Ngawa County (Tibetan: རྔ་བ་རྫོང་།, Wylie: rnga ba rdzong, ZWPY: Ngawa Zong, Chinese: 阿坝县; pinyin: Ābà Xiàn), or Aba or Ngaba, is a county in the northwest of Sichuan Province, China. It is under the administration of the Ngawa Tibetan and Qiang Autonomous Prefecture. It is located in the remote northwestern part of the prefecture, on the border with Qinghai (to the northwest) and Gansu (to the north). The county seat is Ngawa Town.

== Governance ==
The primary law enforcement agency in Ngawa county is the Aba County public security bureau. The People's Armed Police Aba County Company is in charge of paramilitary law enforcement and disaster relief duties. Firefighting and rescue duties are provided by the Aba County Fire and Rescue Battalion.

== Self-immolation incident ==
On 16 March 2011 a 20-year-old Tibetan monk called Phuntsok set fire to himself at a market, in protest against allegedly repressive government policies in Tibet Autonomous Region and other Tibetan populated areas in China. He died in hospital early in the morning of 17 March. Following Phuntsok's self-immolation, hundreds of monks from the same monastery, Kirti monastery in Ngaba County, and other local residents staged another protest.

== Climate ==
Climate data for Ngawa County, elevation 3,275 m (10,745 ft), (1991–2020 normals, extremes 1981–2010)
Month	Jan	Feb	Mar	Apr	May	Jun	Jul	Aug	Sep	Oct	Nov	Dec	Year
Record high °C (°F)	18.1 (64.6)	19.1 (66.4)	22.1 (71.8)	25.7 (78.3)	26.5 (79.7)	27.0 (80.6)	28.0 (82.4)	27.2 (81.0)	27.1 (80.8)	26.4 (79.5)	17.6 (63.7)	17.7 (63.9)	28.0 (82.4)
Mean daily maximum °C (°F)	4.5 (40.1)	7.0 (44.6)	10.0 (50.0)	13.8 (56.8)	16.3 (61.3)	18.2 (64.8)	20.4 (68.7)	20.4 (68.7)	17.8 (64.0)	13.0 (55.4)	8.9 (48.0)	5.2 (41.4)	13.0 (55.3)
Daily mean °C (°F)	−6.3 (20.7)	−3.0 (26.6)	1.2 (34.2)	5.5 (41.9)	8.8 (47.8)	11.7 (53.1)	13.4 (56.1)	12.9 (55.2)	10.3 (50.5)	5.2 (41.4)	−0.8 (30.6)	−5.5 (22.1)	4.5 (40.0)
Mean daily minimum °C (°F)	−14.2 (6.4)	−10.7 (12.7)	−5.4 (22.3)	−1.1 (30.0)	2.9 (37.2)	6.7 (44.1)	8.0 (46.4)	7.3 (45.1)	5.3 (41.5)	0.2 (32.4)	−7.2 (19.0)	−12.7 (9.1)	−1.7 (28.9)
Record low °C (°F)	−29.3 (−20.7)	−28.4 (−19.1)	−18.2 (−0.8)	−9.0 (15.8)	−5.2 (22.6)	−1.3 (29.7)	−0.2 (31.6)	−1.5 (29.3)	−3.5 (25.7)	−12.0 (10.4)	−20.7 (−5.3)	−26.9 (−16.4)	−29.3 (−20.7)
Average precipitation mm (inches)	4.9 (0.19)	9.5 (0.37)	22.9 (0.90)	36.1 (1.42)	96.9 (3.81)	139.8 (5.50)	120.6 (4.75)	108.0 (4.25)	108.2 (4.26)	60.7 (2.39)	8.1 (0.32)	2.9 (0.11)	718.6 (28.27)
Average precipitation days	3.9	6.0	10.1	13.4	20.9	22.6	20.4	18.8	20.0	16.7	4.5	3.0	160.3
Average snowy days	5.9	8.2	13.9	10.6	3.6	0.1	0.1	0.1	0.3	6.4	7.3	4.5	61
Average relative humidity (%)	55	54	58	60	65	72	75	75	75	73	64	58	65
Mean monthly sunshine hours	212.8	190.4	211.8	220.3	211.6	177.5	204.9	203.2	180.4	190.2	216.1	223.8	2,443
Percentage possible sunshine	67	61	57	56	49	42	47	50	49	55	70	72	56
Source: China Meteorological Administration

== Administrative divisions ==
Ngawa County comprises 6 towns and 9 townships:

Name	Simplified Chinese	Hanyu Pinyin	Tibetan	Wylie	Administrative division code
Towns
Ngawa Town (Aba)	阿坝镇	Ābà Zhèn	རྔ་བ་གྲོང་རྡལ།	rnga ba grong rdal	513231100
Jialuo Town (Jialuo)	贾洛镇	Jiǎluò Zhèn	གཅའ་རུ་གྲོང་བརྡལ།	gcav ru grong brdal	513231101
Miuruma town (Meruma, Mai'erma)	麦尔玛镇	Mài'ěrmǎ Zhèn	རྨེའུ་རུ་མ་གྲོང་རྡལ།	rmevu ru ma grong rdal	513231102
Zhocog town (Hocig, Hezhi)	河支镇	Hézhī Zhèn	སྤྲོ་ཚོགས་གྲོང་རྡལ།	spro tshogs grong rdal	513231103
Gomang town (Gemo)	各莫镇	Gèmò Zhèn	སྒོ་མང་གྲོང་རྡལ།	sgo mang grong rdal	513231104
Akam town (Ankyam, Anqiang)	安羌镇	Ānqiāng Zhèn	ཨ་གམས་གྲོང་རྡལ།	a gams grong rdal	513231105
Townships
Mêugor Township (Mêgor, Maikun)	麦昆乡	Màikūn Xiāng	རྨེའུ་སྐོར་ཡུལ་ཚོ།	rmevu skor yul tsho	513231201
Loincang Township (Longzang)	龙藏乡	Lóngzàng Xiāng	བློན་ཚང་ཡུལ་ཚོ།	blon tshang yul tsho	513231203
Qoijêma Township (Qiujima)	求吉玛乡	Qiújímǎ Xiāng	ཆོས་རྗེ་མ་ཡུལ་ཚོ།	chos rje ma yul tsho	513231204
Suwa Township (Siwa)	四洼乡	Sìwā Xiāng	བསུ་བ་ཤང་།	bsu ba shang	513231208
Andü Township (Andou)	安斗乡	Āndǒu Xiāng	ཨ་འདུས་ཡུལ་ཚོ།	a vdus yul tsho	513231209
Kogbo Township (Kehe)	柯河乡	Kēhé Xiāng	ཁོག་པོ་ཡུལ་ཚོ།	khog po yul tsho	513231210
Karsar Township (Karsa, Kuasha)	垮沙乡	Kuǎshā Xiāng	མཁར་སར་ཡུལ་ཚོ།	mkhar sar yul tsho	513231211
Cainxi Township (Chali)	查理乡	Chálǐ Xiāng	མཚན་ཞིད་ཡུལ་ཚོ།	mtshan zhid yul tsho	513231213
Rongwam Township (Rong'an)	茸安乡	Róng'ān Xiāng	རོང་ཝམ་ཡུལ་ཚོ།	rong wam yul tsho	513231214
