= 30th anniversary of the 1989 Tiananmen Square protests and massacre =

2019 commemoration event

30th anniversary of Tiananmen Square protests of 1989
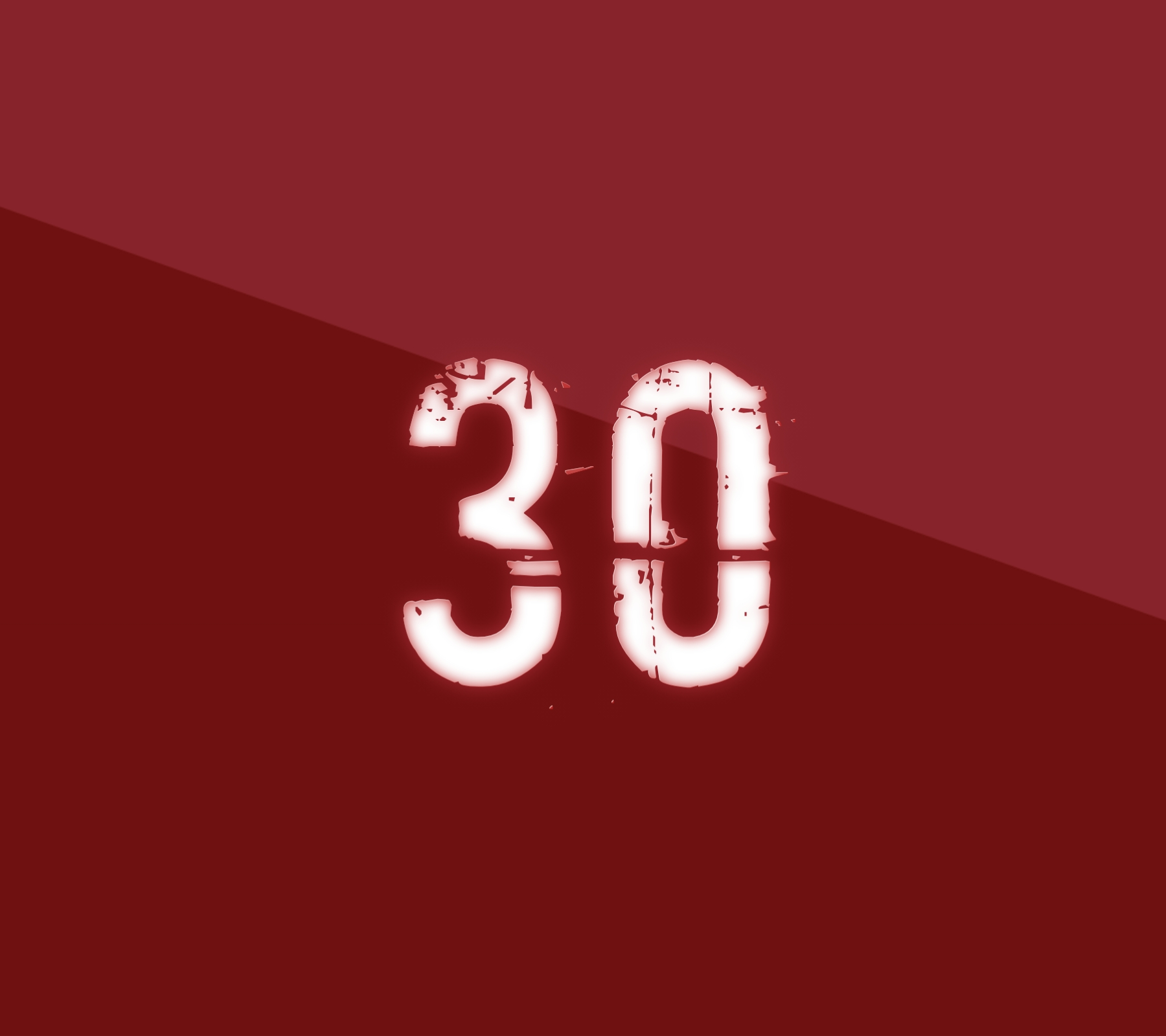
- Date: 4 June 2019
- Location: Hong Kong Taiwan
- Participants: General public
- Outcome: Protest march, Candlelight vigil

The 30th anniversary of Tiananmen Square protests of 1989 was, principally, the events that occurred in China and elsewhere on 4 June 2019 to remember the Chinese Communist Party's crackdown on the Tiananmen Square protests of 1989 in which hundreds of people were killed.

== Tiananmen Square ==
Physical security was tight in Tiananmen Square. There were police patrols around the perimeter of the square, and tourists were forced to wait until ID checks had taken place. Foreign journalists were forbidden from entering the square, and plainclothes security prohibited reporters from taking photographs by using umbrellas to block their shots.

== Censorship ==
=== Official ===
As in previous years, Chinese authorities launched an extensive "stability maintenance" campaign in which activists and others likely to criticise the government are transported to locations outside of Beijing or placed under house arrest; social media is scrubbed of terms and images referring to the protests. Internet users sometimes find that searches even for words such as "today" are routinely blocked.

According to a survey of 60 current and former China-based correspondents conducted by Louisa Lim, a significant proportion has experienced harassment and intimidation – 75% of reporters covering the anniversaries have been intimidated or detained and had complaints lodged against them. Many reporters said they often dropped anniversary reporting because of the difficulty of finding sources, or concern over their vulnerability. Some have had to resort to writing anniversary stories up to six months in advance to avoid official interference into their reporting. Lim said the intimidation has had "an impact on shaping the stories [journalists] tell and the ways that they tell it". There are also concerns over the potential that their visas might not be renewed if they report on sensitive topics.

Due to the severe censorship, most of the younger generation in China, such as Chinese university students, are totally ignorant of the protests in 1989 and the government crackdown on 4 June 1989. Speaker of the United States House of Representatives, Nancy Pelosi, caricatured this by saying that young Chinese thought that 'Tank Man' was the star of a soft drink advertisement.

Chinese internet users reported difficulties in accessing virtual private networks and social media sites. Weibo users were restricted from using many search terms including "Tiananmen", and numbers related to the anniversary, like 4, 6 and 30. WeChat users were blocked from changing usernames and profile photos; Bilibili users found that real-time comments, or "bullet screens" were suspended for "upgrades"; other sites were also affected by "maintenance".

Two censors at Beijing ByteDance Co Ltd, a Chinese internet company that performs online censorship, say China now possesses tools to automatically detect and block content related to the event, and can now identify posts containing sensitive terms with unprecedented levels of accuracy, aided by machine learning and voice and image recognition. Searches of terms related to the Tiananmen crackdown, along with other sensitive issues including Taiwan and Tibet, are now largely automated owing to artificial intelligence.

Wikipedia, whose Chinese-language page of the incident has been blocked permanently since 2015, reported a new block including all pages in every available language. Chinese internet users started complaining about failure to access the site in April; organisations tracking the Great Firewall in China have determined that the entire Wikipedia.org domain has not been accessible from within mainland China since 23 April. Other western media outlets that have suffered ad hoc blocking include The Washington Post, NBC and HuffPost, according to GreatFire.org; The Guardian, which gave the anniversary extensive coverage, saw its website become inaccessible for Chinese users after the anniversary. The British embassy in Beijing, which put out a statement from foreign secretary, Jeremy Hunt, on its Weibo channel to commemorate the anniversary reported that the post had been deleted from domestic social networks. Reuters' news stories about Tiananmen Square on Eikon in China were removed under threat by China's cyberspace administration of suspension if it failed to comply. Some users in Hong Kong also found it impossible to access the stories.

=== Leica advertisement ===
In April, The Hunt, a cinematic advertisement for Leica depicting various photojournalists in moments of armed conflicts was released to great furore in China. In the five-minute promotional video, the story line follows Western journalists who are "hunters", according to the voiceover. One journalist had been harassed by Chinese soldiers inside a Beijing hotel in 1989. In the final scene, he positions himself by the window in his room. As he adjusts his camera, the reflection of a man standing off against a column of tanks – recalling the iconic Tank Man – comes into focus in his camera lens. The advertisement was completely censored on Chinese social media, keyword "Leica" was blocked on Weibo due to "a violation of relevant laws and regulations or the Weibo Community Convention".

Leica attempted to distance itself from the work, saying that it had not been officially sanctioned; the Brazilian advertising agency that produced the film – an office of Saatchi & Saatchi, asserted the next day that it had been "developed together" with its client's representatives in Brazil and that it had had proper approval of its client.

=== Music sites ===
A song sung by Jacky Cheung called "The Path of Man," which describes the 1989 Tiananmen Square crackdown, was removed from Apple Music in China as well as from the Chinese streaming service QQ Music. Coincidentally, Hong Kong singer Anthony Wong, his band Tat Ming Pair and pro-democracy singer Denise Ho were also delisted from the music sites in China.

=== Twitter ===
Twitter suspended a number of accounts critical of China in the run-up to the 30th anniversary of the Tiananmen Square crackdown. According to activists, hundreds of Twitter accounts critical of Communist Party – from "inside and outside" China – were suspended. Accounts that were blocked included those belonging to dissident writers and an activist who has helped document the disappearance of Uighurs in China's restive Xinjiang region. Twitter said that the firm had been caught up in an ongoing effort to clear up accounts "engaging in various forms of platform manipulation, including spam and other inauthentic" behaviour, and that errors may have been made or that such routine actions thrown up false positives. Although Twitter has apologised, activists said they were owed further explanations; US Senator Marco Rubio criticised Twitter saying they have become a proxy for the Chinese censors.

== Detainees ==
In the run-up to the 30th anniversary, the authorities in the People's Republic of China detained and silenced dissidents as in previous years. Targets included Hu Jia, who has been forced to go to Qinhuangdao, a city almost 200 miles from Beijing. Gao Yu, a journalist who attended the protests in 1989, reported that controls on her had been more stringent than in past years. Having been placed under house arrest since 17 January, the 14th anniversary of the death of the reformist leader Zhao Ziyang, who opposed sending tanks into Beijing, she is likely to be taken many miles away from the capital until after 4 June.

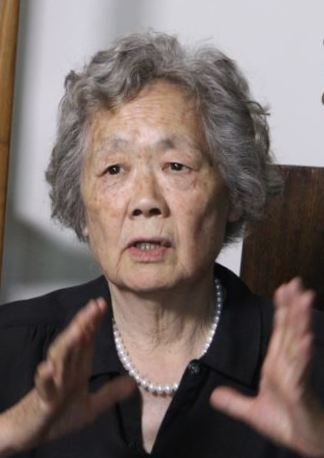
Tiananmen Mother, Ding Zilin, was forced to leave Beijing in late May

Tiananmen Mother Zhang Xianling, whose son was killed during the army suppression, reported the presence of state security officers outside her house on the anniversary of Zhao's death and also paid her a visit on 4 May. Zhang and Gao say there are permanent taps on their telephones. Zhang nevertheless was able to record a video message of thanks to the Hong Kong vigil. She said: "For 30 years, the candle lights at Victoria Park have accompanied us through difficult times, and have warmed our hearts". In late May, Ding Zilin, founder of the group, was taken from her Beijing home by state security and sent to her native Jiangsu province, where she would spend the anniversary out of the potential spotlight.

"Thirty years since the Tiananmen massacre, human rights in China right now is at its worst level and grassroots activism is in its toughest period," said a China researcher at Human Rights Watch.

On 4 April 2019, the fourth of four Sichuan men who were arrested in 2016 for producing a home-made liquor commemorating the 1989 Tiananmen massacre was sentenced to jail for 3 1/2 years. The three other men were also charged with "picking quarrels and provoking trouble", but were instead given suspended sentences. The bottle's label depicted "Tank Man" image from 1989, and boasted of being aged 27 years (for the 27th anniversary in 2016) with 64 percent proof. It was billed as "Eight Liquor June Four" – the word "liquor" (酒) is a homonym of "nine" (九) and sold for 89.64 yuan – all referring to the crackdown date. Although the product was seized, one bottle that survived was smuggled out of the country made a symbolic trip around the world, to the Middle East, France, the US and eventually Hong Kong, where it was put on display in the June 4th Museum.

Chinese rock musician Li Zhi, who had sung ballads about social ills and who had been outspoken about the Tiananmen Square protests, reportedly disappeared from public view three months prior to the anniversary. His upcoming tour was cancelled and his social media accounts were all taken down; all of China's major streaming sites then removed his entire repertoire.

Feng Congde (Chinese: 封從德), dissident and a student leader of the protests, who may have flown in to attend the anniversary candlelight vigil in Victoria Park, has reportedly disappeared after arriving in Hong Kong on a flight from Tokyo. Feng is understood to have been waiting in line for immigration when he was taken away by officials at Chek Lap Kok Airport. The Hong Kong Alliance in Support of Patriotic Democratic Movements in China later said that he was denied entry to Hong Kong by immigration officials, and returned to Tokyo. The Alliance condemned his removal from Hong Kong, alleging that the government had created a 'blacklist of dissidents', whilst the Immigration Department declined to comment on individual cases.

== Taiwan ==
Taiwanese artist Shake installed an inflatable artwork in Taipei, Taiwan. The artwork, which draws inspiration from the iconic photograph "Tank Man" by Jeff Widener that he took from his Beijing hotel room on the fateful day, was installed outside the Chiang Kai-shek Memorial Hall two weeks before the 30th anniversary. On the evening of the anniversary, a memorial was held at Liberty Square. It was attended by President Tsai Ing-wen, former premier William Lai and other Taiwanese officials.

== Hong Kong ==
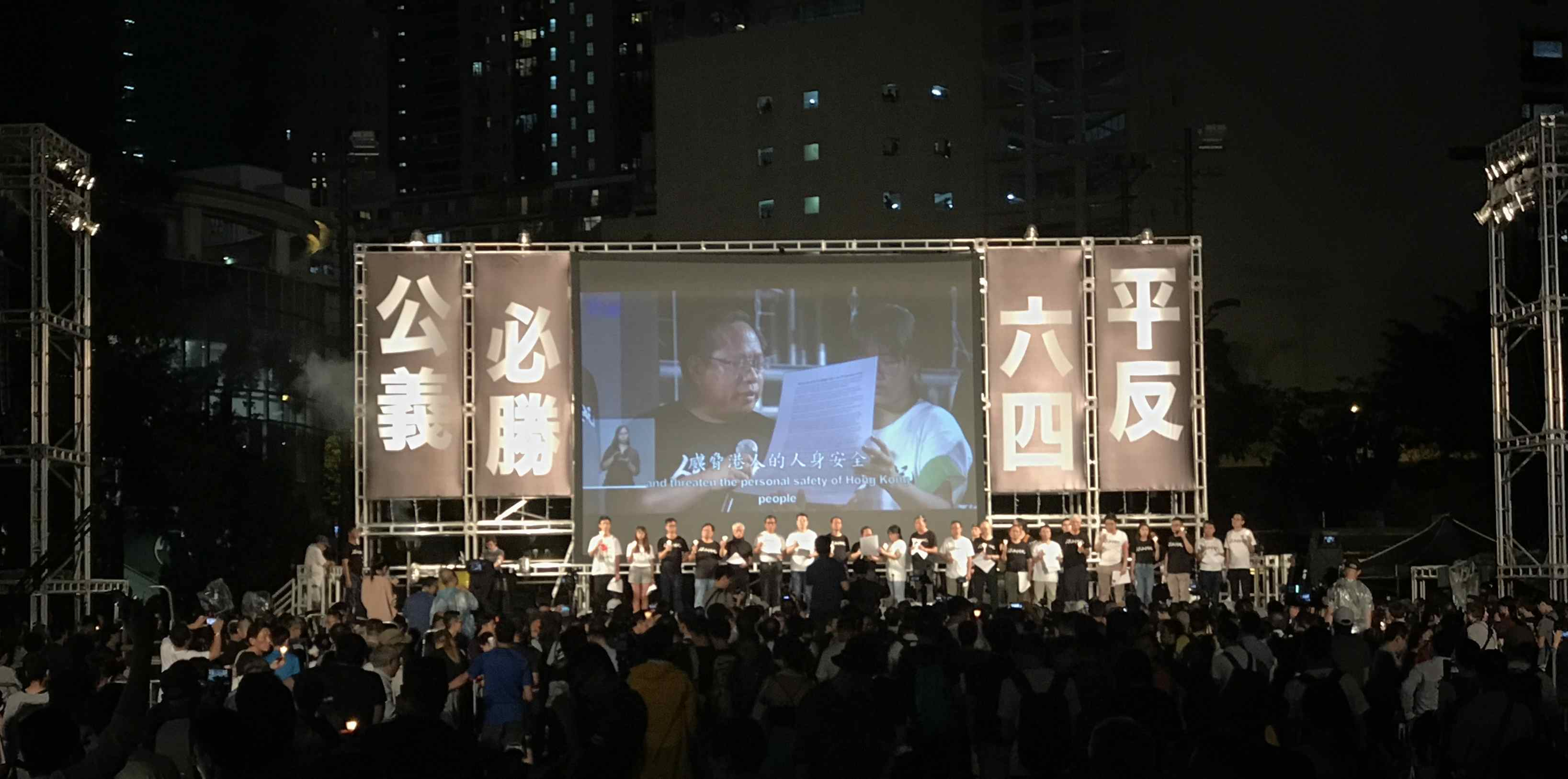
The main stage of 30th anniversary memorial of Tiananmen Square protests in Victoria Park, Hong Kong. The banner says "Redress June Fourth Incident. Justice will prevail."

In April, pro-democracy legislators ritualistically proposed a motion calling for Hong Kong people to remember the 1989 Tiananmen Square crackdown. The motion was defeated in the Legislative Council. It was the 19th time the motion had been tabled and defeated since 1999. Pro-Beijing lawmakers and officials either did not attend the three-hour debate or did not participate in the discussions. The motion was supported by 23 pro-democracy legislators, while 28 legislators voted against it and nine abstained.

To commemorate the anniversary, a group of foreign and local journalists who had covered the 1989 Tiananmen movement in Beijing produced a series of interviews in a collective work entitled: "I am a journalist: My June 4 story". Foreign journalists who were in Beijing in 1989 spoke about the profound impact the experience had on them.

Hong Kong, the only place on Chinese soil where commemorations of the crackdown take place, held a massive vigil. However, some survivors who would otherwise have participated in the event had been denied entry to Hong Kong by Chinese authorities. The organisers said that the turnout figure for the candlelight vigil ceremony at Victoria Park was in excess of 180,000, a record; the HK Police, who have always given much lower figures compared with organisers, estimated that there were 37,000 participants at the peak. The attendance was boosted by the anger of Hongkongers towards the contentious Fugitive Offenders and Mutual Legal Assistance in Criminal Matters Legislation (Amendment) Bill 2019, a piece of legislation that would, once enacted, allow for the legal transfer of criminal suspects to mainland China for prosecution.

== International ==
=== United Kingdom ===
China Labour Solidarity called for a Tiananmen anniversary picketing in front of the Chinese Embassy at 49 Portland Place, London on Saturday 1 June at 1 pm.

=== United States ===
In the US, the National Endowment for Democracy announced its intention to honour human rights activists with its 2019 Democracy Award at a ceremony in the U.S. Capitol on 4 June to mark the 30th anniversary of the massacre of pro-democracy demonstrators in Beijing in 1989. Recipients of the award are the World Uyghur Congress, represented by Dolkun Isa; Tibet Action Institute, represented by Lhadon Tethong; and ChinaAid, represented by Bob Fu. House Republican Conference Chair Elizabeth Cheney, Joaquin Castro, Mike McCaul and Speaker of the House Nancy Pelosi are to address the event.

=== France ===
France held a commemoration in Paris on Place de la République. A 2-D cut-out of a tank was installed by ACAT, a human rights organisation, to serve as a reminder to Parisians of the events thirty years previously. Some members of Paris' Chinese community and others called for transparency and justice in a public commemoration for the victims of the Tiananmen massacre.

=== Germany ===
According to Hong Kong Watch, The Green Party faction in the Bundestag is hosting a seminar entitled "30 years after the Tiananmen massacre: Responding to a changing China" to mark the anniversary. On the panel are the leader of the German Greens Party Katrin Göring-Eckardt, members of parliament Margarete Bause, Agnieszka Brugger and Jürgen Trittin; Hong Kong activists Ray Wong and Alan Li, who were granted political asylum by the German government in 2017, are special invitees.

=== China ===
Presiding over a two-day national public security conference in Beijing in May, Xi Jinping, General Secretary of the Chinese Communist Party, called on the police to demonstrate greater loyalty to the Chinese Communist Party and strengthen their efforts to maintain social stability. He said that officers must "actively prevent and appropriately resolve" conflicts in society. A few days prior to the anniversary, the Chinese Defence Minister Wei Fenghe issued a rare statement that officially acknowledged the events. He defended Beijing's handling of the 1989 protests, saying the government "was decisive in stopping the turbulence".

== See also ==
- Memorials for the 1989 Tiananmen Square protests and massacre
- Internet censorship in China
- Human rights in China
