= Tibetan Freedom Concert =

Series of socio-political music festivals

- Genre: Alternative rock, rap, punk rock
- Dates: April, May, June, July, August, September
- Locations: San Francisco (1996), New York City (1997), Washington D.C. (1998), Amsterdam, (East Troy) Wisconsin, Sydney, Tokyo (1999), Tokyo (2001), Taipei (2003) Vienna and Geneva (2012).
- Years active: 1996–1999; 2001; 2003; 2012

Tibetan Freedom Concert is the name given to a series of socio-political music festivals held in North America, Europe and Asia from 1996 onwards to support the cause of Tibetan independence. The concerts were originally organized by Beastie Boys and the Milarepa Fund.

Organized in 1996, the first concert was held in June in San Francisco and featured acts such as Beastie Boys, Red Hot Chili Peppers, Björk, the Smashing Pumpkins, Cibo Matto, Rage Against the Machine, A Tribe Called Quest, De La Soul, Buddy Guy and John Lee Hooker. It drew 100,000 people and raised over $800,000 for Tibetan and social justice causes. Additional concerts were held until 2003, generating public awareness about the Tibetan independence movement, particularly amongst young people. The concerts helped spur the growth of Students for a Free Tibet worldwide.

== Milarepa Fund ==
The Milarepa Fund was initially created to disburse royalties to Tibetan monks sampled on the Beastie Boys 1994 album Ill Communication. The Milarepa Fund's co-founders were Adam Yauch of the Beastie Boys and social activist Erin Potts, then in her early twenties, whom Yauch had met on a trip to Nepal.

== Tibetan Freedom Concerts ==
=== San Francisco ===
Polo Fields, Golden Gate Park
June 15–16, 1996
$800,000 raised
100,000 attendees

The Smashing Pumpkins, Chaksam-pa, Beastie Boys, A Tribe Called Quest, Pavement, Cibo Matto, Biz Markie, Richie Havens, John Lee Hooker, Red Hot Chili Peppers, Rage Against the Machine, Sonic Youth, Beck, Foo Fighters, Björk, De La Soul, Fugees, Buddy Guy, The Skatalites, and Yoko Ono/Ima.

Speakers: Chimi Thonden – Tibetan Activist, Palden Gyatso – Former Political Prisoner, Shen Tong – Field holding, Chinese Democracy Activist, Robert A.F. Thurman – Professor of Indo-Tibetan Buddhist Studies, Columbia University

Erin Potts and The Milarepa Fund commissioned artist Jim Evans (T.A.Z.) to do a series of limited edition serigraphs for the San Francisco, New York City, and Washington D.C. events.

Free Tibet, a documentary and concert film by Sarah Pirozek, with Erin Potts and Adam Yauch, was released on 11 September 1998.

=== New York City ===
Downing Stadium, Randalls Island
June 7–8, 1997
$250,000 raised
Over 50,000 attendees

Noel Gallagher, Foo Fighters, U2, Sonic Youth, Biz Markie, Alanis Morissette, Patti Smith, The Jon Spencer Blues Explosion, Radiohead, Yungchen Lhamo, Ben Harper & The Innocent Criminals, A Tribe Called Quest, Beastie Boys, Rancid, Björk, Pavement, Blur, Michael Stipe & Mike Mills, Taj Mahal and Phantom Blues Band, De La Soul, Dadon, Chaksam-pa, Nawang Khechog, The Mighty Mighty Bosstones, Eddie Vedder & Mike McCready, KRS-One, Porno for Pyros, and Lee Perry featuring Mad Professor & the Robotiks Band

Speakers: Palden Gyatso – Former Political Prisoner, Dechen Wangdu – Tibetan Activist, Chuck D – Public Enemy, Xiao Qiang – Human Rights in China, Nane Alehandrez – Barrios Unidos

Tibetan Freedom Concert, a compilation album covering events of that concert, was released on November 4, 1997.

=== Washington D.C. ===
RFK Stadium
June 13–14, 1998
$1.2 million raised
Over 120,000 attendees

Beastie Boys, Radiohead, Sean Lennon, Mutabaruka, Money Mark, A Tribe Called Quest, Dave Matthews Band, Sonic Youth, Nawang Khechog, Wyclef Jean, Canibus, Herbie Hancock and the Headhunters, Buffalo Daughter, R.E.M., KRS-One, The Wallflowers, Blues Traveler, Live, Pearl Jam, Luscious Jackson, Red Hot Chili Peppers, Chaksam-pa, Pulp, Bran Van 3000, Patti Smith, The Verve. Many bands, including Kraftwerk and Beck, were cancelled after lightning strikes at the beginning of Herbie Hancock and the Headhunters' set on the first day of music.

Speakers: Xiao Qiang – Human Rights in China, Lhadon Tethong – Students for a Free Tibet, Palden Gyatso – Former Political Prisoner, Wei Jingsheng – Chinese Democracy Activist and Former Political Prisoner

==== Washington D.C. lightning strike ====
As Herbie Hancock took the stage during the Washington, D.C. Concert at about 3:00 PM (June 1998), a storm system formed over the open-air RFK Stadium. While Hancock played, lightning struck fan Lysa Selfon. She was resuscitated on-scene and taken to the trauma unit of a local hospital, and was transferred the next day to Washington Hospital Center. Twelve people were injured; four critically. Selfon suffered the worst injuries and was visited in the hospital by a number of performers. Her burns were worst on her chest, where her underwire bra attracted the electricity and probably caused cardiac arrest.

R.E.M., Radiohead and Red Hot Chili Peppers (originally scheduled for the first day's concert) returned to perform the following day.

=== Free Tibet '99 ===
Amsterdam, East Troy/Wisconsin, Sydney, Tokyo

June 13, 1999
Over 55,000 attendees
$50,000 raised

- Alpine Valley Music Theatre, Wisconsin

Run DMC, The Cult, Beastie Boys, Blondie, Tracy Chapman, The Roots, Live, Eddie Vedder, Otis Rush, Cibo Matto, Handsome Boy Modeling School, Rage Against the Machine, Chaksam-pa

Speakers: Xiao Qiang of Human Rights in China, Lhadon Tethong of Students for a Free Tibet, Nawang Pema- Tibetan Nun

Rai Parkhal, Amsterdam

Garbage, Blur, Urban Dance Squad, Alanis Morissette, Ben Harper & The Innocent Criminals, Luscious Jackson, NRA, Gang Chenpa, Tibetan Institute of Performing Arts, Joe Strummer and The Mescaleros, Thom Yorke & Jonny Greenwood

Speakers: Erin Potts – The Milarepa Fund, Ama Adhe – Former Political Prisoner.

- Tokyo Bay NK Hall, Tokyo

Buffalo Daughter, Audio Active, Kan Takagi, Scha Dara Parr, Kiyoshirou Imawano, Nawang Khechog

Speakers: Alma David – Students for a Free Tibet, Jurme Wangda – Liaison Office of His Holiness the Dalai Lama

- Sydney Show Grounds, Sydney

Regurgitator, Spiderbait, The Mavis's, The Avalanches, Neil Finn, The Living End, Celibate Rifles, Not From There, Gerling, Jebediah, You Am I, Garpa, Blackalicious, Eskimo Joe, Trans Am

Speakers: Lobsang Lungtok – Former Political Prisoner, Jo Shaw – Students for a Free Tibet, Australia, Dorji Dolma – Australia Tibet Council

=== Tokyo ===
May 13, 2001
Tokyo Bay NK Hall
Over 6,000 attendees

Thee Michelle Gun Elephant, UA, Chaksam-pa, Boom Boom Satellites, Buffalo Daughter

Speakers: Palden Gyatso – Former Political Prisoner, Zatul Rinpoche – Liaison Office of His Holiness the Dalai Lama, Adam Yauch – Beastie Boys, Tomoko Tahara – The Milarepa Fund

=== Taipei ===
April 20, 2003
Stadium of Songshan Tobacco Factory
Over 8,000 attendees

Beastie Boys, LMF, Tizzy Bac, Nawang Khechog, Bobby Chen

Speakers: Tsegyam Ngaba – Taipei Office of His Holiness the Dalai Lama, Adam Yauch – Beastie Boys, Hsiao Bi-khim – Taiwan Tibet Exchange Foundation, Freddy Lim – Chthonic

== Freedom Needs A Soundtrack Documentary Podcast ==
In June of 2026, at the 30th anniversary of the first Tibetan Freedom Concerts, a six-part narrative series was released that revisits the genesis, impact, and legacy of the Tibetan Freedom Concert. Produced by Adonde Media and distributed in partnership with KALW Public Radio, the podcast blends archival recordings with new interviews featuring artists, organizers, activists, and Tibetan voices who helped shape the movement.

Through new interviews and archival tape, the series includes voices such as Adam Yauch, Biz Markie, Björk, Bono, Dave Grohl, Deyden Tethong, Erin Potts, Flea, Kurt Loder, Lhadon Tethong, Ngawang Sangdrol, Palden Gyatso, Sam Chapin, Thom Yorke, Tom Morello, Yoko Ono, and others.

== See also ==
- International Tibet Independence Movement
- Milarepa
- Dalai Lama
- Tibetan Freedom Concert (album)
