= Tethong =

Tethong is a surname. Notable people with the surname include:

- Tsewang Choegyal Tethong (1934–2024), Tibetan academic and politician
- Tenzin Geyche Tethong (born 1944), Tibetan politician and former secretary to the 14th Dalai Lama
- Tenzin Tethong (born 1947), Tibetan political figure and former Prime Minister (Kalon Tripa) of Central Tibetan Administration
- Kelsang Chukie Tethong (born 1956), Tibetan singer
- Wangpo Tethong (born 1963), Swiss-Tibetan writer, activist and politician
- Lhadon Tethong (born 1976), Tibetan-Canadian political activist
