= Tibetan Freedom Concert (album) =

Live album by Various Artists
- Released: November 4, 1997
- Recorded: June 8 and 9 1997
- Venue: Downing Stadium, Randalls Island
- Genre: Various
- Label: Capitol
- Producer: Pat McCarthy, Sylvia Massy

Professional ratings
Review scores
Source	Rating
Allmusic	link

Tibetan Freedom Concert is a live album by various artists, recorded at the 1997 Tibetan freedom concert held in New York City to support Tibetan independence. It was recorded and produced by Pat McCarthy and Sylvia Massy, and mixed in New York City at Greene Street Studios.

== Track listing ==
=== Disc 1 ===
1. Opening prayers – Tibetan monks
2. "Ground On Down" – Ben Harper
3. "Blues Explosion Man" – The Jon Spencer Blues Explosion
4. "Om Mani Padme Hung" – Yungchen Lhamo
5. "About a Boy" – Patti Smith
6. "Fake Plastic Trees" – Radiohead
7. "Oh My God" – A Tribe Called Quest
8. "One" – U2
9. "Cast No Shadow" – Noel Gallagher
10. "Wildflower" – Sonic Youth
11. "Meija" – Porno for Pyros
12. "The Celebration" – Nawang Khechog
13. "This Is a Call" – Foo Fighters
14. "The Bridge Is Over/Black Cop/South Bronx Medley" – KRS-One
15. "Star Spangled Banner/Nobody Beats the Biz" – Biz Markie
16. Closing prayers – Tibetan monks

=== Disc 2 ===
1. Opening prayers – Tibetan monks
2. "Yellow Ledbetter" – Eddie Vedder & Mike McCready
3. "Noise Brigade" – The Mighty Mighty Bosstones
4. "Type Slowly" – Pavement
5. "Gyi Ma Gyi" – Dadon
6. "Heads of Government" – Lee "Scratch" Perry
7. "She Caught the Katy" – Taj Mahal & The Phantom Blues Band
8. "Beetlebum" – Blur
9. "Electrolite" – Mike Mills and Michael Stipe
10. "Ajo Sotop" – Chaksam-pa
11. "Wake Up" – Alanis Morissette
12. "Hyper-Ballad" – Björk
13. "The Harder They Come" – Rancid
14. "Root Down" – Beastie Boys
15. "Closing prayers" – Tibetan monks

=== Disc 3 ===
1. "Birthday Cake" – Cibo Matto
2. "Asshole" – Beck
3. "Me, Myself & I" – De La Soul
4. "Fu-Gee-La" – The Fugees
5. "Bulls on Parade" – Rage Against the Machine
