= Tibet Action Institute =

Tibetan movement organization

- Formation: 2009
- Director: Lhadon Tethong
- Website: tibetaction.net

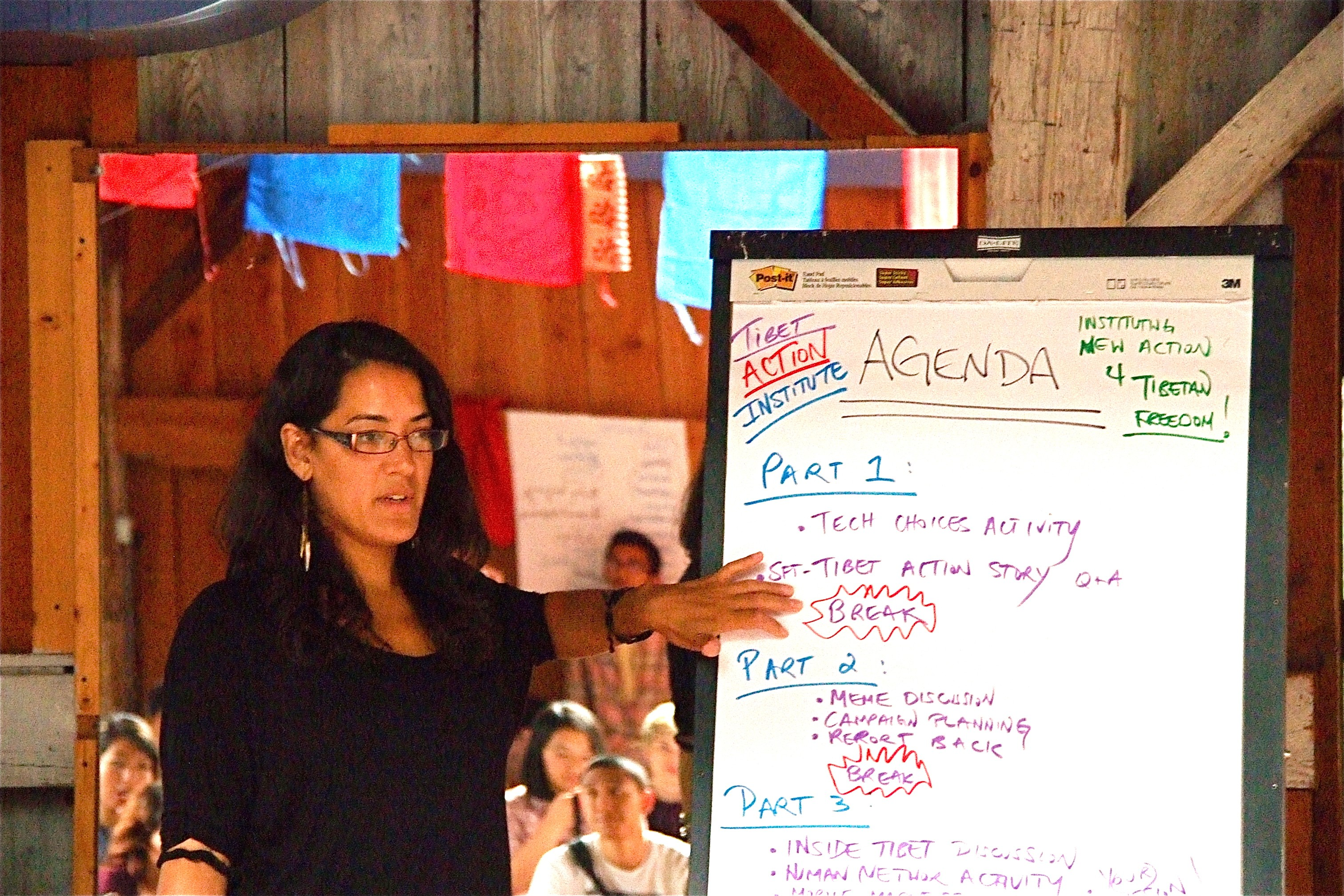
Lhadon Tethong leads a workshop for the Tibet Action Institute on 22 April 2010

The Tibet Action Institute is an organization that uses digital communication tools and strategic nonviolent action to strengthen the capacity and effectiveness of the Tibet movement in the digital era, co-founded by Lhadon Tethong and Nathan Fretias (also founder and director of Guardian Project) in 2009. The organization helps to identify, trace, and resist malware and other online attacks launched against Tibetan activists.

== Activities ==
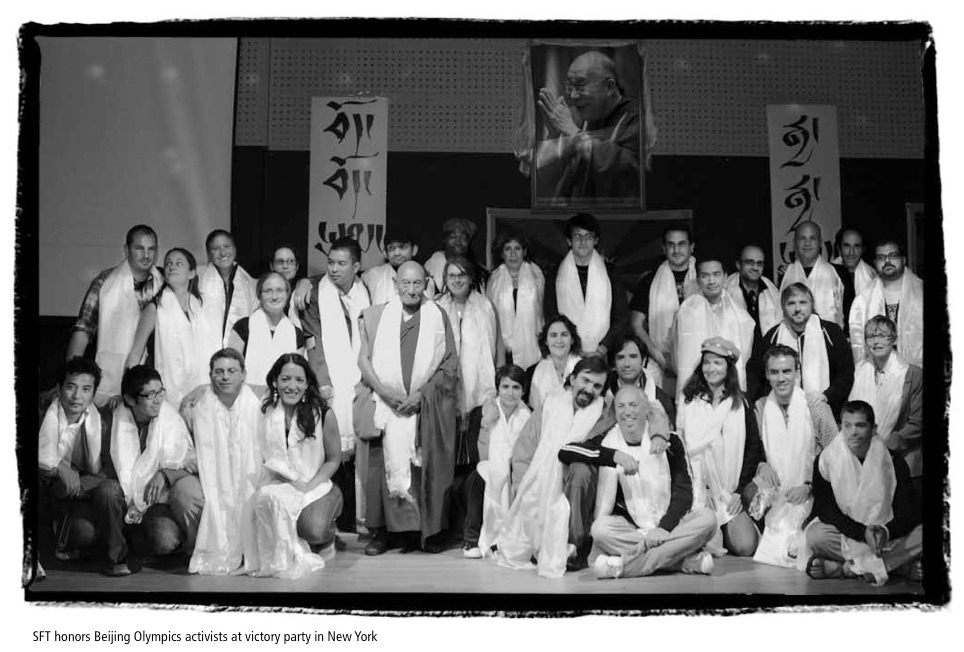
Students for a Free Tibet Honors Beijing Olympics Activists at Victory Party in New York City on 19 February 2009 with special guest Palden Gyatso in robes, standing in center

In 2012, Lhadon Tethong, director of the Tibet Action Institute, explained self-immolations in Tibet as a response to escalating repression from the Chinese government.

In 2013, Citizen Lab collaborated with the Tibet Action Institute to hold public awareness events in Dharamshala, India, for the exiled Tibetan community on cyber espionage campaigns.

In 2018, Lhadon Tethong said there was a "crisis of repression unfolding across China and territories it controls." and that "it is shocking to know that Google is planning to return to China and has been building a tool that will help the Chinese authorities engage in censorship and surveillance." She further noted that, "Google should be using its incredible wealth, talent, and resources to work with us to find solutions to lift people up and help ease their suffering — not assisting the Chinese government to keep people in chains."

The organization published a report titled "Separated from their families, hidden from the world" in 2021. This report documents China's vast system of colonial boarding schools inside of Tibet.

The report reveals that roughly 800,000 Tibetan children from age six to 18 – 78% of Tibetan students – are living in Chinese colonial boarding schools, separated physically from their families, communities, and culture. Children leave their families to live on-site at these schools, their classes are taught primarily in Chinese, and the curriculum presented is "highly politicized" that is "intended to make [the students] identify as Chinese, instead of Tibetan.

== Recognition ==
In 2019, the group received the Democracy Award from the National Endowment for Democracy. In 2024, it was again nominated for this award.

For her work exposing China's network of colonial boarding schools in Tibet, Tethong received the International Campaign for Tibet's Snow Lion Human Rights Prize in 2024.
