= Zorba Paster =

American physician

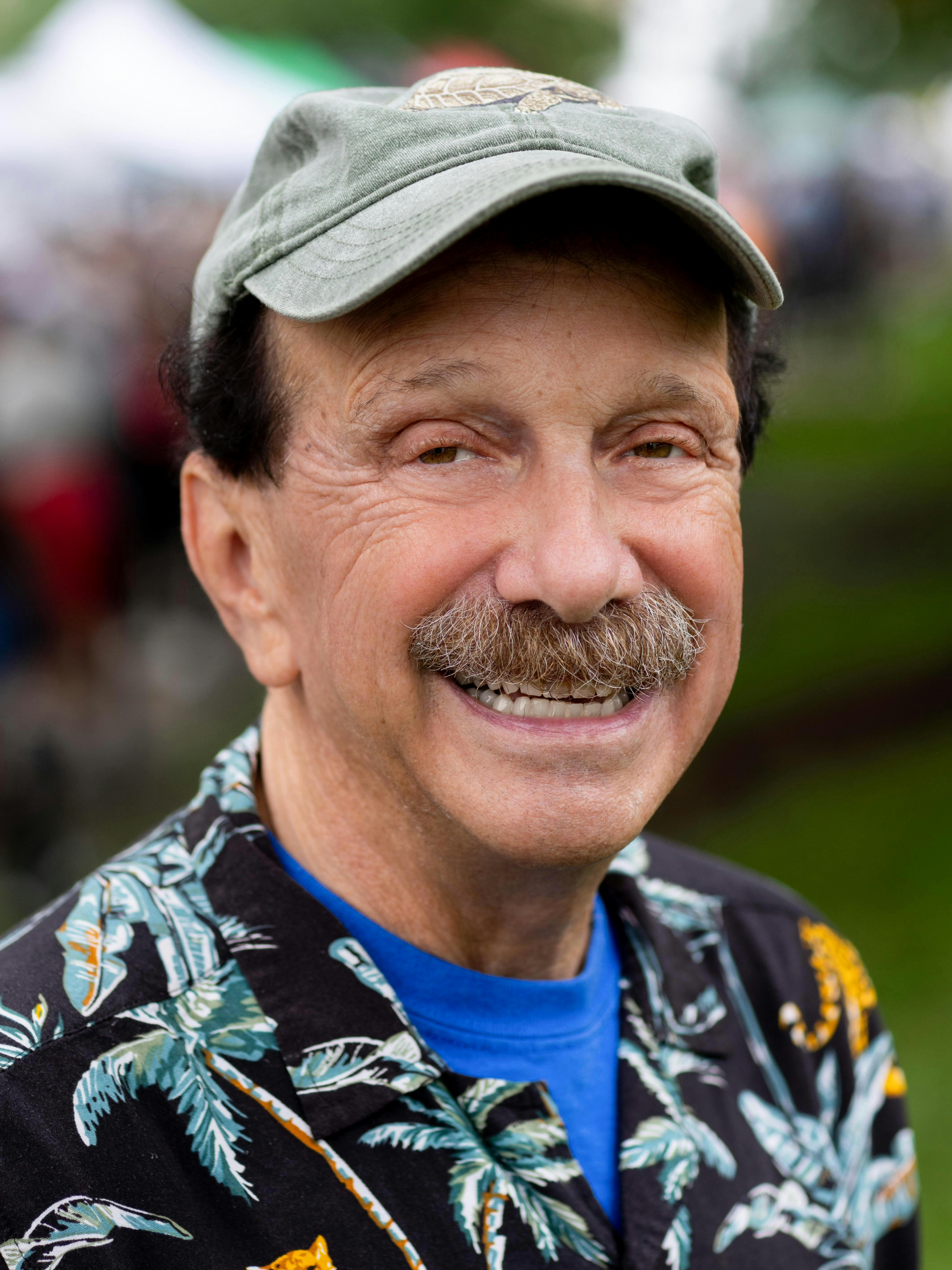
Dr. Zorba Paster at the farmer's market in Madison, Wisconsin (2025)

Robert Zorba Paster is an American physician and radio show host.

Paster was born on August 19, 1947, and raised in Chicago. He hosted a weekly radio call-in show on personal health issues called Zorba Paster on Your Health. The show was produced by Wisconsin Public Radio, syndicated by the Public Radio Exchange, and was broadcast on public radio stations around the United States.

Dr. Paster currently hosts Stay Well with Dr. Zorba Paster, a health and wellness podcast co-hosted and produced by Karl Christenson.

In addition to his weekly show for Wisconsin Public Radio, Paster provides weekly medical commentaries on WISC-TV in Madison and writes a column for the Wisconsin State Journal and other newspapers across the country. He is the editor of TopHealth, a monthly wellness letter. Paster has written The Longevity Code: Your Prescription for a Longer, Sweeter Life with Susan Meltsner, published by Random House. He writes of "the Long Sweet Life", and states that achieving longevity is much more complex than merely maintaining healthy diet and exercise.

Paster and his wife have been involved in the Tibetan independence movement since 1968, having studied under Geshe Sopa, one of America's premier teachers of Tibetan Buddhism In June 2008, together with Dr. Richard Chaisson and Kunchok Dorjee, he participated in improving a program at the Tibetan Delek Hospital supported by Johns Hopkins University, aiming to control tuberculosis within the Tibetan diaspora. Paster is the chairman of Friends of Tibetan Delek Hospital, an organization aiming to help Delek Hospital. Paster is also involved in providing medical care for the Dalai Lama along with Tsetan Sandutshang, the Dalai Lama's primary physician.

Paster received his pre-med degree from the University of Wisconsin - Madison and his MD from the University of Illinois, Chicago. He did his internship and residency at Dalhousie University School of Medicine, Halifax, Nova Scotia.

He is a family physician at the Dean Medical Center near Madison, Wisconsin. Additionally, he is an adjunct professor of family medicine at the University of Wisconsin School of Medicine and Public Health where he teaches medical residents and medical students. He and his family live in Oregon, Wisconsin.

== Publications ==
- Heart-Healthy, Low-Fat, Guilt-Free and Tasty Recipes from the Kitchen of Zorba Paster. Wisconsin Public Radio Association, 2000.
- The Longevity Code: Your Prescription for a Longer, Sweeter Life written with Susan Melstner. New York: Random House, 2001.
