= Pema Doma =

Tibetan activist

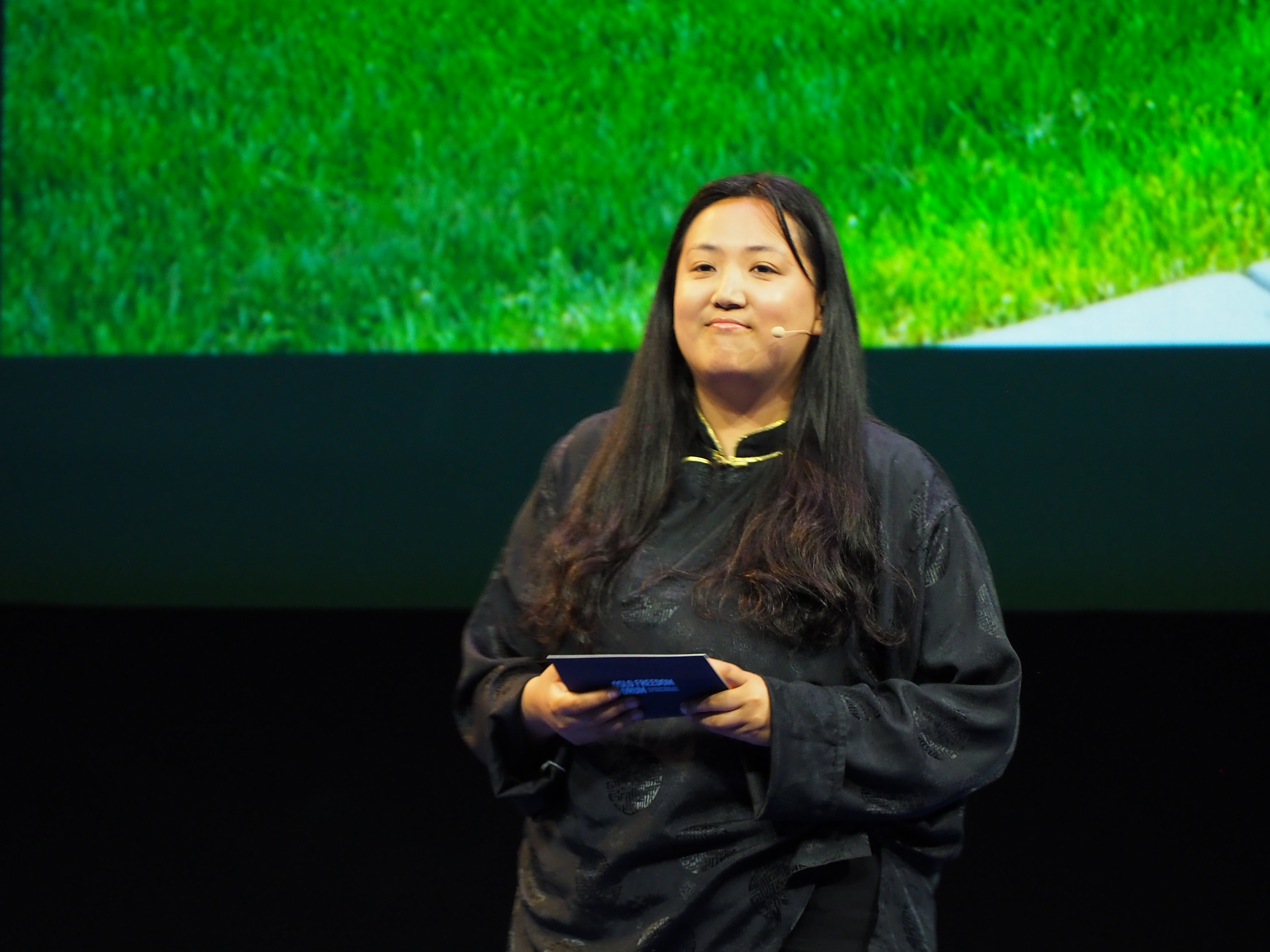
- Occupation: Human rights activist

Pema Doma is a Tibetan-born human rights and climate activist, and currently serves as executive director of Students for a Free Tibet (SFT). Her career in activism began in 2010 as a youth community organizer in Boston. In 2016, Doma joined the Tibetan Freedom Movement in New York. After an internship program, she founded an undergraduate chapter at her university and served as the president. Doma would go on to head the SFT organization, and promote freedom in Tibet, while also highlighting human rights abuses perpetrated by the Chinese government.
