= Fire Under the Snow =

2008 documentary film

Fire Under the Snow is a 2008 documentary film on the life of Tibetan monk Palden Gyatso, recounting 33 years of his life spent as a political prisoner in Chinese prisons and labor camps. The documentary is directed by Japanese filmmaker Makoto Sasa and based on the book by Palden Gyatso in Tibetan language.
