= Tsewang Choegyal Tethong =

Tibetan professor and politician (1933–2024)

Minister of Foreign Affairs of the Central Tibetan Administration
- In office April 1997 – August 2001
- Preceded by: Tashi Wangdi
- Succeeded by: Lobsang Tenzin

Personal details
- Born: 1934 Chamdo, Tibet
- Died: 12 March 2024 (aged 89–90) Canada
- Occupation: Academic

Tsewang Choegyal Tethong (1934 – 12 March 2024) was a Tibetan academic and politician. He was a representative of the Offices of Tibet in New Delhi and a minister within the Central Tibetan Administration.

== Biography ==
Born in Chamdo in 1934, Tethong was the son of Gyurme Gyatso Tethong and Dolma Tsering (née Rong Dekyiling). He went into exile in 1949, shortly before the Battle of Chamdo. In 1959, he became a volunteer at refugee camps for Tibetans who fled after the 1959 Tibetan uprising, attracting the attention of the 14th Dalai Lama, for whom he became personal interpreter. In 1968, he became leader of the Mundgod refugee camp, where he met his wife, Judy.

In the 1970s, Tethong was invited to teach at Pearson College UWC in Canada. On 17 December 1996, he became the new representative of the Bureau of the Dalai Lama in New Delhi. He was Minister of Foreign Affairs of the Central Tibetan Administration from April 1997 to August 2001. He then retired and was named an honorary professor of the University of British Columbia. His daughter, Lhadon Tethong, founded Students for a Free Tibet.

Tsewang Choegyal Tethong died on 12 March 2024 in Canada.
