= Palden Gyatso =

Tibetan monk (1933–2018)

- དཔལ་ལྡན་རྒྱ་མཚོ
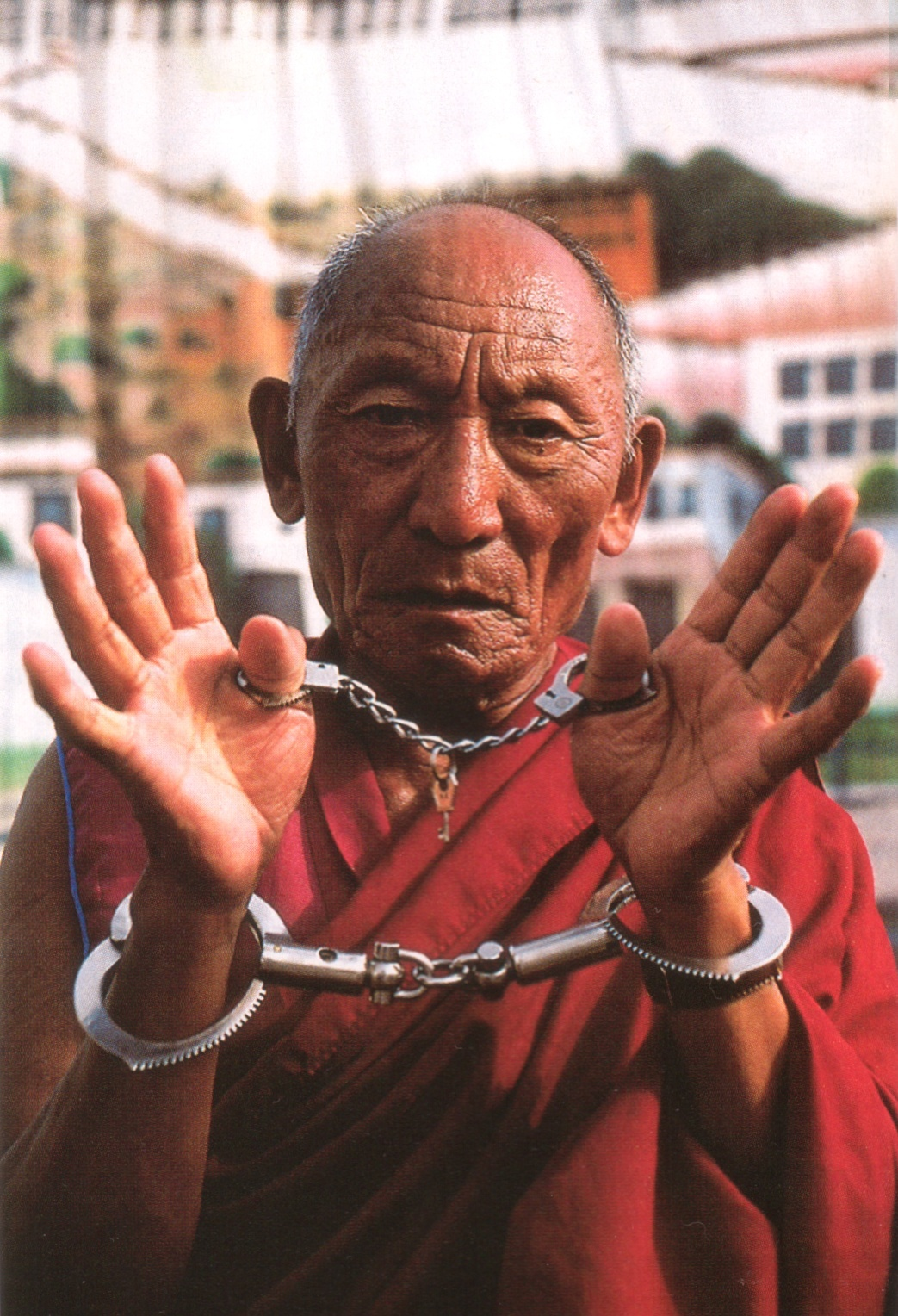
- Palden Gyatso, July 2000, France
- Pronunciation: dpal ldan rgya mtsho
- Born: 1933; Panam, Tibet
- Died: 30 November 2018 (aged 84–85); Dharamshala, India

Palden Gyatso (1933, Panam, Tibet – 30 November 2018, Dharamshala, India, Standard Tibetan: དཔལ་ལྡན་རྒྱ་མཚོ་, romanized: dpal ldan rgya mtsho) was a Tibetan Buddhist monk. Arrested for protesting during the Chinese invasion of Tibet, he spent 33 years in Chinese prisons and labor camps, where he was extensively tortured, and served the longest term of any Tibetan political prisoner. After his release in 1992 he fled to Dharamsala in North India, in exile. He was still a practicing monk and became a political activist, traveling the world publicizing the cause of Tibet up until his death in 2018. His autobiography Fire Under the Snow is also known as The Autobiography of a Tibetan Monk. He was the subject of the 2008 documentary film Fire Under the Snow.

== Life ==
Palden Gyatso was born in 1933 in the Tibetan village of Panam, located on the Nyangchu River between Gyantse and Shigatse. A few days after his birth a search party of high lamas arrived from Drag Riwoche Monastery and declared him one of the candidates for the reincarnation of a high lama who had died the year before. In 1943, he entered Gadong Monastery as a novice monk. During the Chinese invasion, he became a fully ordained monk of the Gelug school. At the invitation of the 14th Dalai Lama, he moved to Drepung Monastery near Lhasa to complete his studies.

Palden Gyatso was arrested in June 1959 by Chinese officials for demonstrating during the 10 March 1959 Tibetan uprising. He spent the following 33 years in different Chinese prisons and laogai or "reform through labor" camps, the longest term of any Tibetan political prisoner. "He was forced to participate in barbarous re-education classes and He was tortured by various methods, which included being beaten with a club ridden with nails, shocked by an electric probe, which scarred his tongue and caused his teeth to fall out, whipped while being forced to pull an iron plow, and starved." leading to irreversible physical damage. During this time, he continued to abide by the Dharma, the Buddha's teachings. Released in 1992, he escaped to Dharamsala in India, home of the Tibetan government in exile.

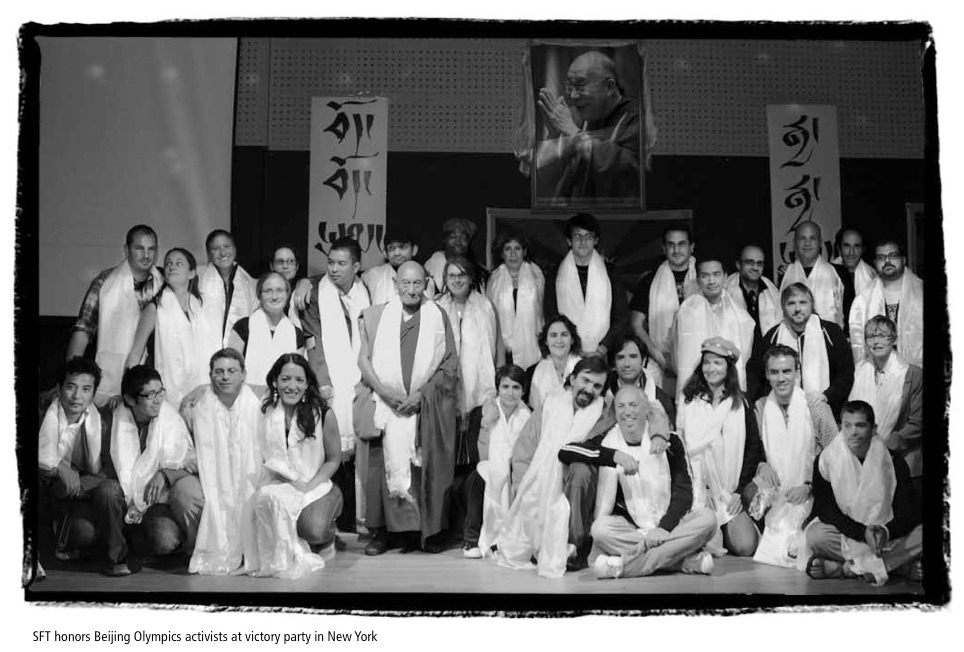
Students for a Free Tibet honors Beijing Olympics activists at victory party, New York in 2008 (Palden Gyatso in robes, standing in center)

In Dharamsala, he wrote his autobiography, Fire Under The Snow in Tibetan, since translated into many other languages, which inspired the 2008 film, also named Fire Under The Snow. The Autobiography of a Tibetan Monk was published in 1998. The Dalai Lama noted in the foreword that "His sense of the justice of our cause and his indignation at what has been done to so many Tibetans are so urgent that he has not rested. Having for years resisted Communist Chinese efforts to conceal and distort it, he has seized the opportunity to tell the world the truth about Tibet.”

During his visits to America and Europe, he became politically active as an opponent of the Chinese occupation in Tibet and as a witness of many years under Chinese confinement. In 1995, he was the first Tibetan political prisoner to address the United Nations Human Rights Council and also addressed the U.S. House of Representatives Committee on Human Rights. In 1998, he won the John Humphrey Freedom Award from the Canadian human rights group Rights & Democracy. In honor of the 2006 International Day in Support of Victims of Torture, the U.S. Senate honored him with a tribute. Annie Lenox interviewed him in 2007. The film was widely distributed by Amnesty International. In 2009, he spoke at the inaugural Oslo Freedom Forum.

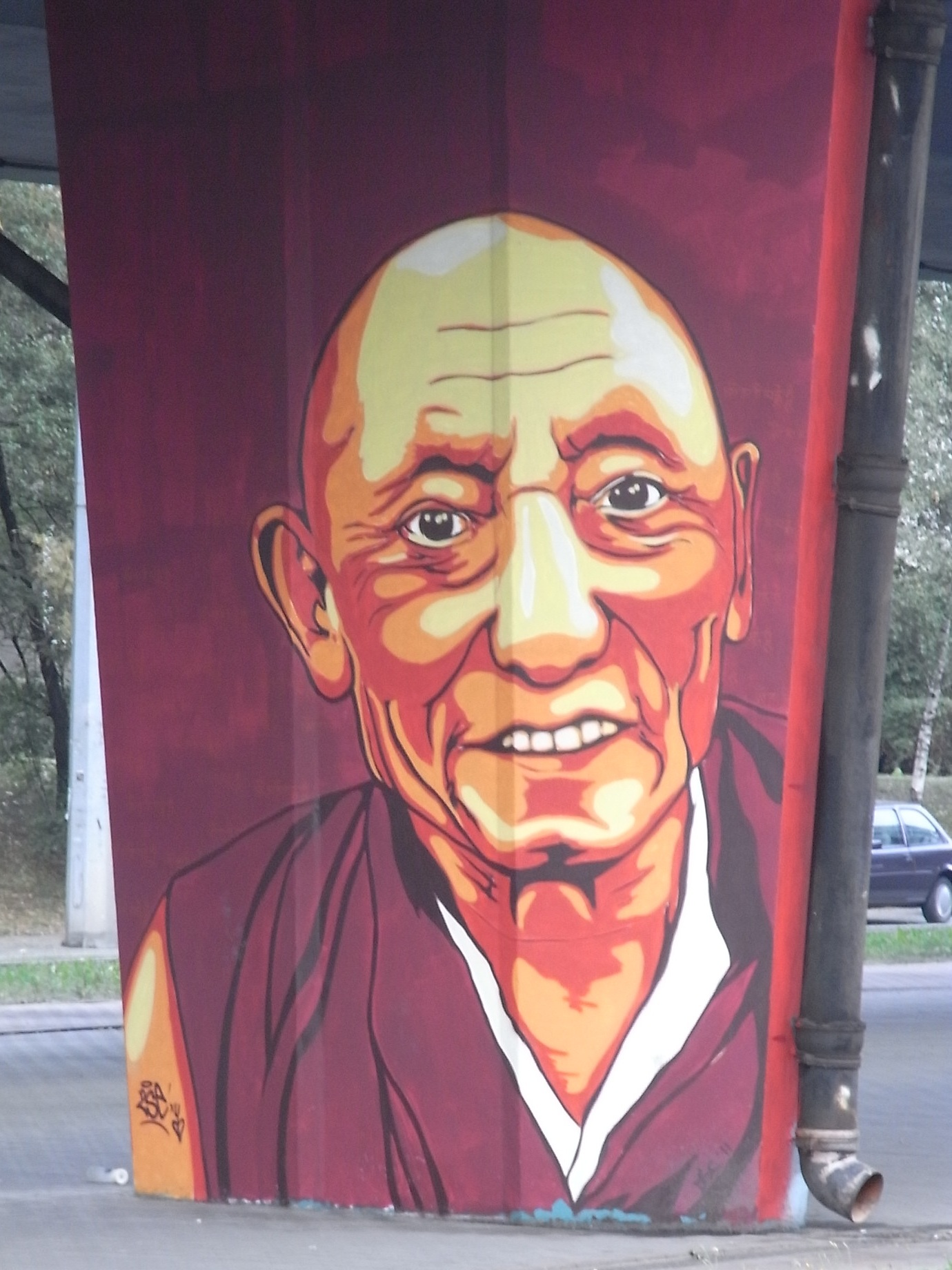
2012 painting of Palden Gyatso in Warsaw, Poland

Palden Gyatso lived in Dharamsala, pursuing his Buddhist studies. He died on 30 November 2018 at Delek Hospital, Dharamshala, India.

== See also ==
- Political prisoner
- Prisoner of conscience
- Laogai or Chinese Labor Camps
- Labor camp
- Human Rights in China

== Literature ==
- Fire Under The Snow, Palden Gyatso, The Harvill Press, 1997, London (ISBN 1 86046 509 9)
- The Autobiography of a Tibetan Monk, Grove Press, 1997 (ISBN 978-0-8021-3574-2)

== Films ==
- Tibetan Monk Palden Gyatso in Conversation with Annie Lennox, 1998
- Fire Under the Snow, documentary, 2008
