= Lhadon Tethong =

Tibetan-Canadian political activist

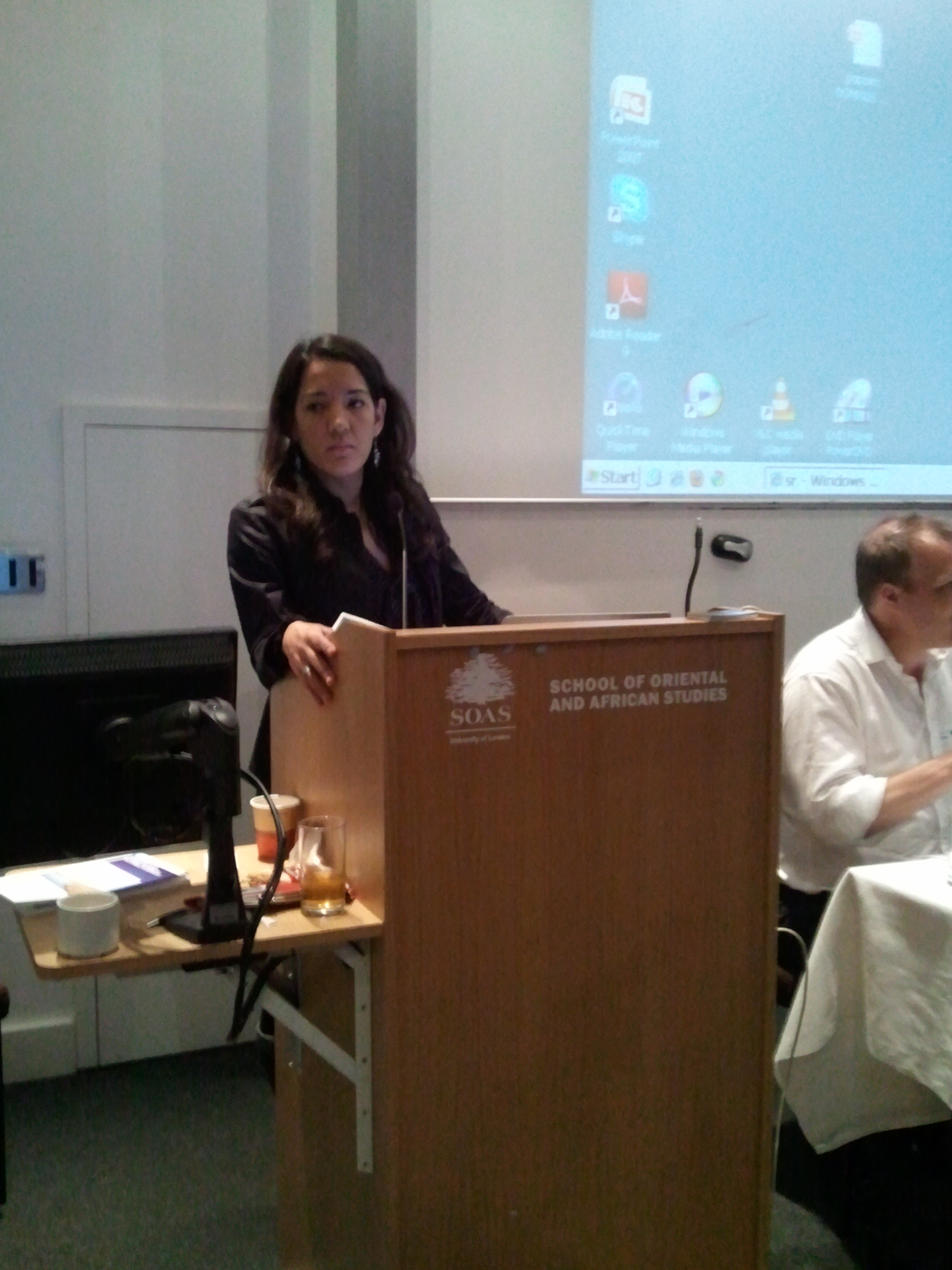
- Lhadon Tethong in 2011, speaking at a SFTUK Environment conference
- Born: 1976 (age 49–50); Victoria, British Columbia, Canada
- Education: University of King's College

Lhadon Tethong (born 1976) is a Tibetan-Canadian political activist, co-founder and director of Tibet Action Institute, and former executive director of Students for a Free Tibet.

== Biography ==
Tethong was born in 1976 in Victoria, British Columbia, Canada, to Judy Tethong, a Canadian aid worker, and Tsewang Choegyal Tethong, who ran a refugee camp in southern India and worked for the Central Tibetan Administration. She is a graduate of the University of King's College, where she founded the first chapter of Students for a Free Tibet after being encouraged by the size of the crowd at the first Tibetan Freedom Concert.

== Activism ==
Tethong first became a public spokesperson on Tibetan independence when she gave a speech at the 1998 Tibetan Freedom Concert. She started working for Students for a Free Tibet in 1999, moving to New York to do so, and became an executive director four years later in 2003.

Tethong was detained in China in 2007 after protesting against Chinese rule of Tibet while in Beijing. She had kept a blog, posting writing, videos, and photos detailing the country's preparation for the 2008 Olympics, and garnered the attention of security officials, who arrested her after intense monitoring. She was released and deported to Canada less than two days after her detainment.

Tethong founded Tibet Action Institute in 2009, aiming to strengthen the Tibetan independence movement through the use of digital communication to bolster strategic nonviolent activism. In 2011, she was awarded the first annual James Lawson Award for Nonviolent Achievement by the International Center on Nonviolent Conflict.
