= Tibetan Delek Hospital =

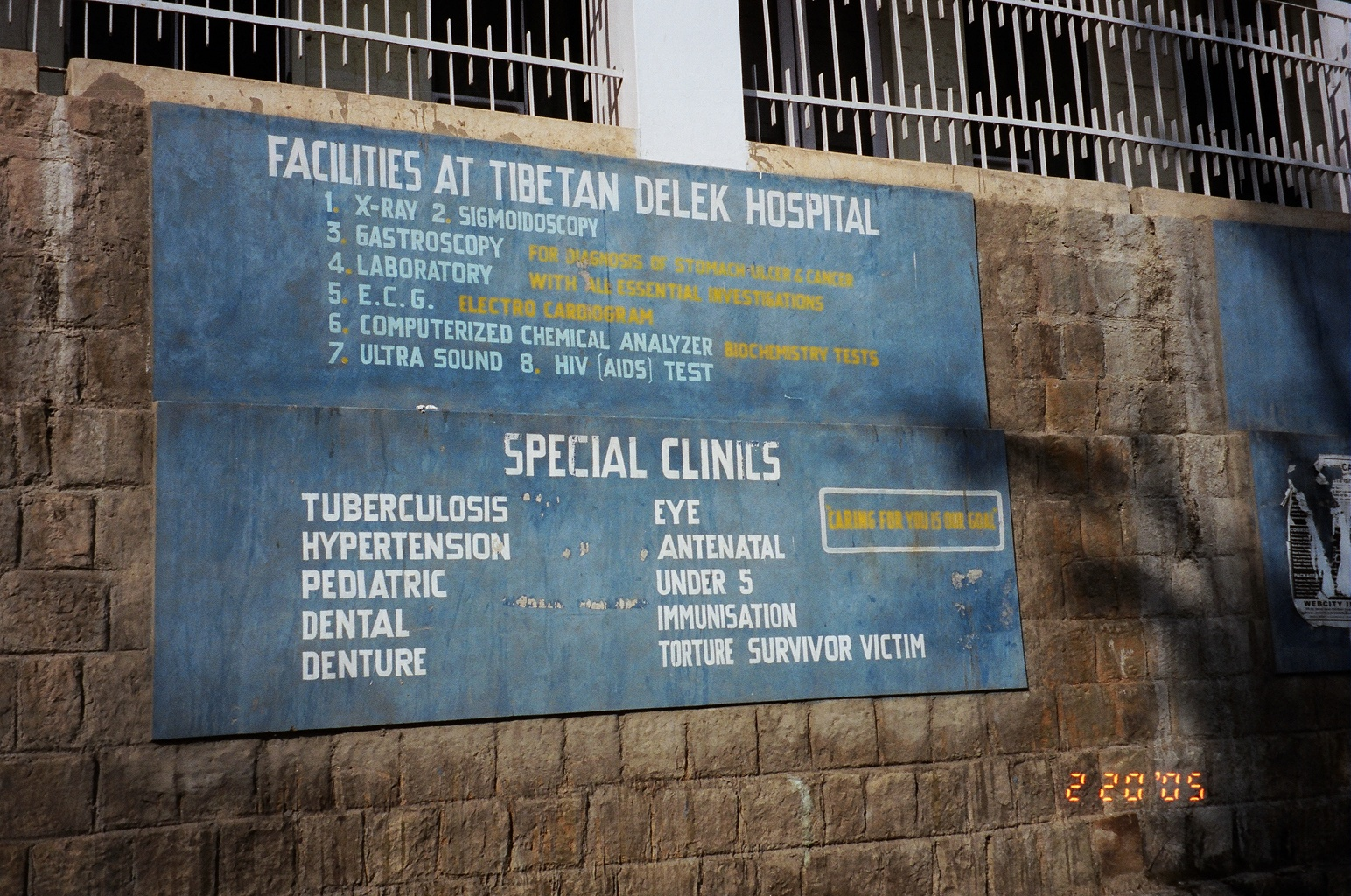

Geography
- Location: Gangchen Kyishong; 176215 Dharamshala, Himachal Pradesh, India
- Coordinates: 32.222°N 76.3172°E

Services
- Beds: 45

History
- Founded: 1971

The Tibetan Delek Hospital is a hospital founded in 1971 by members of the Tibetan diaspora and their supporters and located in Dharamshala in Northern India. It serves the Tibetan residents and local community in the region, as well as tourists from around the world. It practices social assistance, mainly using modern medicine. In 2013, the Stop TB Partnership's selection committee chose the Delek hospital as the winner of that year's Kochon Prize, a prestigious award that recognizes persons and institutions who have made major contributions to the fight against tuberculosis. However, the winner must be approved by the director-general World Health Organization (WHO) Margaret Chan at the time), and the WHO nullified the choice, because the hospital has ties to the Central Tibetan Administration, which considers itself the Tibetan government-in-exile, and "The WHO is not able to recognize any entity that is not in turn recognized as a legal authority by the UN," according to a spokesman for the WHO and a statement published in the medical journal The Lancet. However, China had also objected to the selection, and the Tibetan exile community believed that their pressure was responsible for the override.

== History ==
Delek Hospital was built through donations and provides care at a low cost to patients, while taking care of low-income patients. It was founded in 1971 by the Fourteenth Dalai Lama to give modern medicine to Tibetan refugees and the Indian community living in Dharamsala, a city of Northern India.

Friends of Tibetan Delek Hospital Backup Generator installed August 2007 with Dr Zorba Pastor on the right

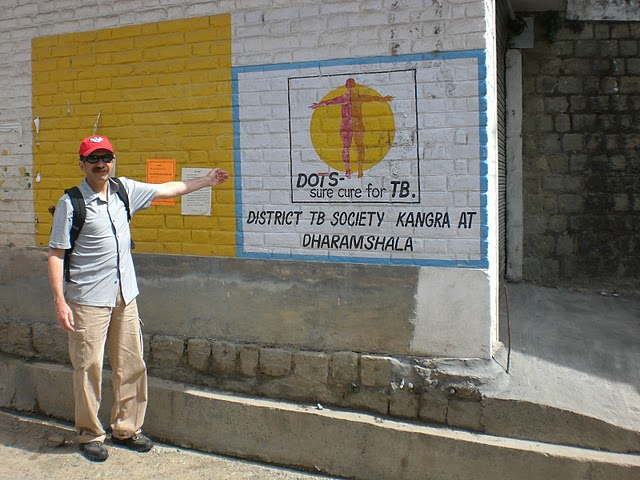
Sign for Directly Observed Treatment (DOTS) for TB in Dharamsala, India, on 25 May 2008

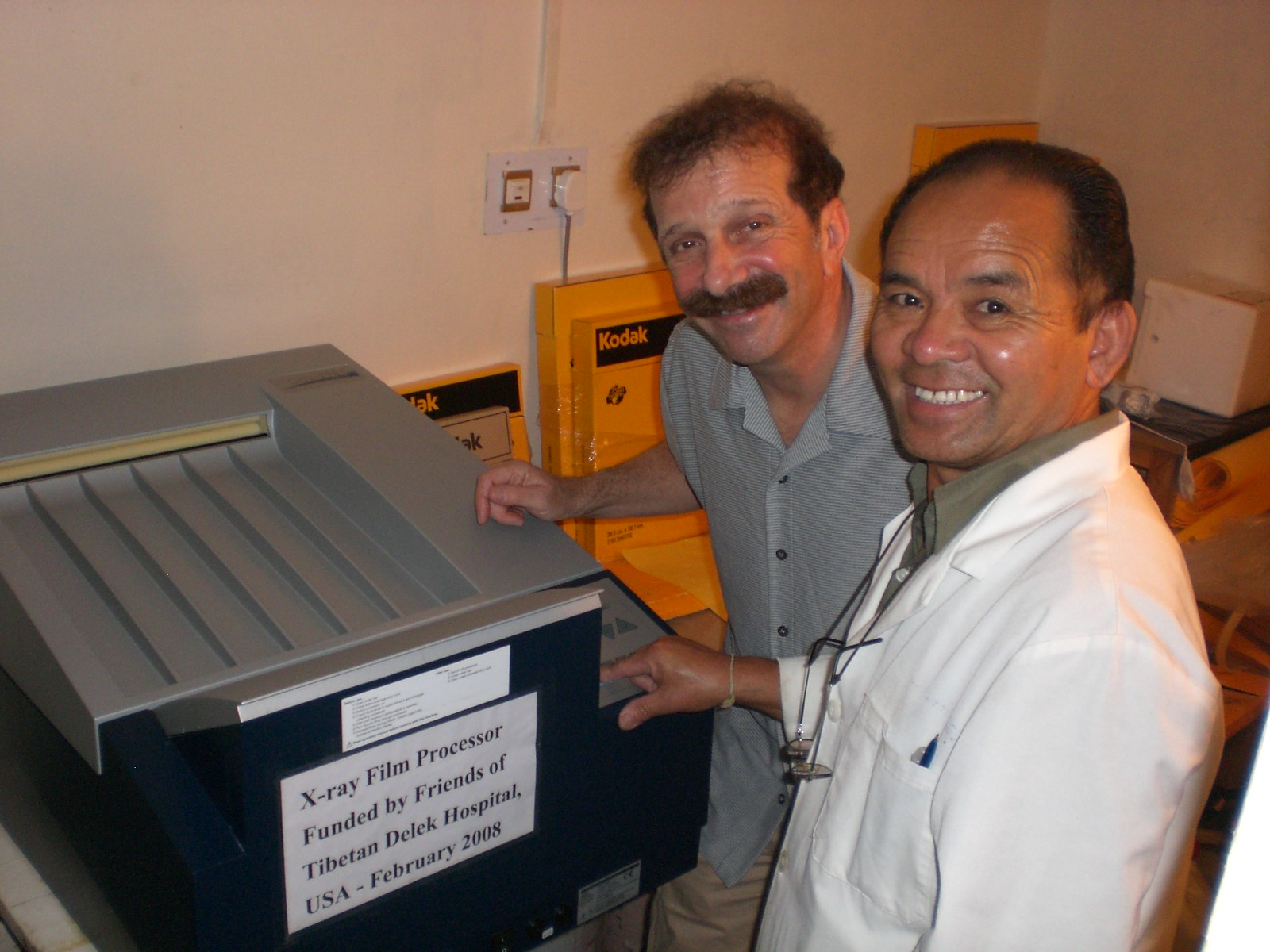
New donated Tibetan Delek Hospital X-ray film processor on 25 May 2008

In June 2008, the Delek hospital began a program to improve the control of tuberculosis in the Tibetan diaspora, supported by the Johns Hopkins University with the participation of Dr. Zorba Paster and Dr. Richard Chaisson, and the Associazione Italiana per la Solidarietà fra i Popoli (AISPO). The Rotary Club of Sunshine, based in Australia, participates in the financing of the program of tuberculosis control for Tibetan refugees.

== Location ==
It lies between Dharamsala and McLeod Ganj, near the Men-Tsee-Khang—a location that may facilitate collaboration between these medicines.

== See also ==
- Traditional Tibetan medicine
- List of organizations of Tibetans in exile

== Notes ==
=== References ===
- Rapport de fin de stage
