= Uyghuristan =

Uyghuristan (also spelled Uyghurstan, Uighuristan or Uighurstan), meaning "land of the Uyghurs", may refer to:

- East Turkestan, especially as a proposed independent Uyghur homeland in the Tarim Basin of China
- Xinjiang, an autonomous region of the People's Republic of China
- Qocho, a medieval Uyghur kingdom
- Turpan, city in Xinjiang
- Turpan Khanate, eastern part of Moghulistan

== See also ==
- History of the Uyghur people
