= Tibetan independence movement =

Independence movement in China

Flag of Tibet used by the exiled Central Tibetan Administration

Map of Greater Tibet within China, as claimed by Tibetan exile groups

Map of the Tibet Autonomous Region within China

The Tibetan independence movement (Tibetan: བོད་རང་བཙན Bod rang btsan; simplified Chinese: 西藏独立运动; traditional Chinese: 西藏獨立運動) is the political movement advocating for the reversal of the 1950 annexation of Tibet by the People's Republic of China, and the separation and independence of Greater Tibet from China.

It is principally led by the Tibetan diaspora in countries like India and the United States, and by celebrities and Tibetan Buddhists in the United States, India and Europe. The Central Tibetan Administration is based in Dharamshala, India.

The Tibetan independence movement is no longer supported by the U.S.'s Central Intelligence Agency, which ended its Tibetan program after the 1972 visit by Richard Nixon to China. Later in the 1970s, the 14th Dalai Lama, who had backed it since 1961, also withdrew his support but now supports the Middle-Way Approach.

== Historical background ==
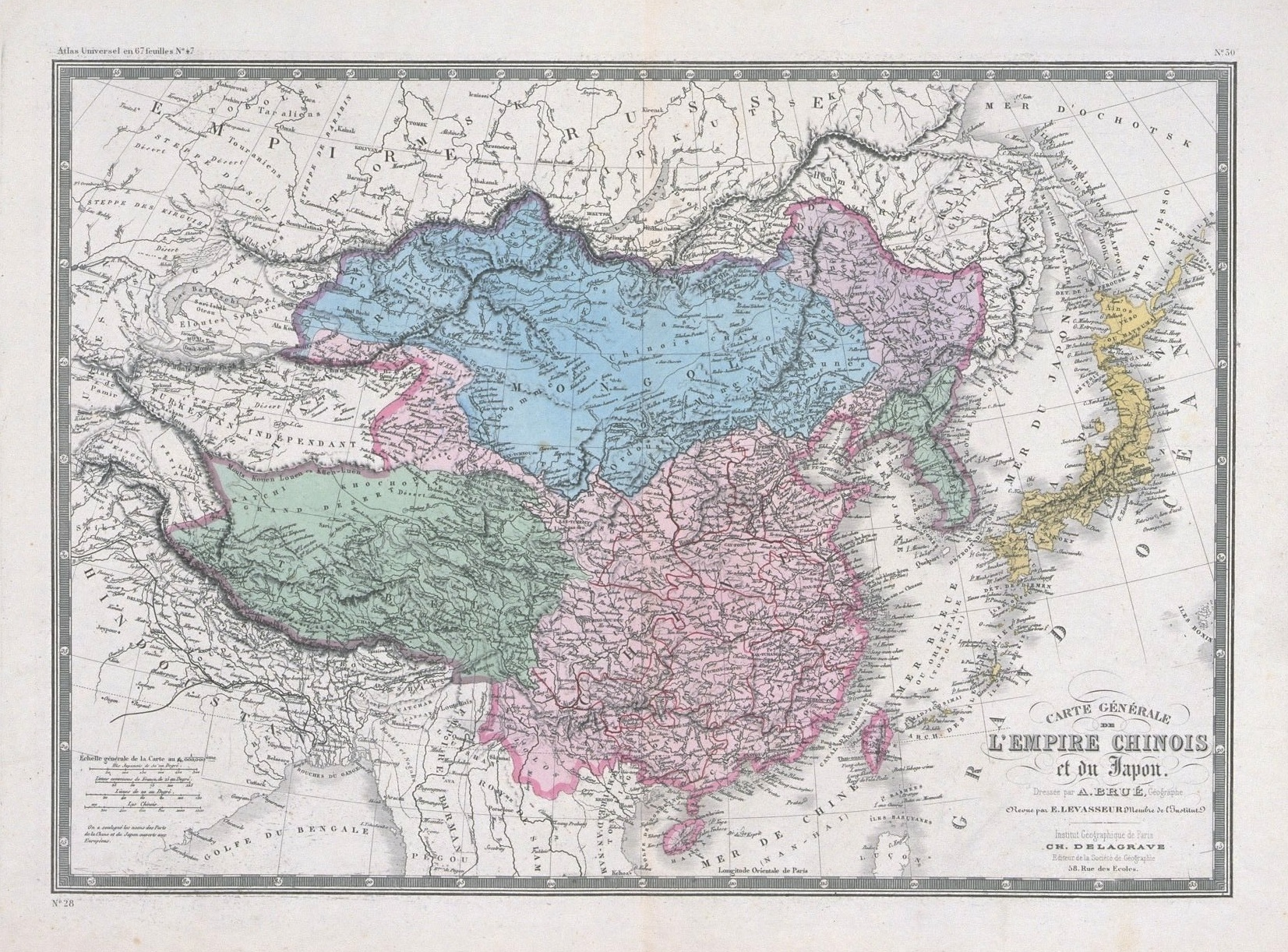
Map of East Asia in 1875, showing Qing China

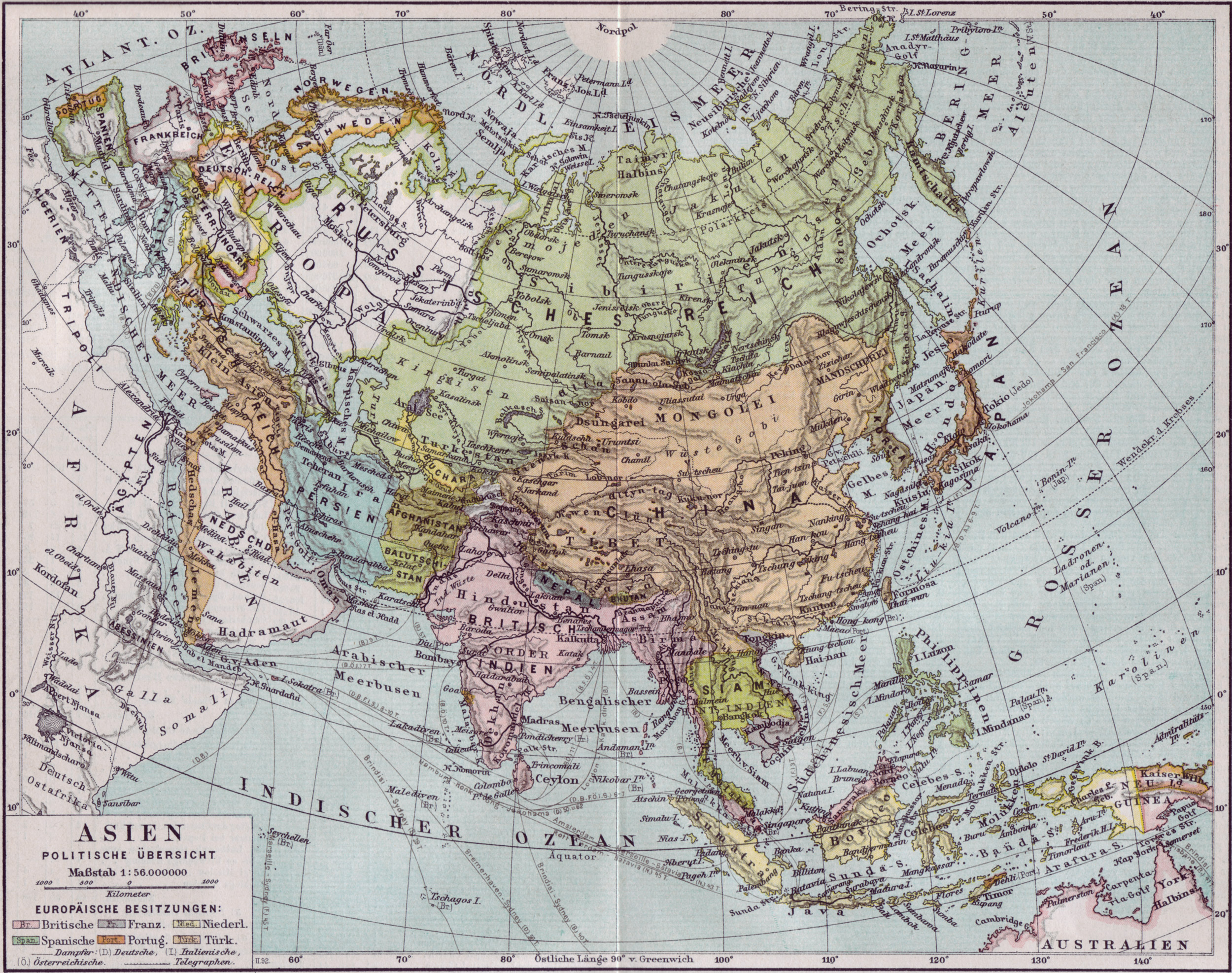
Map of Asia in 1890, showing Tibet within Qing China. The map was published in the Meyers Konversations-Lexikon in Leipzig in 1892.

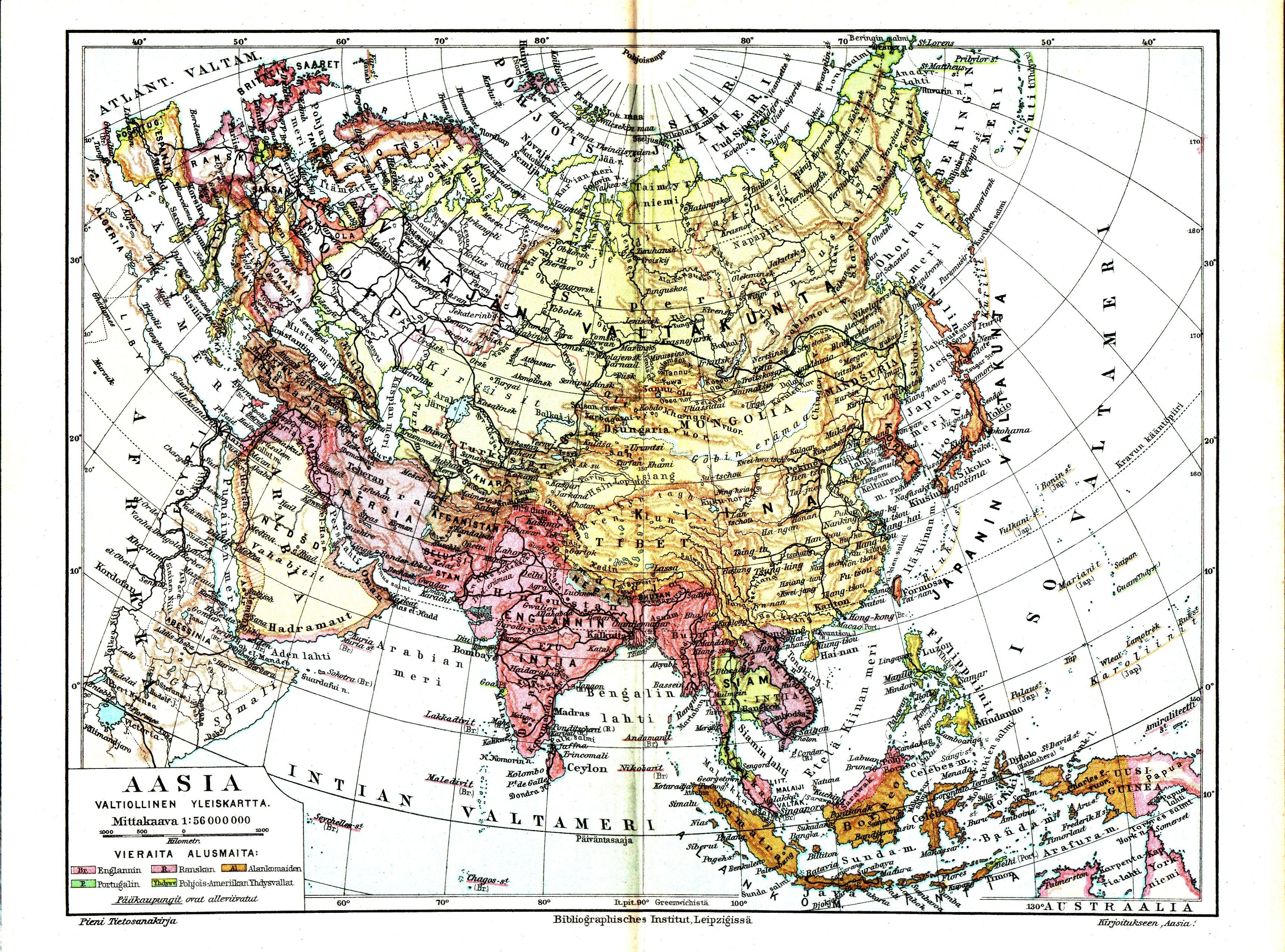
Map of Asia from the 1925 Finnish encyclopedia Pieni Tietosanakirja, depicting Tibet within Republican China

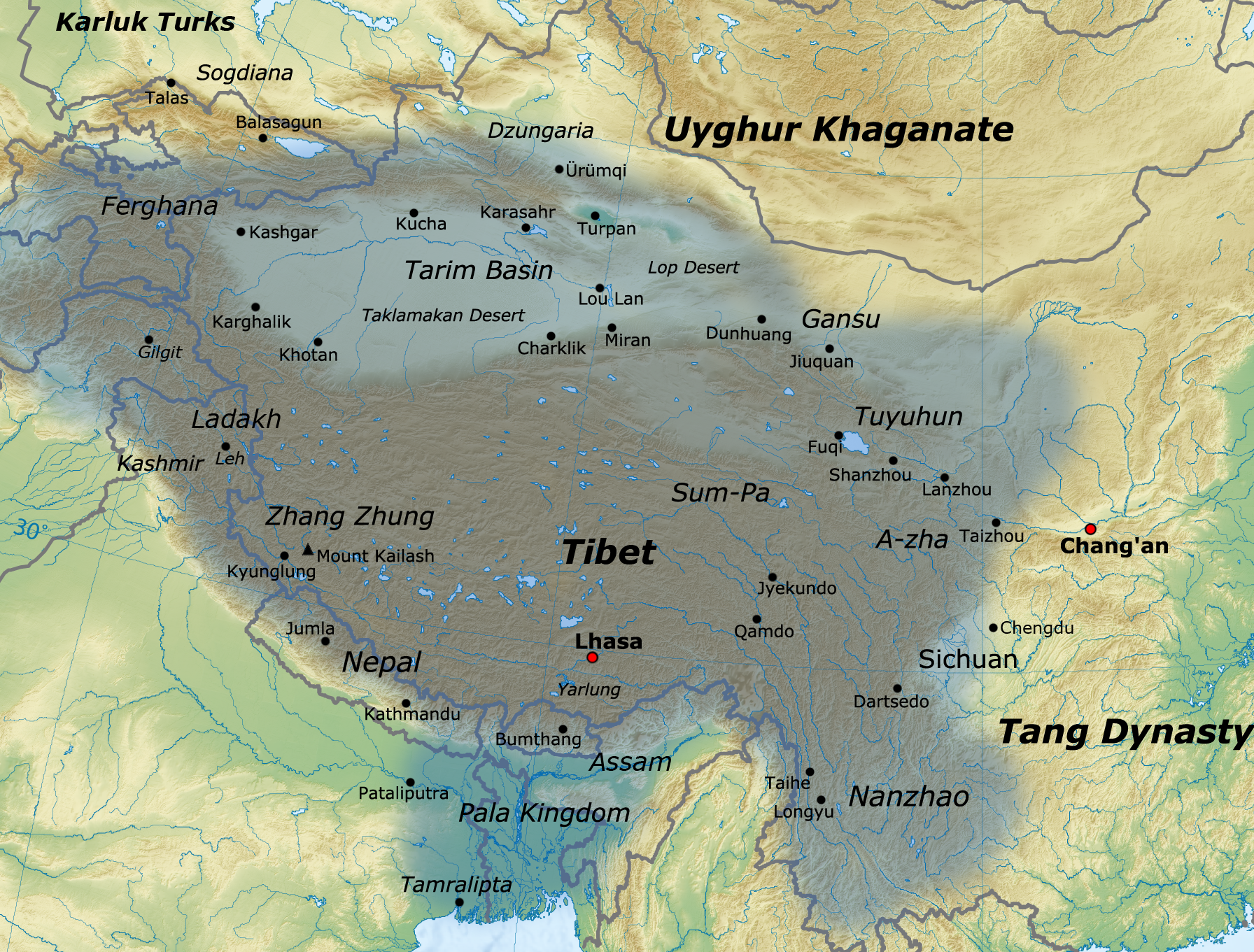
Map of the Tibetan Empire at its greatest extent between the 780s and the 790s CE

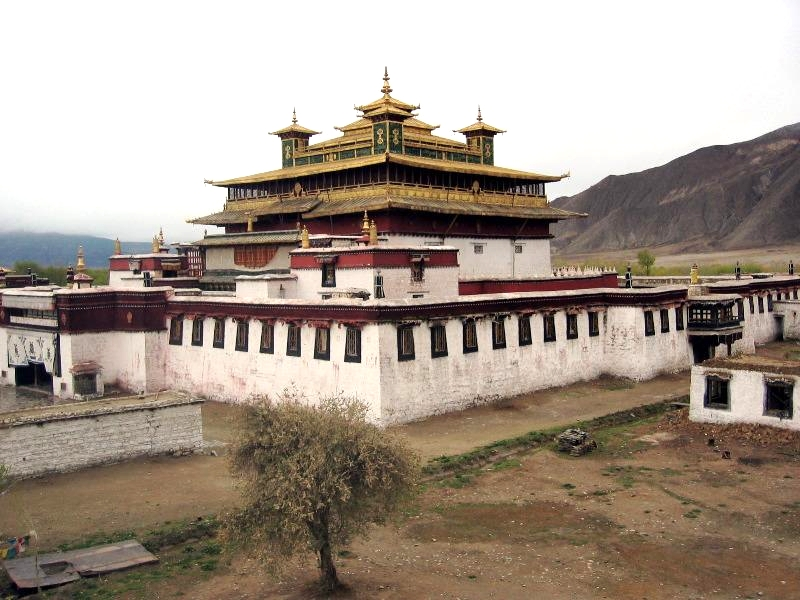
Samye was the first gompa (Buddhist monastery) built in Tibet (775–779).

=== Yuan and Ming dynasties ===
After the Mongol Prince Köden took control of the Kokonor region in 1239, he sent his general Doorda Darqan on a reconnaissance mission into Tibet in 1240. During this expedition the Kadampa monasteries of Rwa-sgreng and Rgyal-lha-khang were burned, and 500 people killed. The death of the Mongol qaghan Ögedei Khan in 1241 brought Mongol military activity around the world temporarily to a halt. Mongol interests in Tibet resumed in 1244, when Prince Köden sent an invitation to the leader of the Sakya sect, to come to his capital and formally surrender Tibet to the Mongols. The Sakya leader arrived in Kokonor with his two nephews Drogön Chögyal Phagpa ('Phags-pa; 1235–80) and Chana Dorje (Phyag-na Rdo-rje; 1239–67) in 1246. This event marked the incorporation of Tibet into the Mongol Empire. Tibet was under administrative rule of the Yuan dynasty until the 1360s. At that point, Tibet switched their allegiance to the newly established Ming dynasty, who granted Tibet greater autonomy. Each factions based their legitimation on the decrees of the Ming emperors, although by the 16th century Ming influence declined and Tibet became de facto independent.

=== Qing dynasty ===
In 1720, the Qing dynasty army entered Tibet in aid of the locals and defeated the invading forces of the Dzungar Khanate; thus began the period of Qing rule of Tibet. Later, the Chinese emperor assigned the Dalai Lama and Panchen Lama to be in charge of religious and political matters in Tibet. The Dalai Lama was leader of the area around Lhasa; the Panchen Lama was leader of the area of Shigatse Prefecture.

By the early 18th century, the Qing dynasty had started to send resident commissioners (Ambans) to Lhasa. Tibetan factions rebelled in 1750 and killed the resident commissioners after the central government decided to reduce the number of soldiers to about 100. The Qing army entered and defeated the rebels and reinstalled the resident commissioner. The number of soldiers in Tibet was kept at about 2,000. The defensive duties were assisted by a local force which was reorganized by the resident commissioner, and the Tibetan government continued to manage day-to-day affairs as before.

At multiple places such as Lhasa, Batang, Dartsendo, Lhari, Chamdo, and Litang, Green Standard Army troops were garrisoned throughout the Dzungar war. Green Standard Army troops and Manchu Bannermen were both part of the Qing force which fought in Tibet in the war against the Dzungars. It was said that the Sichuan commander Yue Zhongqi (a descendant of Yue Fei) entered Lhasa first when the 2,000 Green Standard soldiers and 1,000 Manchu soldiers of the "Sichuan route" seized Lhasa. According to Mark C. Elliott, after 1728 the Qing used Green Standard Army troops to man the garrison in Lhasa rather than Bannermen. According to Evelyn S. Rawski, both Green Standard Army and Bannermen made up the Qing garrison in Tibet. According to Sabine Dabringhaus, Green Standard Chinese soldiers numbering more than 1,300 were stationed by the Qing in Tibet to support the 3,000-strong Tibetan army.

In the mid 19th century, arriving with an Amban, a community of Chinese troops from Sichuan who married Tibetan women settled down in the Lubu neighborhood of Lhasa, where their descendants established a community and assimilated into Tibetan culture. Hebalin was the location of where Chinese Muslim troops and their offspring lived, while Lubu was the place where Han Chinese troops and their offspring lived.

In 1904, the British Empire launched an expedition to Tibet to counter perceived Russian influence in the region. The expedition, which initially set out with the stated goal of resolving border disputes between Tibet and Sikkim, quickly turned into an invasion of Tibet. The forces of the expedition invaded and captured Lhasa, with the 13th Dalai Lama fleeing to the countryside. After the British captured Lhasa, a treaty was signed between the two nations, known as the Convention Between Great Britain and Tibet, which gained for the British great economic influence in the region while ensuring that Tibet remained under Chinese control. Just two years later, however, the British signed a new treaty with the Qing government, known as the Convention Between Great Britain and China Respecting Tibet, which affirmed Chinese control of Tibet. The British agreed not to annex or interfere in Tibet in return for indemnity from the Chinese government, while China engaged "not to permit any other foreign state to interfere with the territory or internal administration of Tibet".

The Anglo-Chinese Convention of 1906 recognized Chinese suzerainty over the region. The Anglo-Russian Convention of 1907, without Lhasa's or Beijing's acknowledgement, recognized the suzerainty of China over Tibet. The Qing central government claimed for sovereignty and direct rule over Tibet in 1910. The 13th Dalai Lama fled to British India in February 1910. In the same month, the Chinese government issued a proclamation 'deposing' the Dalai Lama and instigating the search for a new incarnation. When he returned from exile, the Dalai Lama declared Tibetan independence (1912).

=== Republic of China ===
The 1911 Revolution ended the Qing dynasty, and the claim to Tibet was passed down to the Republic of China in the Imperial Edict of the Abdication of the Qing Emperor. However the subsequent outbreak of World War I and civil war in China meant that Chinese factions controlled only parts of Tibet. The government of the 13th Dalai Lama, who declared Tibet's independence, controlled Ü-Tsang (Dbus-gtsang) and western Kham, roughly coincident with the borders of the Tibet Autonomous Region today, and was recognized by the Bogd Khanate in outer Mongolia but not by other countries. Eastern Kham, separated from it by the Yangtze River, was under the control of Chinese warlord Liu Wenhui. The situation in Amdo (Qinghai) was more complicated, with the Xining area controlled by warlord Ma Bufang (of Hui ethnicity), who constantly strove to exert control over the rest of Amdo (Qinghai). General Ma Fuxiang (also of Hui ethnicity) was the chairman of the Mongolian and Tibetan Affairs Commission and a supporter of Tibet as an integral part of the Republic of China.

=== People's Republic of China ===
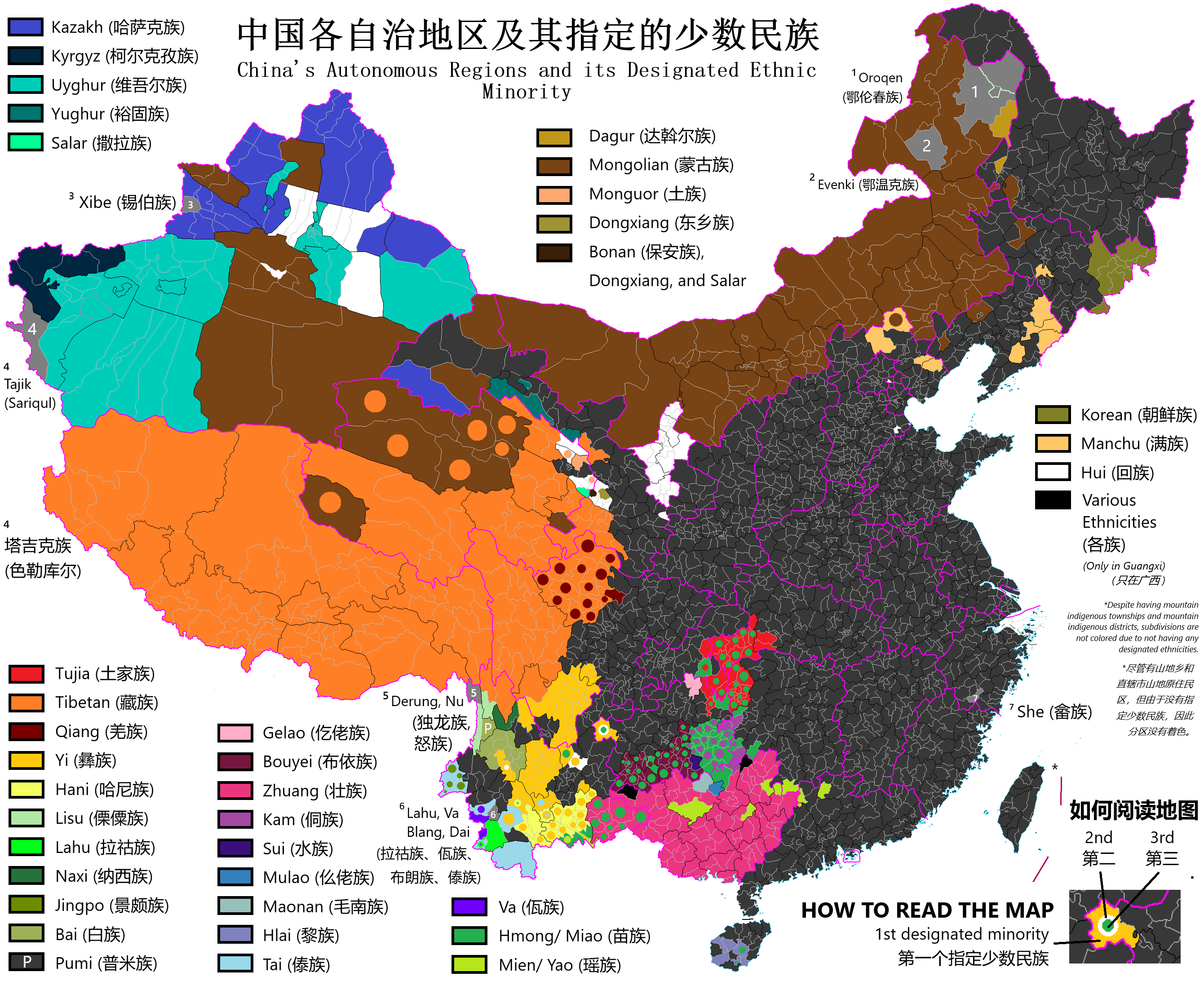
China's Autonomous Regions and its Designated Ethnic Minority

In 1950, the People's Liberation Army of the People's Republic of China invaded Tibet, after taking over the rest of China from the Republic of China during the five years of civil war. In 1951, the Seventeen Point Agreement for the Peaceful Liberation of Tibet, a treaty signed by representatives of the Dalai Lama and the Panchen Lama, established that the region would be ruled by a joint administration under representatives of the central government and the Tibetan government.

The Chinese have claimed that most of the population of Tibet at that time were serfs, bound to land owned by lamas. This claim has been challenged by other researchers (see serfdom in Tibet controversy). Any attempt at land reform or the redistribution of wealth would have proved unpopular with the established landowners. The Seventeen Point Agreement was put into effect only in Tibet proper; ergo, eastern Kham and Amdo, being outside the administration of the government of Tibet, were treated like territory belonging to any other Chinese province, with land reform implemented in full. As a result, a rebellion broke out in these regions in June 1956. The rebellion eventually spread to Lhasa, but was crushed by 1959. The 14th Dalai Lama and other government principals fled to exile in India.

== CIA and MI6 activities in Tibet (1950–1970) ==
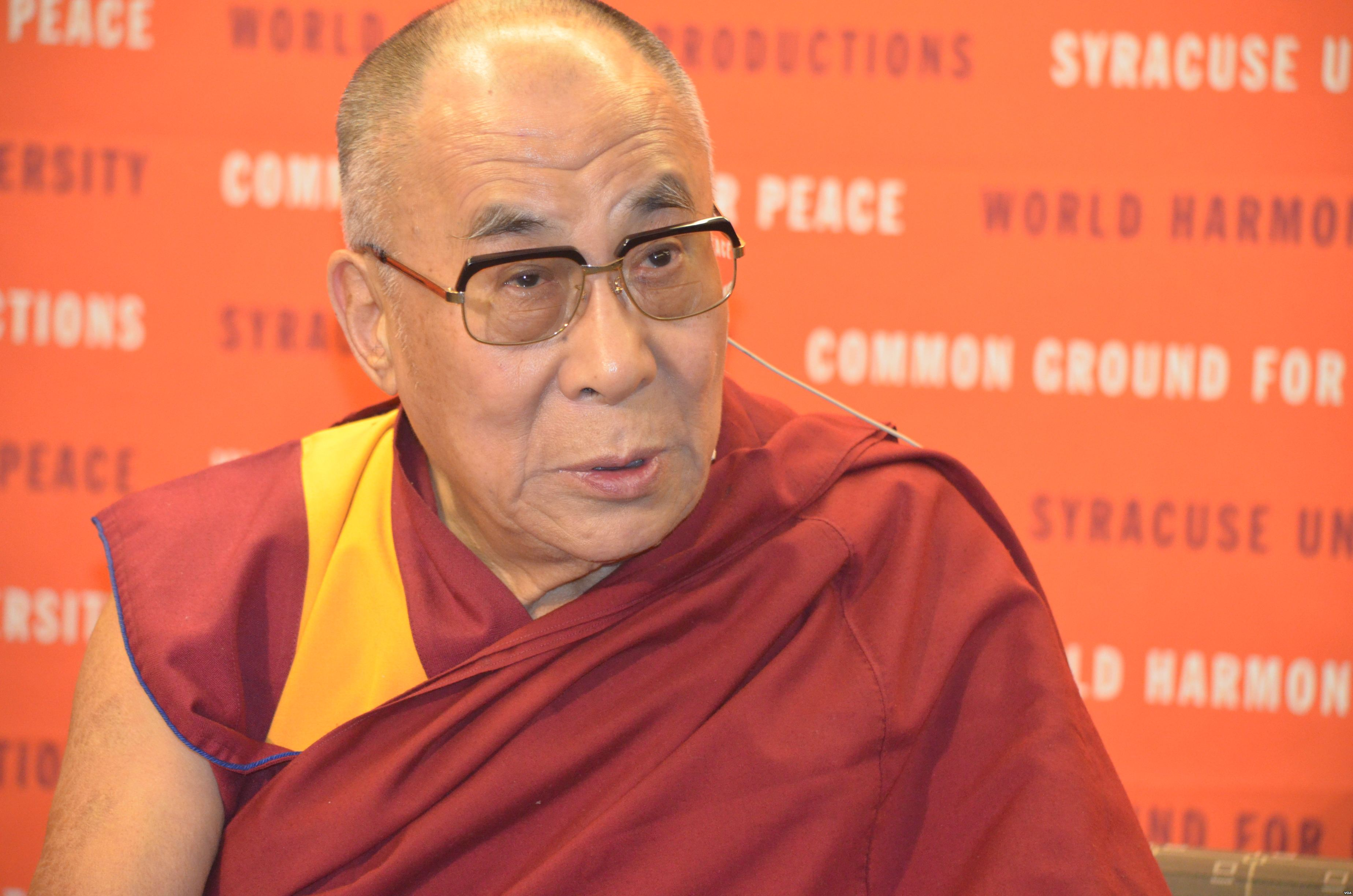
According to the 14th Dalai Lama, the CIA supported the Tibetan independence movement in the 1960s "not because they (the CIA) cared about Tibetan independence, but as part of their worldwide efforts to destabilize all communist governments".

Agents of Western governments had infiltrated Tibet by the mid-1950s, a few years after Tibet had been annexed by the People's Republic of China. Beginning in the 1950s, the United States' Central Intelligence Agency (CIA) trained Tibetans as paramilitaries. British MI6 agent Sydney Wignall, in his autobiography, reveals that he and John Harrop travelled to Tibet together in 1955 posing as mountaineers. Captured by the Chinese authority, Wignall recalled that he was surprised to find two CIA agents were already under Chinese detention.

Clandestine military involvement by the U.S. began following the series of uprisings in the eastern Tibetan region of Kham in 1956. Several small groups of Khampa fighters were trained by the CIA camp and then airdropped back into Tibet with supplies. In 1958, with the rebellion in Kham ongoing, two of these fighters, Athar and Lhotse, attempted to meet with the Dalai Lama to determine whether he would cooperate with their activities. However, their request for an audience was refused by the Lord Chamberlain, Phala Thubten Wonden, who believed such a meeting would be impolitic. According to Tsering Shakya, "Phala never told the Dalai Lama or the Kashag of the arrival of Athar and Lhotse. Nor did he inform the Dalai Lama of American willingness to provide aid."

Following a mass uprising in Lhasa in 1959 during the celebration of the Tibetan New Year and the ensuing Chinese military response, the Dalai Lama went into exile in India. The Dalai Lama's escape was assisted by the CIA. After 1959, the CIA trained Tibetan guerrillas and provided funds and weapons for the fight against China. However, assistance was reduced during the course of the 1960s and finally ended when President Richard Nixon decided to seek rapprochement with Communist China in the early 1970s. Kenneth Conboy and James Morrison, in The CIA's Secret War in Tibet, reveal how the CIA encouraged Tibetan revolt against China — and eventually came to control its fledgling resistance movement.

The New York Times reported on 2 October 1998 that the Tibetan exile movement received $1.7 million a year in the 1960s from the CIA. The Dalai Lama said in his autobiography that his brothers were responsible and that they didn't tell him about it, knowing what his reaction would be. Lodi Gyari, the Dalai Lama's personal representative in Washington, said he had no knowledge of the annual subsidy of $180,000 marked as for the Dalai Lama or how it was spent. The government in exile say they knew that the CIA trained and equipped Tibetan guerrillas who raided Tibet from a base camp in Nepal, and that the effect of those operations "only resulted in more suffering for the people of Tibet. Worse, these activities gave the Chinese government the opportunity to blame the efforts of those seeking to regain Tibetan independence on the activities of foreign powers—whereas, of course, it was an entirely Tibetan initiative." The budget figures for the CIA's Tibetan program were as follows:

- Subsidy to the Dalai Lama: US$180,000
- Support of 2,100 Tibetan guerrillas based in Nepal: US$500,000
- Other costs: US$1.06m
- Total: US$1.73m

== Positions on the status of Tibet ==
The status of Tibet before 1951, especially in the period between 1912 and 1951, is largely recognized by most scholars as de facto independent, since Dalai Lama's Govt in Lhasa ruled Tibet without any interference from foreign powers.

According to supporters of Tibetan independence, Tibet was a distinct nation and state independent between the fall of the Mongol Empire in 1368 and subjugation by the Qing Dynasty in 1720; and again between the fall of the Qing Dynasty in 1912 and its incorporation into the PRC in 1951. Moreover, even during the periods of nominal subjugation to the Yuan and Qing, Tibet was largely self-governing. As such, the Central Tibetan Administration (CTA) views current PRC rule in Tibet as illegitimate, motivated solely by the natural resources and strategic value of Tibet, and in violation of both Tibet's historical status as an independent country and the right of the Tibetan people to self-determination. It also points to PRC's autocratic and divide-and-rule policies, and assimilationist policies, regarding those as an example of imperialism bent on destroying Tibet's distinct ethnic makeup, culture, and identity, thereby cementing it as an indivisible part of China. After the fall of the Qing Dynasty, both Mongolia and Tibet declared independence and recognized each other as such.

On the other hand, opponents assert that the PRC rules Tibet legitimately, by saying that Tibet has been part of Chinese history since the 7th century as the Tibetan Empire had close interactions with the Chinese dynasties through royal marriage. In addition to the de facto power that the Chinese has since then, Yuan Dynasty conquest in the 13th century and that all subsequent Chinese governments (Ming Dynasty, Qing Dynasty, Republic of China, and People's Republic of China) have been exercising de jure sovereignty power over Tibet.

In addition, as this position argues that no country other than Outer Mongolia gave Tibet diplomatic recognition between 1912 and 1951, they argue that the government of the Republic of China continued to maintain sovereignty over the region, and the leaders of Tibet themselves acknowledged Chinese sovereignty by sending delegates to the following: the Drafting Committee for a new constitution of the Republic of China in 1925, the National Assembly of the Republic of China in 1931, the fourth National Congress of the Kuomintang in 1931, the National Constituent Assembly of the Republic of China, which drafted a new Chinese constitution in 1946, and finally to another National Assembly for drafting a new Chinese constitution in 1948. Finally, some within the PRC considers all movements aimed at ending Chinese sovereignty in Tibet, starting with the expedition of 1904, to the CTA today, as one interconnected campaign abetted by malicious Western powers aimed at destroying Chinese integrity and sovereignty, thereby weakening China's position in the world. The PRC also points to what it calls the autocratic and theocratic policies of the government of Tibet before 1959, as well as its renunciation of South Tibet, claimed by China as a part of historical Tibet occupied by India, as well as the Dalai Lama's association with India, and as such claims the CTA has no moral legitimacy to govern Tibet.

== Positions on Tibet after 1950 ==
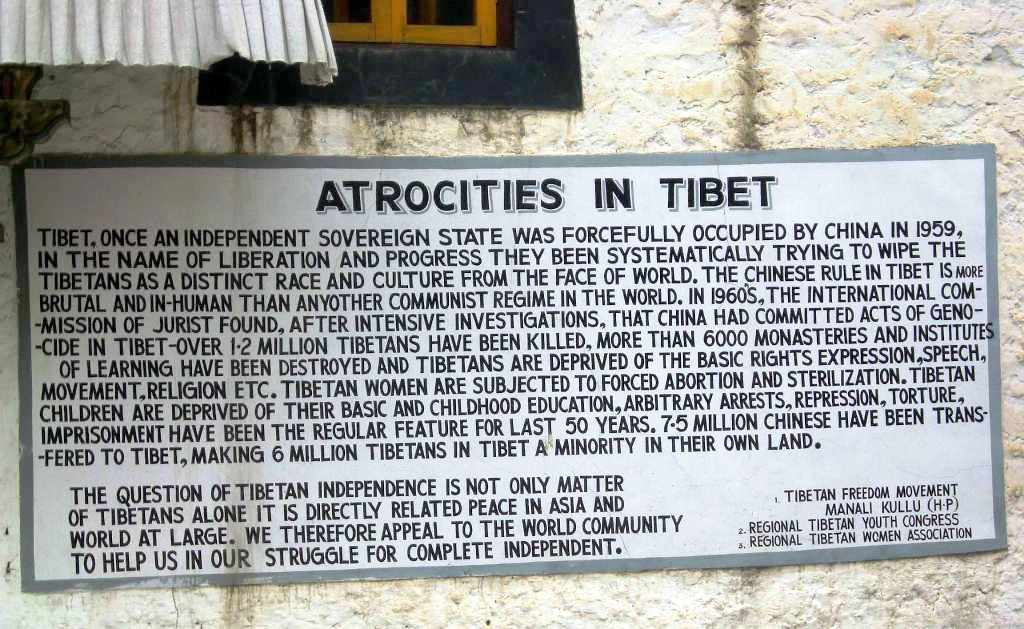
Atrocities in Tibet sign. Manali

Tibetan exiles generally say that the number that have died in the Great Leap Forward, violence, or other unnatural causes since 1950 is approximately 1.2 million. However, this number is controversial. According to Patrick French, a supporter of the Tibetan cause who was able to view the data and calculations, the estimate is not reliable because the Tibetans were not able to process the data well enough to produce a credible total, with many persons double or triple counted. There were, however, many casualties, perhaps as many as 400,000. This figure is extrapolated from a calculation Warren W. Smith made from census reports of Tibet which show 200,000 "missing" from Tibet. Even anti-Communist resources such as the Black Book of Communism expresses doubt at the 1.2 million figure, but does note that according to the Chinese census, the total population of ethnic Tibetans in the PRC was 2.8 million in 1953, but only 2.5 million in 1964. It puts forward a figure of 800,000 deaths and alleges that as many as 10% of Tibetans were interned, with few survivors. Chinese demographers have estimated that 90,000 of the 300,000 "missing" Tibetans fled the region.

The Central Tibetan Administration also says that millions of Chinese immigrants to the TAR are diluting the Tibetans both culturally and through intermarriage. Exile groups say that despite recent attempts to restore the appearance of original Tibetan culture to attract tourism, the traditional Tibetan way of life is now irrevocably changed. It is also reported that when Hu Yaobang, the general secretary of the Chinese Communist Party, visited Lhasa in 1980, he was unhappy when he found out the region was behind neighbouring provinces. Reforms were instituted, and since then the central government's policy in Tibet has granted most religious freedoms, but monks and nuns were sometimes imprisoned, and many Tibetans (mostly monks and nuns) fled Tibet yearly.

The government of the PRC claims that the population of Tibet in 1737 was about 8 million. It claims that due to the 'backward' rule of the local theocracy, there was rapid decrease in the next two hundred years and the population in 1959 was only about one million. Today, the population of Greater Tibet is 7.3 million, of which 5 million is ethnic Tibetan, according to the 2000 census. According to the PRC the increase is viewed as the result of the abolishment of the theocracy and introduction of a modern, higher standard of living. Based on the census numbers, the PRC also rejects claims that the Tibetans are being swamped by Han Chinese; instead the PRC says that the border for Greater Tibet drawn by the government of Tibet in Exile is so large that it incorporates regions such as Xining that are not traditionally Tibetan in the first place, hence exaggerating the number of non-Tibetans.

The government of the PRC also rejects claims that the lives of Tibetans have deteriorated, pointing to rights enjoyed by the Tibetan language in education and in courts and says that the lives of Tibetans have been improved immensely compared to the Dalai Lama's rule before 1950. Benefits that are commonly quoted include: the GDP of Tibet Autonomous Region (TAR) today is 30 times that before 1950; it has 22,500 km of highways, all built since 1950; all secular education in the region was created after integration into the PRC; there are 25 scientific research institutes, all built by the PRC; infant mortality has dropped from 43% in 1950 to 0.661% in 2000; life expectancy has risen from 35.5 years in 1950 to 67 in 2000; the collection and publishing of the traditional Epic of King Gesar, which is the longest epic poem in the world and had only been handed down orally before; allocation of 300 million Renminbi since the 1980s to the maintenance and protection of Tibetan monasteries.

== Supporting organisations ==
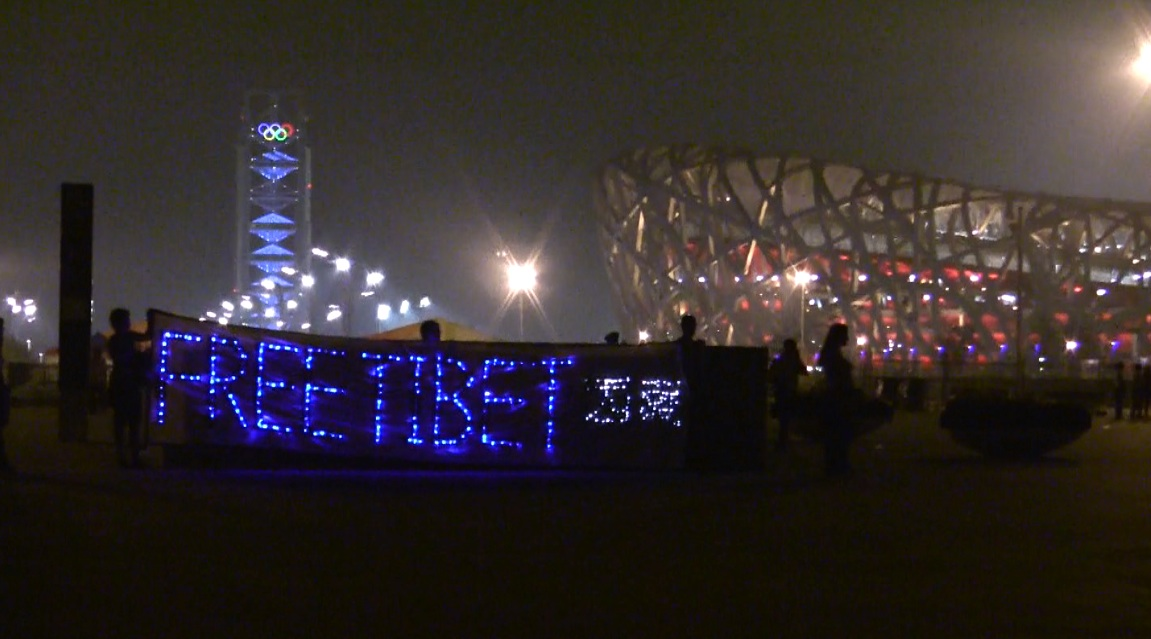
"Free Tibet" LED Banner at Bird's Nest, Beijing, 19 August 2008

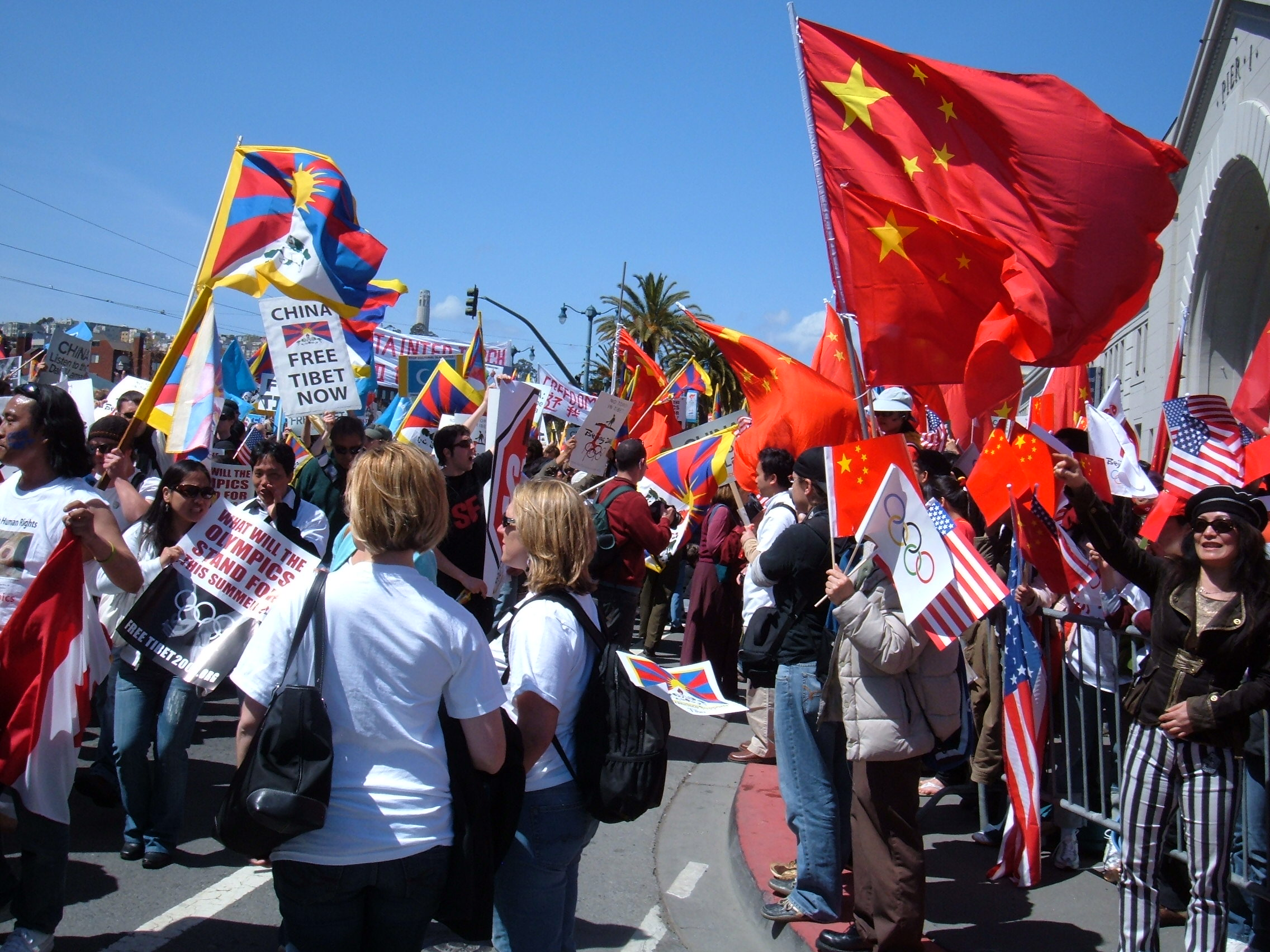
Pro-Tibetan protesters come into contact with pro-Chinese protesters in San Francisco.

Organisations which support the Tibetan independence movement include:

- Tibetan Youth Congress – Located at Dharamsala, the seat of the Government of Tibet in Exile in India, claims 30,000 members.
- International Tibet Independence Movement – Located in Indiana, United States. It was formed in March 1995 and is now a 501(c)(3) non-profit organization for informing about Tibetan independence.
- International Tibetan Aid Organization – Located in Amsterdam, Netherlands, this organization was formed in 2004.

However, Tenzin Gyatso, the current Dalai Lama, the spiritual leader of Tibetan Buddhists, is no longer calling for independence. He has spoken in many international venues, including the United States Congress, and the European Parliament. In 1987, he has also started campaigning for a peaceful resolution to the issue of the status of Tibet, and has since then advocated that Tibet should not become independent, but that it should be given meaningful autonomy within the People's Republic of China. This approach is known as the Middle Way. In November 2017, he stated that "the past was the past", and that he believed that China after opening up its economy, has changed 40 to 50 percent of what it was earlier. He claimed that Tibetans didn't want independence and instead wanted to stay and have more economic development from China. In October 2020, he stated that he did not support Tibetan independence and hoped to visit China as a Nobel Prize winner. He said, "I prefer the concept of a 'republic' in the People's Republic of China. In the concept of republic, ethnic minorities are like Tibetans, the Mongols, Manchus, and Xinjiang Uyghurs, we can live in harmony".

Some organisations either support the Middle Way or do not adopt a definitive stance on whether they support independence or greater autonomy. Such organisations include:

- Free Tibet Campaign – Located in London, United Kingdom, formed in 1987, stands for the right of Tibetans to determine their own future and for the future of their own country.
- International Tibet Support Network – Located in London, United Kingdom, established in 2000, umbrella organization for Tibet related organization worldwide.
- Shiv Ganga Vidya Mandir, Phaphamau, Allahabad organized a Tibet Freedom Solidarity Rally in Allahabad on 9 April 2016, drawing more than 3000 participants.

== Celebrity support, Freedom Concerts and public awareness ==
The Tibetan independence movement became cause-célèbre in the US and Europe as the words "Free Tibet" and the Tibetan flag gained worldwide fame in the press and public consciousness starting from 1987. The movement gained strength and popular support in the west from 1987 to 2008, until the 2008 Tibetan unrest. The initial spark for the awareness of "Free Tibet" and the Tibetan flag was probably street demonstrations, perhaps specifically the 1986 Ottawa demonstration in Canada.

Eventually, The flag of Tibet and words were printed globally on t-shirts, cushions, mugs, bookmarks, badges, bracelets, bags and other merchandise, and almost all Westerners became aware of the cause of Tibetan independence.

The "Free Tibet" movement is supported by some celebrities, such as Richard Gere and Paris Hilton.

British comedian Russell Brand also occasionally mentions his support for the movement on his BBC Radio 2 show. Richard Gere is one of the most outspoken supporters of the movement and is chairman of the board of directors for the International Campaign for Tibet. Actress Sharon Stone caused significant controversy when she suggested that the 2008 Sichuan earthquake may have been the result of "bad karma," because the Chinese "are not being nice to the Dalai Lama, who is a good friend of mine." The Dalai Lama confirmed that he did not share Stone's views, although he confirmed that he had "met the lady".

U.S. actor and martial artist Steven Seagal has been an active supporter of Tibetan independence for several decades and makes regular donations to various Tibetan charities around the world. He has been recognized by Tibetan Lama Penor Rinpoche as the reincarnation of tulku Chungdrag Dorje, the treasure revealer of Palyul Monastery. He also claims to have the special ability of clairvoyance; in a November 2006 interview, he stated: "I was born very different, clairvoyant and a healer".

The Milarepa Fund is an organisation which organises concerts to give publicity to the Tibetan independence movement. The fund was named after Milarepa, the revered 11th-century Tibetan yogi, who used music to enlighten people. It was originally established to disburse royalties from the Beastie Boys album Ill Communication in 1994, to benefit Tibetan monks who were sampled on two songs. The Milarepa Fund organizers also jointed the Beastie Boys as they headlined the 1994 Lollapalooza Tour. Inspired by this tour, they began to organise a concert to promote Tibetan independence, in the style of Live Aid.

Organized in June 1996, the first concert (in San Francisco) opened with Icelandic singer Björk and featured acts such as Radiohead, The Smashing Pumpkins, Cibo Matto, Rage Against the Machine, Red Hot Chili Peppers, and De La Soul. The concerts continued for three more years, which helped to generate publicity for the Tibetan independence movement. It also reportedly led to the growth of Tibetan independence organisations such as Students for a Free Tibet and Free Tibet Campaign worldwide.

Gorillaz, the virtual band have shown support through a TV spot showing animated frontman, 2D, meditating with fellow supporters outside of the Chinese embassy, followed by a brief message encouraging people to join the Free Tibet Campaign. In addition, during the holographic performances of "Clint Eastwood", 2D is wearing a shirt saying "FREE TIBET."

During the 2008 Liège–Bastogne–Liège cycling race Australian rider Cadel Evans wore an undershirt with 'Free Tibet' printed on it, bringing attention to the movement months before the 2008 Summer Olympics, held in Beijing.

In 2011, an Indian film Rockstar depicted poster of 'Free Tibet' slogan in Sadda Haq song. People waving the Free Tibet flag in the backdrop was shown in the song video. This triggered a dispute between Central Board of Film Certification and film director Imtiaz Ali when the Board ordered Ali to blur the flag and Free Tibet slogan before the film hit the theatre, but the director refused to do it. However, Ali had to remove the sequence from the video to get the film's censor done. Deletion of the Tibetan flag from the video caused wide protests in Tibet, Dharamsala and other parts of India. The uncut version with flag was screened at Beijing International Film Festival in 2013.

== See also ==
- Cantonese nationalism
- List of active separatist movements
- Tibet under Yuan rule
- Sino-Tibetan relations during the Ming dynasty
- Tibet under Qing rule
- Patron and priest relationship
- Tibet (1912–51)
- Treaty of friendship and alliance between the Government of Mongolia and Tibet
- Protests and uprisings in Tibet since 1950
- Secession in China
- Affirmative action in China
- Human rights of ethnic minorities in China
- Boycott Chinese products
- Students for a Free Tibet
- Sinicization of Tibet
- Stateless nation
- Racism in China
- Ethnic conflicts in Kazakhstan
- Uyghuristan (disambiguation)
- Ethnic minorities in China
- Ethnic issues in China
- Local ethnic nationalism
- List of ethnic groups in China
