= Students for a Free Tibet =

Global network for the independence of Tibet

- Founded: 1994
- Type: Non-profit
- Headquarters: 602 East 14th Street, 2nd Floor New York, NY, USA
- Fields: Human rights in Tibet, Tibetan independence
- Website: studentsforafreetibet.org

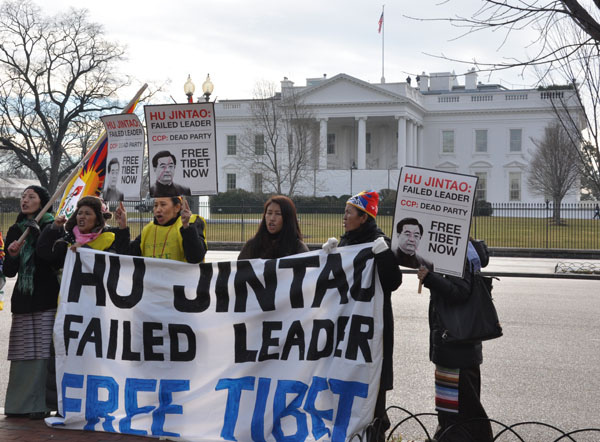
Students for a Free Tibet members protested against China in front of the White House

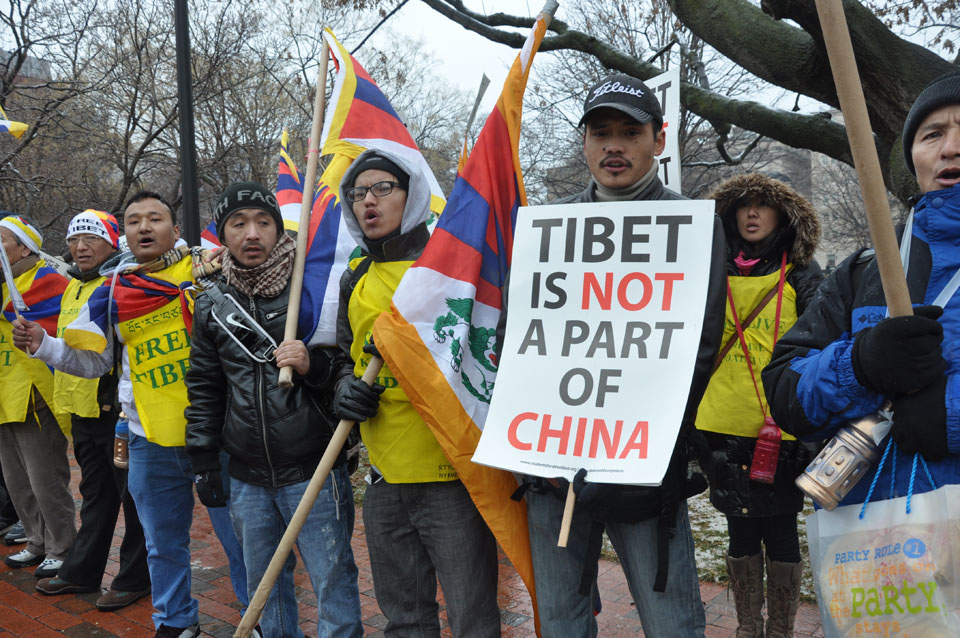
Students for a Free Tibet Protesters marched to Lafayette Park from the Chinese Embassy in Washington D.C.

Students For a Free Tibet (SFT) is a global grassroots network of students and activists working in solidarity with the Tibetan people for human rights and freedom. The group uses education, advocacy, and nonviolent direct action with the goal of achieving Tibetan independence. SFT advocates self-determination for Tibet because of Tibet's historical status as well as opposing the Chinese government's violation of the Tibetan people's human rights, cultural heritage, environment, language and religion.

== History ==
Students for a Free Tibet (SFT) was founded in 1994 by pro-independence Tibetans, supporters, and students in New York City to use the influence of youth in order to press for human rights and independence in Tibet. Initially, SFT's activities were focused on raising awareness amongst fellow students and young people on campuses and at events such as the 1994 Lollapalooza music tour. Students for a Free Tibet's profile and membership grew with the advent of the Tibetan Freedom Concerts, which provided a vehicle for youth involvement in the Tibetan independence movement.

Currently, SFT is an international network of more than 650 chapters at universities, colleges, high schools, and communities in over 100 countries. SFT's International Headquarters remains in New York City. There are also a few satellite offices and organizing hubs; SFT Canada has an office in Toronto, Ontario, SFT India has an office in Dharamsala, India, and SFT UK has an office in London.

== Programs ==
SFT's campaigns focus on three areas: political, economic, and human rights. SFT's political campaigns are focused on generally advocating for Tibetan independence by pressuring both Chinese officials as well as SFT members' government representatives. SFT is well known for high-profile protests against Chinese dignitaries when they visit foreign countries. SFT's human rights campaigns are focused on improving the situation for Tibetans in Tibet by advocating for increased freedoms and rights, and for the release of political prisoners and dissidents. But its website maintains, "When we say 'Free Tibet' we don't just mean, 'Make things better in Tibet.' We mean 'Free the nation of Tibet from Chinese occupation.'"

The stated long-term goal for SFT's economic campaign is to make Tibet "too costly for the Chinese government to maintain." One such campaign, held in conjunction with other organizations which promote regime change in China, urged consumers not to buy products "made in China". The American media commented on the extreme difficulty of such an endeavor; a commentator from The Christian Science Monitor expressed her belief that "the solutions to those concerns and others lie in turning toward China, rather than away."

Students for a Free Tibet's "Leadership Training" is focused on developing representatives for the Tibetan independence movement. Part of this is the annual "Free Tibet! Action Camp" at which dozens of young people gather for a week-long activism training session.

== Actions ==
Students for a Free Tibet is perhaps best known for its high-profile actions on Mount Everest, the Great Wall of China, and on the Golden Gate Bridge. In March and April 2008, the group's participation in organizing protests and disrupting the Olympic torch relay was criticized by many Chinese nationals. Nevertheless, it succeeded in focusing international attention on the worsening religious, cultural and political situation in Tibet.

In 2000, SFT and other Tibetan independence groups controversially launched complaints to the World Bank against the implementation of its loan in 1999 for the China Western Poverty Reduction Project. The groups claimed that the project, to provide irrigation, land improvement, and construction of basic roads to inaccessible mountainous and semi-arid areas in central and western China, would push Chinese migration into Qinghai and "suffocate the Tibetan way of life there". In response, the World Bank president proposed to delay the project for "deeper environmental review", but China withdrew its application to fund the project with its own resources. The Chinese Executive Director criticized the groups, saying "We regret that because of political opposition... the World Bank has lost a good opportunity to assist some of the poorest people... in the world".

== See also ==
- List of organizations of Tibetans in exile
- Tibetan independence movement
- Amnesty International
- Central Tibetan Administration
- International Tibet Network
