= List of organizations of Tibetans in exile =

This page is a list of organisations of Tibetans in exile. Most of the organisations listed are groups of ethnic Tibetans outside of Tibet and based in Dharamsala. The Dharamshala Indian community materialised around the Dalai Lama, who moved there from Tibet after the 1959 unrest in Tibet. There are cultural groups, religious groups, and political groups, some of which promote the goals of the Tibetan independence movement.

== Organisations of Tibetans in exile ==
- Association of Tibetan Journalists, based in Dharamshala, India.
- Central Tibetan Administration, also referred to as the Tibetan Government in Exile. Tibet's democratically elected government based in Dharamshala, India.
- Chushi Gangdruk (Tibet's volunteer defender of Faith), was based in New York City, USA
- Dalai Lama Center for Peace and Education
- Empowering the Vision Project, based in New Delhi, India.
- Foundation for Universal Responsibility of His Holiness the Dalai Lama
- International Tibet Support Network, based in San Francisco, California, USA
- International Association of Tibetan Studies
- Khawa Karpo-Tibet Culture Centre, based in Dharamshala in India.
- Lha Charitable Trust, Institute for Social Work and Education, based in Dharamshala in India.
- National Democratic Party of Tibet, based in Dharamshala in India.
- Norbulingka Institute
- Offices of Tibet, official agencies of the 14th Dalai Lama and the Central Tibetan Administration based in Dharamsala, India.
- Political Prisoners Movement of Tibet, based in Oakland, California, USA
- Tibetan Centre for Human Rights and Democracy
- Tibetan Children's Villages, based in Dharamshala in India.
- Tibetan Institute of Performing Arts
- Tibet Justice Center, based in Dharamshala in India.
- Tibet Religious Foundation of His Holiness the Dalai Lama
- Tibetan National Football Association
- Tibetan Nuns Project, based in Seattle, USA and Dharamshala, India.
- Tibetan Volunteers for Animals, based near Camp 2, Lake Bylakuppe Tibetan Settlement Mysore, India.
- Tibetan Women's Association, based in Dharamshala in India.
- Tibetan Youth Congress, based in Dharamsala, India.
- Tibet Bureau in Geneva is the official representation of the 14th Dalai Lama and the Tibetan Government in Exile for Central and Eastern Europe.
- Tibet Bureau (Paris)
- Tibetan Centre for Human Rights and Democracy
- Tibetan Children's Villages, based in Dharamshala in India.
- Tibet Fund, the primary funding organisation for the health, education, refugee rehabilitation, cultural preservation and economic development programs that enable Tibetans in exile and in their homeland to sustain their language, culture and national identity, based in New York City, NY, United States.
- Tibet Justice Center, based in Dharamshala in India.
- Tibet Religious Foundation of His Holiness the Dalai Lama

== Organisations linked to Tibetans in exile ==
- Australia Tibet Council
- Buddhist Digital Resource Center, formerly Tibetan Buddhist Resource Center. In cooperation with the Harvard University Open Access Project (HOAP), BDRC is making its entire library completely open access. It also coordinates internships with graduate students from Harvard Divinity School and the Department of South Asian Studies at Harvard.
- Drepung Loseling
- Free Tibet Campaign in London
- Foundation for the Preservation of the Mahayana Tradition
- Himalayan Art Resources
- International Campaign for Tibet
- Jewel Heart
- Journal of the International Association of Tibetan Studies
- Kopan Monastery
- Mind and Life Institute
- Nalanda Institute
- Rato Dratsang Foundation
- Rubin Museum of Art
- Social, Emotional, and Ethical Learning — SEE Learning
- Students for a Free Tibet
- Tibetan and Himalayan Library
- Tibet Center
- Tibet House worldwide
- Tibet House US
- Tibet Fund
- Trace Foundation
