= Chungdak Koren =

Tibetan nurse and politician (1950–2024)

- ཆུང་བདག་ཀོ་རེན
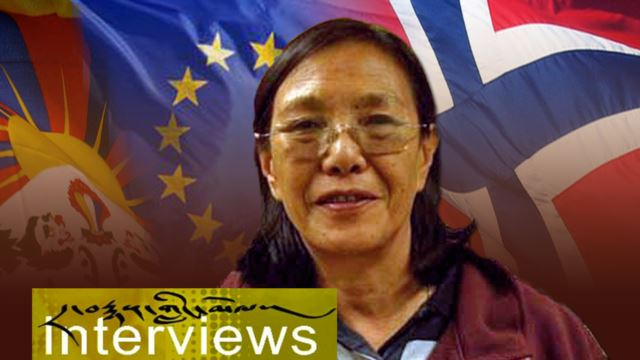
- Koren in 2012

Member of the Parliament of the Central Tibetan Administration
- In office 2011 – 6 May 2014
- Succeeded by: Wangpo Tethong

Representative of the Tibet Bureau in Geneva
- In office 5 September 1995 – 15 September 2001
- Preceded by: Gyaltsen Gyaltag
- Succeeded by: Chhime Rigzing

Personal details
- Born: 12 April 1950 Phari, Tibet
- Died: 10 September 2024 (aged 74) Oslo, Norway
- Education: University of Oslo
- Occupation: Nurse

Chungdak Koren (Standard Tibetan: ཆུང་བདག་ཀོ་རེན; 12 April 1950 – 10 September 2024) was a Tibetan nurse and politician.

== Biography ==
Born in Phari on 12 April 1950, Koren studied at the St. Joseph's Convent School in Kalimpong and at another school in Dehradun. From 1967 to 1968, she volunteered at the Tibetan Transit School. From 1968 to 1969, she worked as a manager at the Tibetan Refugee Cooperative Society in Sonada. She moved to Norway in 1969 on a scholarship to study at university in a three-year nursing training program. She worked as a nurse for 19 years at the Oslo University Hospital. She was a co-founder of the Norwegian Committee for Tibet when it was established in 1988. In 1989, she was formally appointed by the Offices of Tibet in London for coordination with the Nobel Prize Committee to prepare for the awarding of the Nobel Peace Prize for the 14th Dalai Lama. She was then a founding member the Voice of Tibet radio in Norway and continued to serve on its board of directors.

From 5 September 1995 to 15 September 2001, Koren was named representative of the Tibet Bureau in Geneva for the Dalai Lama. In this role, she assisted in the organization for the meeting between the Dalai Lama and Prime Minister of Italy Massimo D'Alema in 1999 and with the Minister of Internal Affairs of Switzerland Ruth Dreifuss in 2001. She also assisted in organizing a Luciano Pavarotti concert with UNESCO to finance education for Tibetan children. In total, the event raised over US$1 million for the cause.

In 2002, Koren organized a Kalachakra in Austria. The following year, she appeared in the documentary Wheel of Time to discuss the Kalachakra. In 2002, she joined the Norwegian Committee for Tibet and a member of the International Campaign for Tibet. In November 2008, she was awarded the Ossietzky Award by the Norwegian chapter of PEN International for her dedication to human rights in Tibet. In 2011, she was elected to the Parliament of the Central Tibetan Administration. She was replaced by Wangpo Tethong on 6 May 2014 for health reasons. Following a stroke, she recovered and continued her work for the Tibetan cause. Throughout her career, she was never granted a visa to return to Tibet.

Koren died in Oslo on 10 September 2024, at the age of 74.
