= Australia Tibet Council =

Australian independent nonprofit organisation

The Australia Tibet Council (ATC) is an Australian independent nonprofit organisation working to promote the human rights and democratic freedoms of the Tibetan people. ATC is funded solely by members and supporters. The organisation's headquarters are in Sydney.

The council undertakes a range of campaigns and advocacy work including promoting support for negotiations between the Dalai Lama and the Chinese government to reach a resolution to the Tibet situation; promotion of religious and cultural freedom and human rights, particularly in the case of Tibetan political prisoners; and the protection of the Tibetan environment and the prevention of the inappropriate exploitation of Tibetan resources.

A particular focus of the ATC is lobbying the Australian Government with regard to opening up dialog with China about the situation in Tibet.

Following public campaigns led by the ATC, the former Australian Prime Minister, John Howard, has met the Tibetan leader twice, in 1996 and 2007. The ATC has lobbied political leaders on both sides of Australian politics to support greater autonomy for Tibet.

The ATC states that it works to achieve the United Nations resolution 1723 of 1961 calling for "the cessation of practices which deprive the Tibetan people of their fundamental human rights and freedoms, including their right to self-determination". It claims to do this by raising awareness of the situation in Tibet at all levels of Australian society, by encouraging government and community leaders to take positive action, and by supporting appropriate Australian and international initiatives.

ATC liaises with the Tibetan Government-in-Exile located in Dharamsala, and is a member of the International Tibet Support Network, a global network of Tibet support groups.

== See also ==
- List of organizations of Tibetans in exile
