= Little Tibet =

Little Tibet may refer to:

- Ladakh, a union territory in Northern India
- Baltistan, a region in Northern Pakistan
- Little Tibet, Toronto, an ethnic enclave in the Parkdale area of Toronto, Ontario, Canada known for a large number of Tibetan emigres
