= World Tibet News =

- Available in: English, French
- Creator: Thubten Samdup
- Website: www.tibet.ca
- Commercial: No
- Launched: November 28, 1992; 33 years ago

World Tibet News (WTN), as well as World Tibet Network News, is a website created in 1992 by Thubten Samdup and the NGO Canada Tibet Committee. This site publishes daily information about Tibet and Tibetans in exile in English and French.

== History ==
The Tibetan community in Canada initially supported Tibetans in India, Nepal, and Tibet through the Canada Tibet Committee, an association founded in 1987. Through this association, which he co-founded, Thubten Samdup and three other editors created an information website in 1992 to connect Tibetans and Tibet support groups in Canada.

Its aim was then to educate the Canadian public on issues concerning Tibet as well as practitioners of Tibetan Buddhism, both the converts and those who immigrated to Canada from Tibet and India, to provide them with information and prompt them to develop social networks in their communities.

This site, initially called CanTibNet (CTN), was used and valued by many Tibetans and friends of Tibet outside Canada. Therefore, it was renamed World Tibet Network.

The site, based in Montreal, offers free announcements and regularly publishes its newsletter on Tibetan issues extracted from global sources, among which the research and news organization about Tibet, Tibet Information Network, as well as press releases, for "urgent action alerts" and information from non-governmental and governmental organizations such as the Central Tibetan Administration and various support groups for Tibet. WTN has played an important role in several campaigns, including the release of Gendun Rinchen, opposition campaigns to the Beijing Olympics bid and to the renewal Most favoured nation status of China by President Bill Clinton. In 1999, the service reached more than 40 countries. Its archives, dating back 1992, have 8000 articles. Three of the five publishers are Tibetans.

WTN remains active and informs Tibetans and their friends worldwide about Tibet and Tibetans in exile.
