= WTN =

WTN may refer to:

- W Network, a Canadian cable channel from 1995 to about 2001
- Whitton railway station, London, National Rail station code
- World Tibet News, created in 1992
- Worldwide TV News, which in 1998 merged into Associated Press Television News
- WWTN, an FM radio station in Nashville, Tennessee, USA, known as "99.7 WTN"
- Williston, North Dakota (Amtrak station code: WTN)
- RAF Waddington, England (IATA airport code: WTN)
