= Bogside Artists =

Mural painters from Derry, Northern Ireland

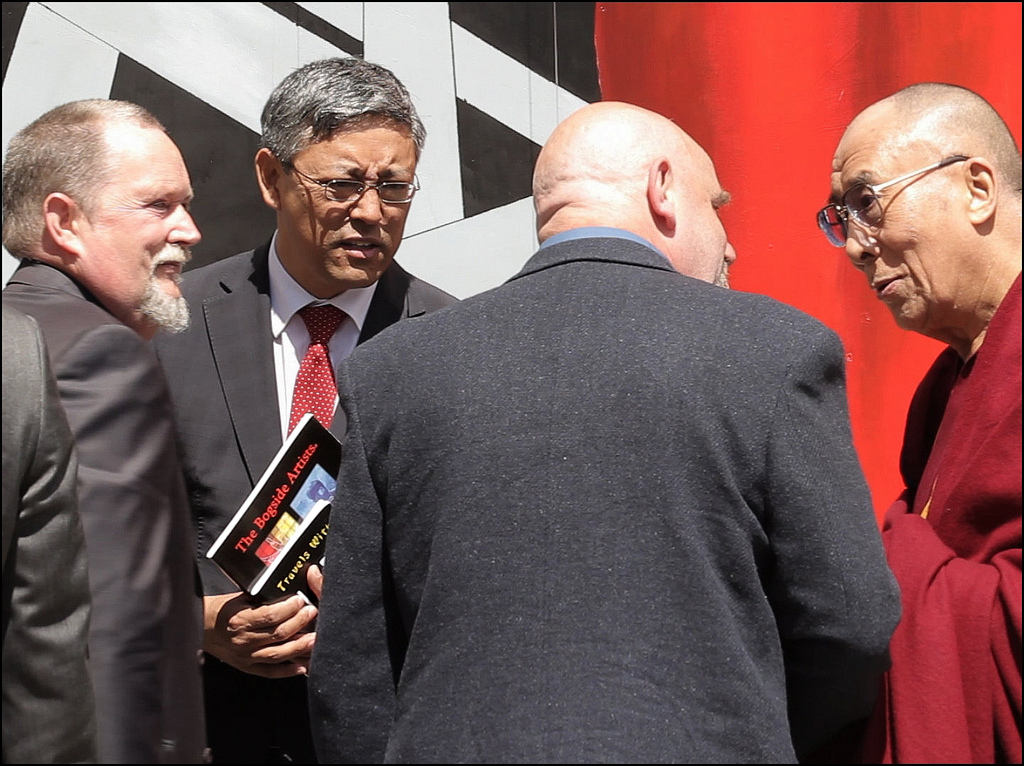
The 14th Dalai Lama with Tseten Samdup Chhoekyapa and 2 of the Bogside Artists in Maribor Slovenia at the unveiling of their mural painting in May 2012

The Bogside Artists are mural painters from Derry, Northern Ireland, consisting of the brothers Tom and William Kelly (died January 2017), and Kevin Hasson (b. 8 January 1958). Their most famous work, a series of outdoor murals called the People's Gallery, is located in the Bogside neighbourhood of Derry and depicts the events surrounding sectarian violence and civil rights protests in Northern Ireland during the Troubles.

== Career ==
The Bogside Artists first began working together in 1993 to document the events surrounding the Northern Ireland Troubles. With supplies donated from local residents, they painted several murals on the walls of buildings in Rossville Street, commemorating the Northern Ireland civil rights movement, the Battle of the Bogside, and Bloody Sunday in which British Army paratroopers opened fire on marches; 13 civilians were killed on the day and one subsequently.

From 1994 to 2008, they painted a total of twelve murals in the Bogside, which they collectively named The People's Gallery. The People's Gallery spans the entire length of Rossville Street, which runs through the centre of the Bogside. It is a unique visual display – an entire street devoted to the history of over three decades of political conflict in the province as it affected the city. It occupies no fewer than four pages in the Lonely Planet guide (2012). The gallery has never been promoted either by the local council or by any other body including the tour bodies or arts bodies, many of which are run by Sinn Féin. The gallery was officially inaugurated in August 2007 and an additional mural dedicated to Nobel Peace Prize Laureate and retired leader of the Social Democratic and Labour Party, John Hume, was completed in 2008.

The Bogside Artists have exhibited their work widely in various cities, including Boston, Sydney, Brisbane, Chicago, London and Washington, D.C. They have painted a number of other works, most notably a mural of Martin Luther King Jr. in Washington D.C. In September 2011 they painted a mural for the town of Vordernberg Austria on the controversial theme of the New World Order. More recently they completed a mural for Europe's City of Culture Maribor, Slovenia that was unveiled by the Dalai Lama. They see their work as humanitarian and human as "men speaking to men" (Tom Kelly, spokesman) and have little time or interest in contemporary art. "All real art is contemporary as it has its origins in the truthful state of mind which is timeless". On their website one will find their manifesto.

== Art and peacebuilding ==
The Bogside Artists design the murals of The People’s Gallery are not as "political propaganda, declarations of identity, or territorial markers." The murals of the Bogside Artists are supposed to make its audiences "think about the past and process painful memories" and "enable and facilitate cross-community conversation around shared experiences seen from different perspectives and contexts." They hope that this will foster mutual understanding, reconciliation and the building of peace.

In addition to their work as muralists, the Bogside Artists also conducted numerous art workshops throughout the years with local Catholic and Protestant children to promote cross-community understanding.

They were also featured in many documentaries What You See Is What You Get and Window on the West, etc.

== Controversy ==
In November 2005, Walter Momper, president of the Berlin State Parliament, cancelled a planned exhibition of the Bogside murals in the parliament building. He criticised the artists for their "partiality" in only representing one side of the conflicts in Northern Ireland. The artists stated that the murals are intended to be "a human document" rather than a political or sectarian statement.

== Mural gallery ==
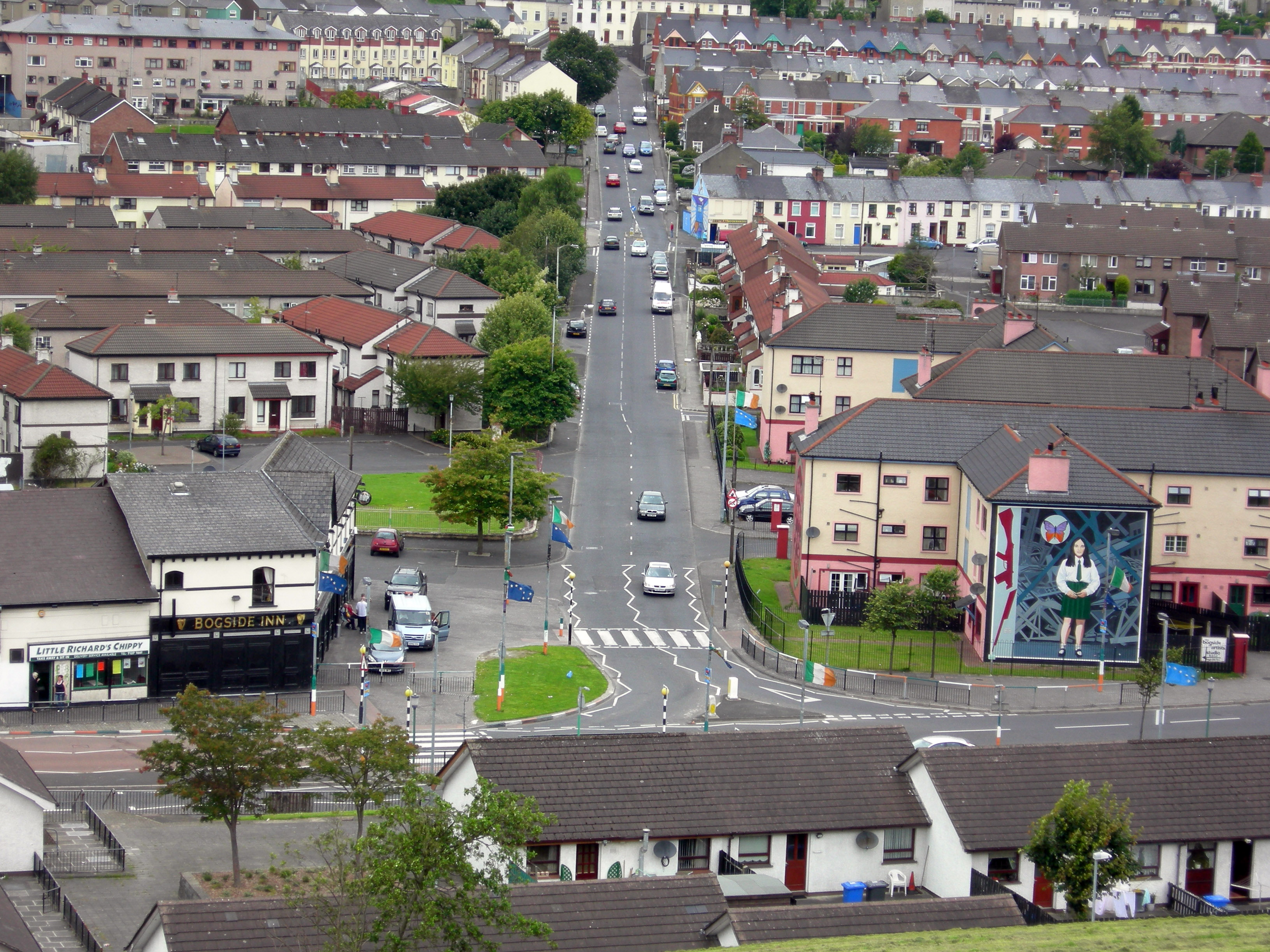
Westland Road in the Bogside, viewed from the city wall (31 July 2007)

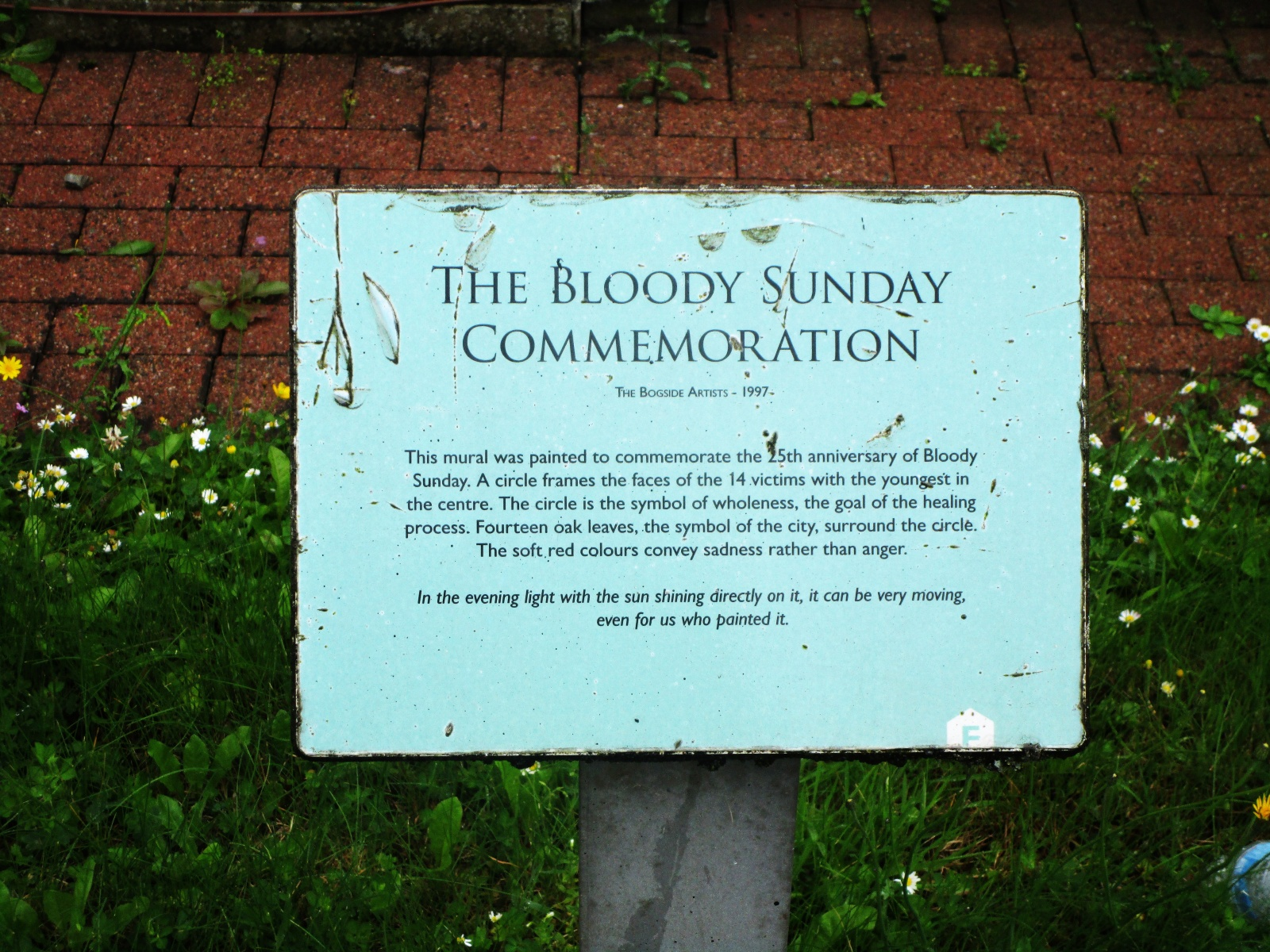
The artists comment their mural The Bloody Sunday Commemoration

== See also ==
- List of Northern Irish artists
- Northern Irish murals
