= Kelsang Gyaltsen Bawa =

Tibetan politician (born 1966)

- བསྐལ་བཟང་རྒྱལ་མཚན་འབའ་བ
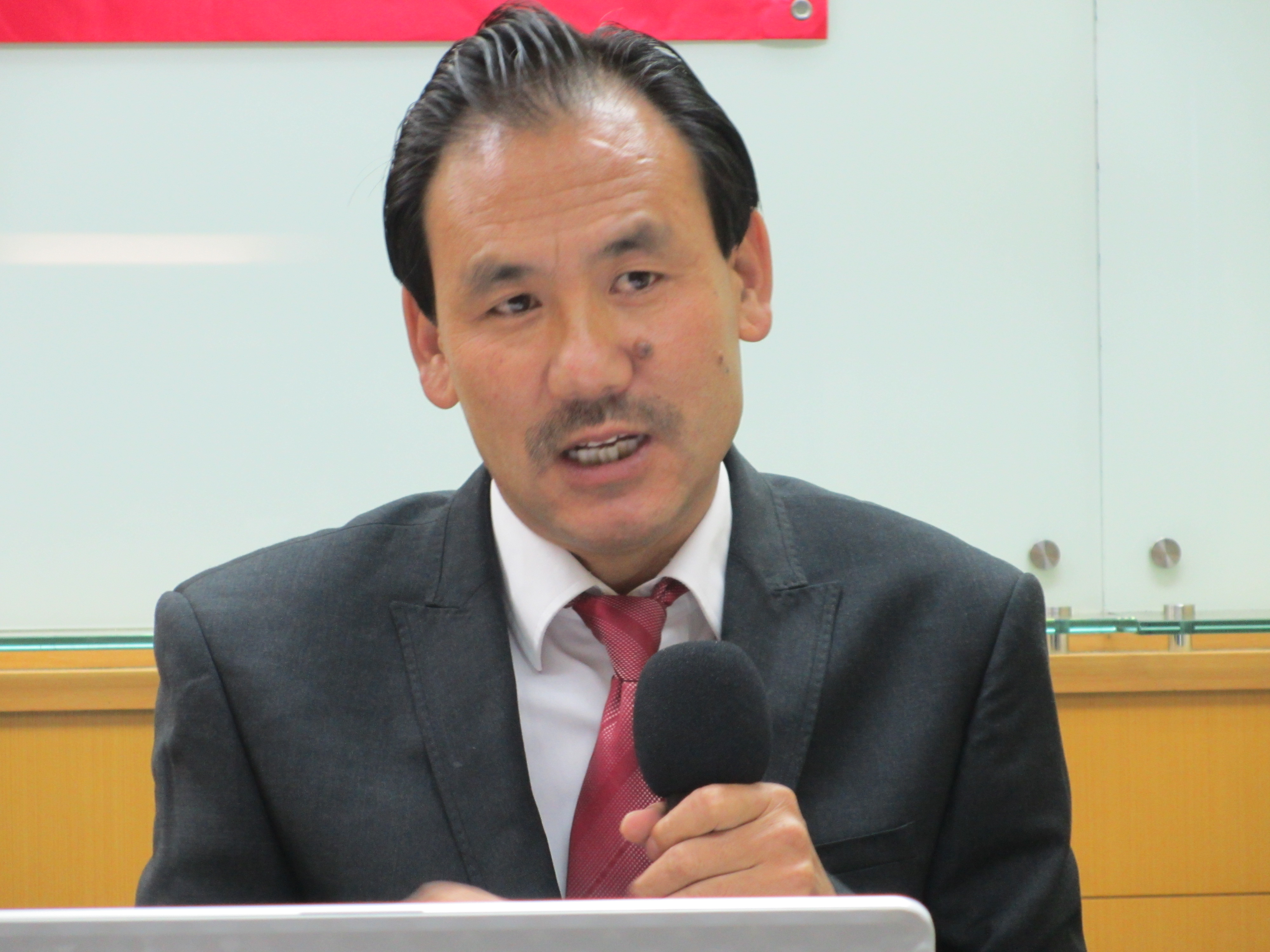
- Born: 1966 (age 59–60); Batang County, Garzê Tibetan Autonomous Prefecture, Sichuan, China
- Occupation: Politician

Kelsang Gyaltsen Bawa (born 1966) is a Tibetan politician. He is the representative of the Tibet Office in Taiwan.

== Early life ==
Gyaltsen was born on 1966 in Batang County in Garzê Tibetan Autonomous Prefecture, Sichuan.

== Political career ==
After learning Chinese and Tibetan languages, he worked in the Political Consultative Committee and the United Front Work Department of the Chinese Communist Party in Garzê for more than twelve years, accumulating unique political experiences during his tenure. During this time, he also undertook written and oral translations in all the meetings held by the Political Consultative Committee and the Buddhist Affairs United Committee.

He fled China for India in June 1999 and joined the Tibetan government in exile. On September 1, 1999, he joined the Tibetan Research and Analysis Center of the Central Tibetan Administration in Dharamsala. There, he undertook research on the Tibetan province of Kham, China and Taiwan. He has written or translated from Chinese into Tibetan and vice versa of a number of important articles and books related to the Tibetan issue, the history of Tibet and other related subjects. He is a co-founder of the Khawa Karpo-Tibet Culture Centre in Dharamshala, and was actively involved in publishing the Bod-kyi Bang-chen newspaper and other publications.

At the 2006 and 2011 Tibetan legislative elections, Bawa was elected a deputy in the Parliament of the Central Tibetan Administration representing Kham. In 2016, he was appointed as the Tibetan government in exile's representative to Australia. On January 4, 2021, he was assigned as the de facto representative of the Tibet Religious Foundation of His Holiness the Dalai Lama in Taiwan for a four-year term, succeeding Dawa Tsering.

In 2022, Bawa met with Speaker of the United States House of Representatives Nancy Pelosi on her visit to Taiwan.
