= LHA =

LHA may refer to:

- Flughafen Lahr (IATA code)
- Lha (Cyrillic), a letter of Cyrillic alphabet
- Lha (Tibetan), one of the eight classes of gods and demons in Tibetan Buddhism
- LHA (file format), a freeware compression utility and associated file format
- LHA (for [Leading Helicopter Academies]), "Raising flying standards in Europe"
- A US Navy hull classification symbol: Landing helicopter assault (LHA)
- LHA, the local hour angle of an astronomical object
- Lha Charitable Trust, an Indian nonprofit organization primarily focused on Tibetian social work
- Lateral hypothalamic area, a part of the brain that has been implicated in the control of feeding behavior
- Lesbian Herstory Archives, a New York–based lesbian history archive and museum.
- Lincoln Highway Association
- Livonia Hockey Association, amateur hockey league in Livonia, Michigan
- Local Housing Allowance, welfare benefit in the UK to help tenants with low incomes pay their rent
- Stock ticker for Lufthansa on the Frankfurt Stock Exchange
- LaurenHill Academy, in Saint-Laurent, Montreal
