= Lhagyari Namgyal Dolkar =

Indian politician (born 1986)

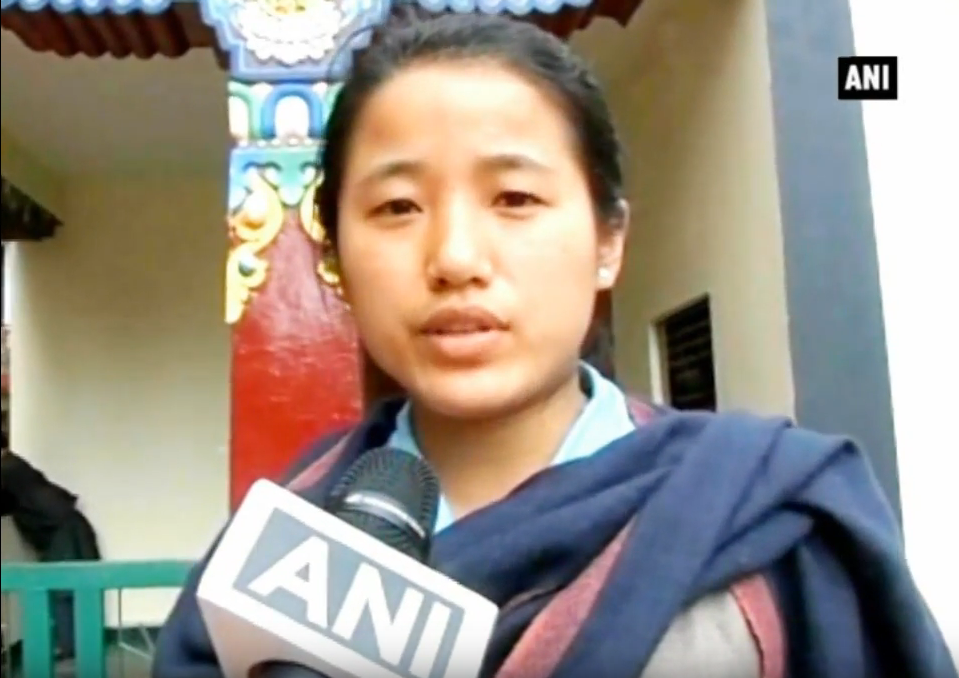
- Born: 13 April 1986 (age 40)

Lhagyari Namgyal Dolkar (Tibetan: ལྷ་རྒྱ་རི་རྣམ་རྒྱལ་སྒྲོལ་དཀར, born on 13 April 1986 in Dharamsala) is a Tibetan politician, Member of Parliament and President of the Association of Former Tibetan Political Prisoners Gu-Chu-Sum Tibet Movement.

== Biography ==
Lhagyari Namgyal Dolkar was born in 1989 in Dharamshala. She attended the School of Tibetan Children's Villages, and then obtained a master's degree in English literature.

In 2011, at the age of 25, she was the first Tibetan woman to obtain Indian nationality after the Delhi High Court ruled in her favour.

In 2012, it began the march for peace and freedom in Tibet, in solidarity with the Self-immolation of Tibetan sacrifices and the Political prisoners in Tibet.

She taught literature at DBS College (PG) until 2013, when she joined the Association of Tibetan Women in Exile as coordinator of the project "Legal Empowerment of Tibetan Women" for 8 months.

From 2013 to 2016, she was Vice-President of the Gu-Chu-Sum Association. In September 2016, she was elected president of this association.

In March 2016, Lhagyari Namgyal Dolkar was elected to the 16th Tibetan Legislative Assembly.
