= Thubten Samdup =

Tibetan artist, educator, activist, and politician

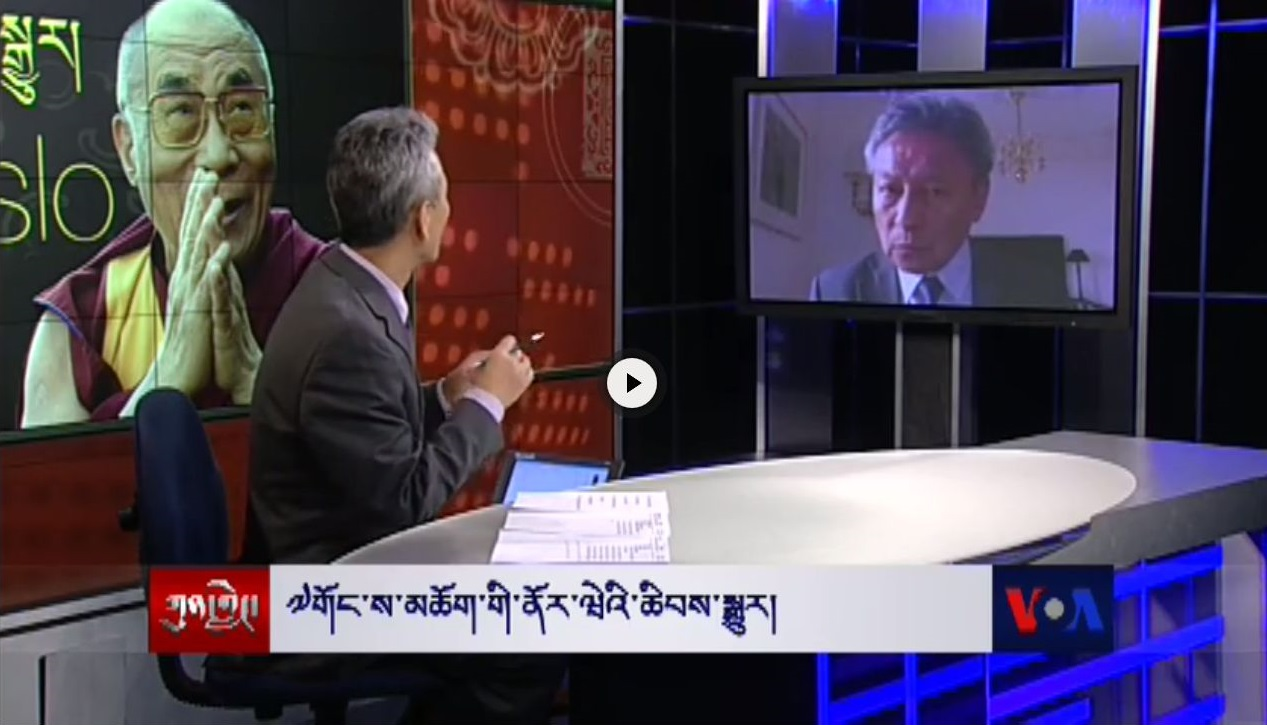
- Samdup with the 14th Dalai Lama
- Born: October 24, 1949 (age 77); Lhasa
- Citizenship: Canada
- Education: Brown University
- Occupations: Ethnomusicologue, activist, educator, and politician

Thubten "Sam" Samdup is a Tibetan ethnomusicologue, activist, artist, educator, and politician. He was the first elected member of the Parliament of the Central Tibetan Administration, representing North America. He founded and led the International Tibet Network, a coalition of over 100 Tibetan groups. In 2009, the 14th Dalai Lama appointed Samdup as his representative at the Office of Tibet in London, where he served until September 2014. In 1987, Samdup co-founded the Canada Tibet Committee. Along with Dicki Chhoyang, he was a key figure in the 1991 documentary A Song for Tibet.

== Early years ==
Samdup's parents came from Kham, his father was a merchant of tea, barley, and wool, and his mother was a farmer. During the 1959 Tibetan uprising, he went into exile in India with his parents and younger brother, and the family settled in Kalimpong. Later, he was placed in a reception center for Tibetan refugee children, run by Tibetan Government in Exile, known as Bhuso Khang in Dharamshala. He later enrolled in the Tibetan Institute of Performing Arts, where he studied traditional Tibetan music and dance. He received the John D. Rockefeller III Fund Scholarship, under which he studied ethnomusicology at Brown University in Rhode Island.

== See also ==
- Dalai Lama
- 14th Dalai Lama
- International Tibet Network
- Tibetan independence movement
- Central Tibetan Administration
- History of Tibet (1950–present)
