= Wangpo Tethong =

Owner and MD of Tethong Kommunikation

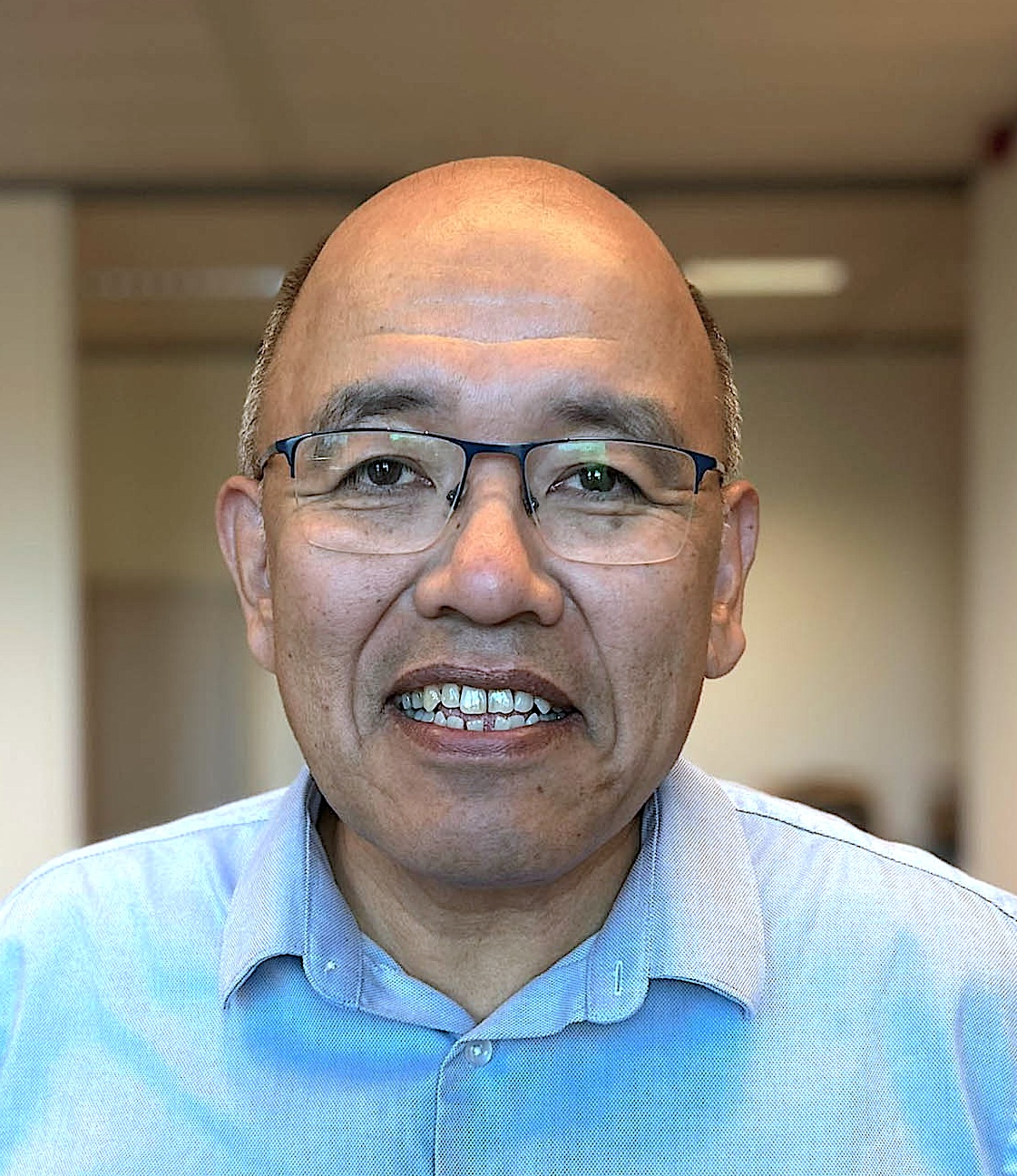
- Tethong in 2025
- Born: 16 April 1963 (age 63); Trogen, Canton of Appenzell Ausserrhoden, Switzerland
- Education: University of Zürich
- Occupations: communications consultant, historian, spokesperson, writer, politician
- Years active: since 1988
- Known for: Member of the 15th Tibetan Parliament in Exile

Wangpo Tethong (born 16 April 1963, Trogen, Canton of Appenzell Ausserrhoden) is the Executive Director of International Campaign for Tibet Europe. He is a former party secretary of the Green Party Canton of Zurich, spokesperson of Greenpeace Switzerland and worked as a senior consultant for a Swiss consultancy company. He is also known as a Swiss–Tibetan activist, writer and member of the 15th Tibetan Parliament in Exile.

== Life and work ==
Wangpo Tethong was born to Tibetan refugees at the Kinderdorf Pestalozzi in Trogen, Canton of Appenzell Ausserrhoden. He studied history and law at the University of Zürich, where he graduated with the master's degree (phil. I) from the philosophical department in 1997.

In 1988 Tethong assisted the German Die Grünen politicians Petra Kelly and Gert Bastian, convenors of the first international hearing on Tibet. From 1988 to 1989 Tethong was a board member of the Tibetan Youth Congress (TYC), and between 1986 and 1990 president of the Tibetan Youth Association Europe and board member of the Verein Tibeter Jugend in Europa (literally: Association of Tibetan Youth in Europe). He co-founded the Studentische Arbeitsgemeinschaft für Tibet (STAFT) at the University of Zürich in 1989, and was co-editor of the Tibetan-German magazine Bod Shon (Junges Tibet, literally "Young Tibet") from 1989 to 1995. Since 2001 he is the elected president of the Gesellschaft Schweizerisch-Tibetische Freundschaft (GSTF), literally Swiss-Tibetan Friendship Society. Wangpo also served as party secretary and spokesperson of the Green Party in the Canton of Zürich from 1997 to 1999. Tethong was also a co-initiator of the Tibetan Freedom Radio that broadcasts a Tibetan and Chinese radio service, co-founder of Lamtön, an advice center for Tibetan refugees in Switzerland in 2004, chairman of the ITSN Olympics Working Group from 2001 to 2008 and since 2008 president of the National Olympic Committee of Tibet. He also initiated ICT Deutschland in 2004, in 2008 Filming for Tibet and one year later Tibet Film Festival.

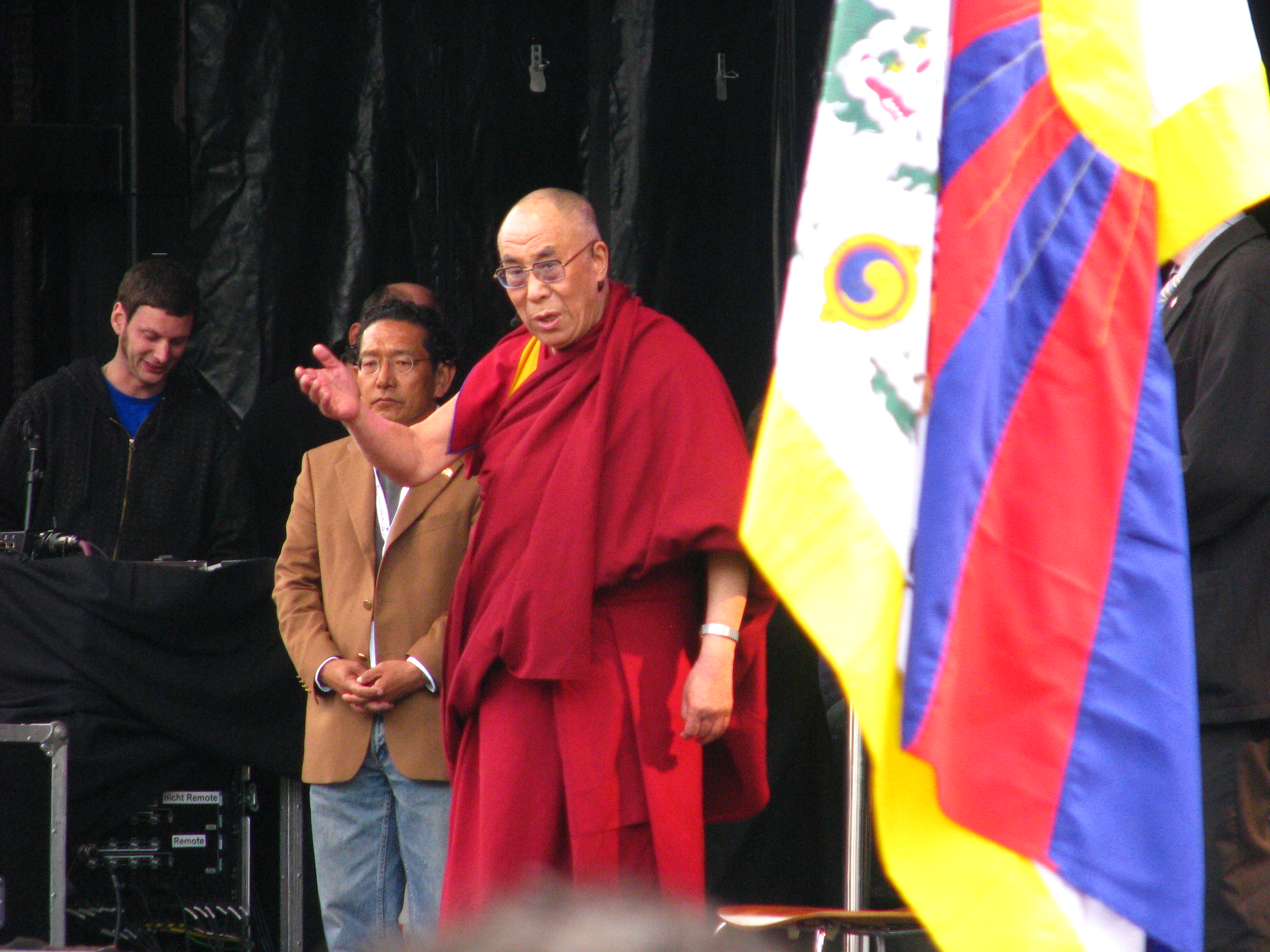
Solidarity event at Münsterhof in Zürich on occasion of a visit by HH 14th Dalai Lama in April 2010

As the first exile Tibetan, he carried out a daring protest at the Tiananmen Square in Beijing in 2006. Among other events, Tethong also organized the manifestations with HH 14th Dalai Lama in Berlin (Germany), Vienna (Austria) and Zürich (Switzerland). Since April 2000 Tethong is the media officer of Greenpeace Switzerland, since 2006 senior consultant for the Zürich-based Kampagnenforum, an agency for development and implementation of participatory communication campaigns. He works as freelancer, consultant for public affairs, and on communication and film production.

In 2025, he presented—together with the Library of Tibetan Works and Archives—the 17-volume collected edition of his father, Rakra Thupten Choedar Tethong, a well-known Tibetan educator, scholar, and writer.

== Tibetan Parliament in Exile ==
On 6 May 2014 Wangpo Tethong was elected as member of the Tibetan Parliament in Exile from Europe constituency, where he took the oath of office from speaker Penpa Tsering at a ceremony held at the Tibetan Parliament in Dharamshala. He replaced Chungdak Koren who submitted her resignation citing health reasons. Wangpo gained the third highest votes in the last parliamentary elections from Europe constituency, which is represented in the Tibetan Parliament by two members: he has been involved in various services to the Tibetan community including the campaign for jailed Tibetan filmmaker Dhondup Wangchen. The 44 members of the 15th Tibetan Parliament are present in the three traditional provinces, four Tibetan Buddhist sects and the traditional Bön religion of Tibet. Its members are directly elected by Tibetan exiles above the age of 18 from their respective countries around the world.

== Personal life ==
Wangpo Tethong is married, father of two children, and lives in Amsterdam, The Netherlands.

== Publications (selected works) ==
- 1995: University of Zürich, 1995–1996 thesis in history.
- 1997: Universität Zürich, with Prof. Dr. Jörg Fisch, 1985—1997 study in General History, Constitutional Law, Economic and Social History.
- 2000: Der Wandel in der politischen Elite der Tibeter im Exil: Integrations- & Desintegrationsprozesse in der politischen Elite, 1950 bis 1979. Tibet Institute Rikon, ISBN 978-3-72060-036-1.
- 2003: Between Cultures: Young Tibetans in Europe. Translated by Susanne Martin, in Exile as Challenge: The Tibetan Diaspora by Dagmar Bernstorff and Hubertus von Welck. Hyderabad Orient Longman, Delhi, ISBN.
- 2006: with Alexander Hauri: Überschwemmungen in der Schweiz. Klimawandel und seine Auswirkungen. Greenpeace Schweiz, Bern 2006.
- 2024: Tibet 2040: 4 Scenarios on the Future of Tibet, Dharamsala, Zurich, Washington DC, published by Future of Tibet
- 2025: Rock 'n Roll, a Glass of Beer, and the Idea of Freedom, in: The Dalai Lama & Havel - Warriors for Truth & Love, by Kateřina Jacques Bursíková, Kateřina Procházková et al., Prague, 2025, ISBN 978-80-88417-14-9
