= Tibetan Volunteers for Animals =

Environmental group active in India and Tibet

- Type: Non-profit
- Location: Near Camp 2 Lake Bylakuppe Tibetan Settlement Mysore District - Karnataka Sate INDIA
- Website: www.semchen.org

Tibetan Volunteers for Animals or TVA is an environmental group in parts of India and Tibet which aims to improve the quality and treatment of wild animals such as the yak in Tibet by encouraging local people to become vegetarian or to restrict their intake of meat.

The group has been involved in various information campaigns since 2000.

Some issues of TVA's magazine Semchen, in Tibetan and English, highlight the Buddha's teachings about living meat-free.

== See also ==
- List of organizations of Tibetans in exile
