= 100 Sunset =

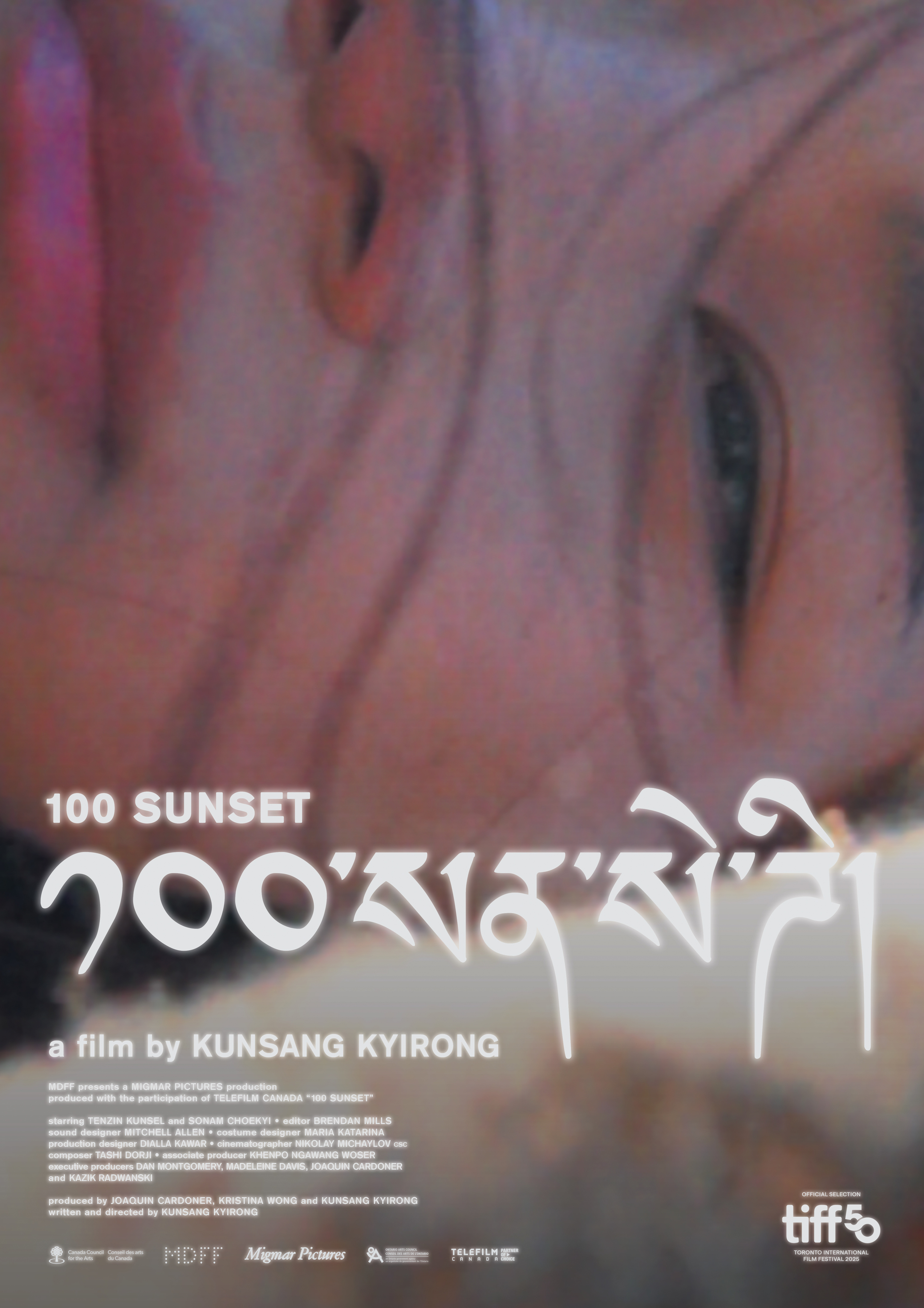
- Promotional poster
- Directed by: Kunsang Kyirong
- Screenplay by: Kunsang Kyirong
- Produced by: Joaquin Cardoner; Kristina Wong; Kunsang Kyirong
- Starring: Tenzin Kunsel; Sonam Choekyi; Tsering Bawa; Tsering Gyatso
- Cinematography: Nikolay Michaylov
- Edited by: Brendan Mills
- Music by: Tashi Dorji
- Production company: Migmar Pictures
- Distributed by: MDFF
- Release date: September 6, 2025 (TIFF)
- Running time: 99 minutes
- Country: Canada
- Languages: English; Tibetan

100 Sunset is a Canadian drama film, directed by Kunsang Kyirong, produced by Joaquin Cardoner, and released in 2025. Kyirong's directorial debut, the film stars Tenzin Kunsel as Kunsel, a young Tibetan Canadian woman living in the Parkdale neighbourhood of Toronto, who meets and befriends new immigrant Passang (Sonam Choekyi), with the two attempting to break out of the cultural expectations imposed on them in their community.

The cast also includes Tsering Bawa, Lobsang Tenzin, Tsering Gyatso, Tsering Dolma, Kelsang Dolma and Sherab Sangpo.

The film had its world premiere at the 2025 Toronto International Film Festival, and will screen at the 2025 Vancouver International Film Festival in October.

== Critical response ==
Pat Mullen of That Shelf wrote that the film was a spiritual sibling to the 2022 film Concrete Valley, writing that "Kyirong finds an evocative premise here, but the film’s meandering nature often leaves it adrift as it explores new pockets of the Canadian landscape, whether in concrete jungles or verdant forests. 100 Sunset nevertheless makes an earnest effort to represent a community authentically, which can be felt in the casting of many non-professionals and members of the community. The naturalism of the performances lends the film a down-to-earth restraint, if a somewhat muted emotional payoff."

Neesa McRae-McNicholls of Now wrote that "Kyirong proves herself an intriguing filmmaker with 100 Sunset, depicting a gravitation toward eclectic cinematography, slower pacing, fearless experimentation, elusive storytelling, and the unspoken. The camcorder, in all of its mysteriousness, evokes a sense of watching, longing, and the fragile threads that bind communities together. This slow burner, while atypical to some, offers a secret passageway into the lives and stories of communities untold."

== Awards ==
At TIFF, the film received an honorable mention for the Best Canadian Discovery award.

The film was longlisted for the 2025 Jean-Marc Vallée DGC Discovery Award.
