= A Song for Tibet =

- Directed by: Anne Henderson
- Written by: Erna Buffie; Anne Henderson
- Produced by: Abbey Jack Neidik; Anne Henderson; Ali Kazimi; Kent Martin
- Cinematography: Ali Kazimi; Pierre Landry; Lynda Pelley
- Edited by: Anne Henderson
- Music by: Neil Smolar
- Production companies: Arcady Films, DLI Productions and the National Film Board of Canada
- Release date: 1991
- Running time: 57 minutes
- Country: Canada
- Language: English

A Song for Tibet is a 1991 Canadian short documentary film about efforts of Tibetans in exile, led by the Dalai Lama, to free their homeland and preserve their heritage. Directed by Anne Henderson, and produced by Abbey Jack Neidik, Ali Kazimi and Kent Martin, A Song for Tibet received the Award for Best Short Documentary at the 13th Genie Awards as well as the People's Choice Award for Best Documentary Film at the Hawaii International Film Festival. The film was co-produced by Arcady Films, DLI Productions and the National Film Board of Canada. Ali Kazimi was director of photography.

The film focuses on two Tibetans in exile in Canada: Thubten Samdup, who escaped from Tibet after the 1959 uprising against the Chinese, who teaches traditional performing arts in Montreal and heads the Canada-Tibet Committee; and Dicki Chhoyang, born in a refugee camp in India, who knows Tibet only through stories recounted by her parents. The film follows Dicki and Samdup from Montreal to Dharamshala, India and also documents the Dalai Lama's first public appearance in Canada.
