= Dicki Chhoyang =

Tibetan politician

Dicki Chhoyan
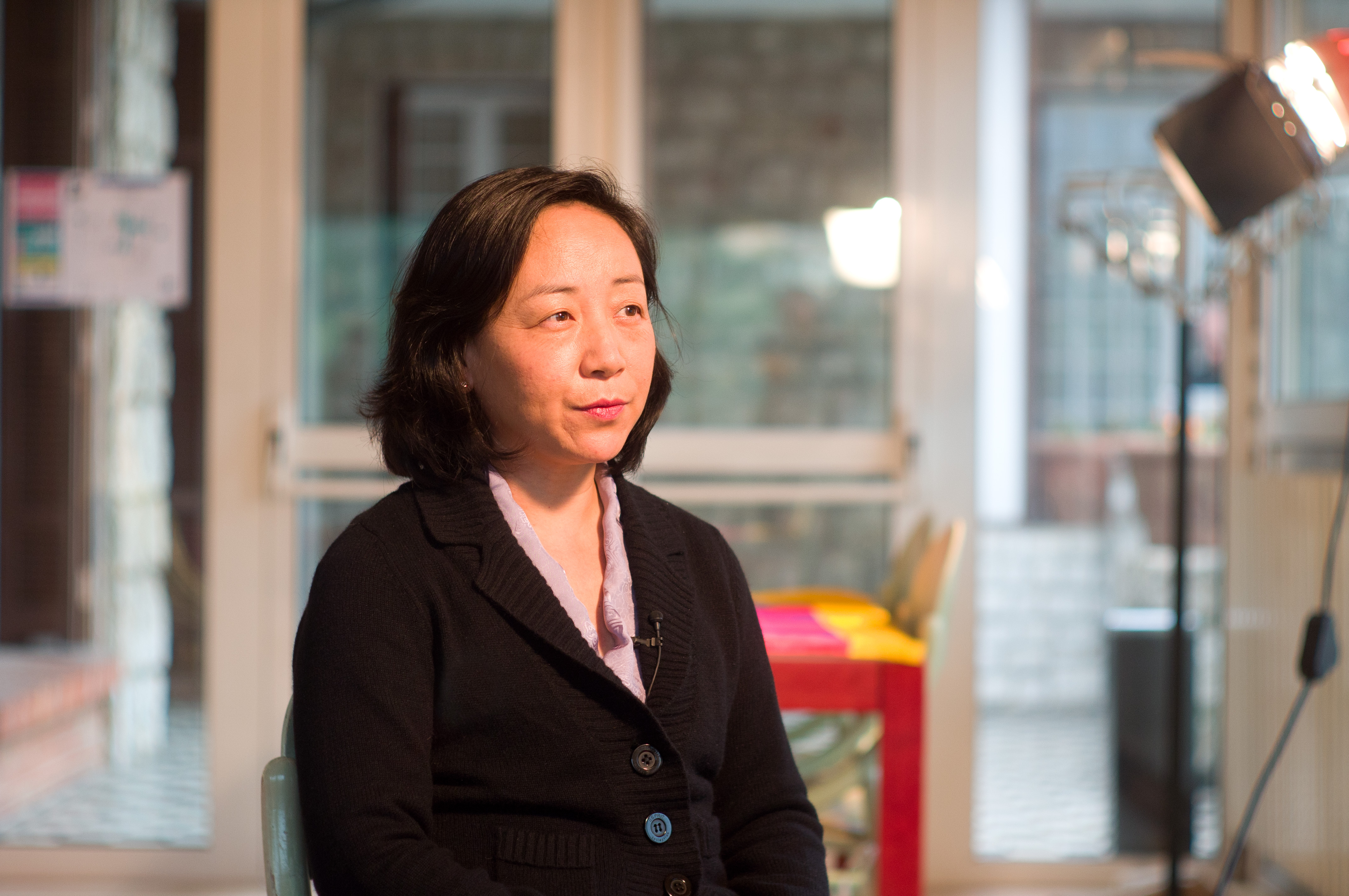
- Dicki Chhoyang, Nice, France, at a meeting of International Tibet Network, 4 November 2011

Foreign Minister of the Central Tibetan Administration
- In office 2011 – 28 February 2016
- Prime Minister: Lobsang Sangay
- Succeeded by: Lobsang Sangay

Personal details
- Born: Dickyi Choeyang; 1966 (age 59–60) Mussoorie, India
- Citizenship: Canada
- Education: Indiana University, University of Guelph
- Occupation: Politician

Dicki Chhoyang or Dickyi Choeyang (Tibetan: བདེ་སྐྱིད་ཆོས་དབྱིངས་, Wylie: bde-skyid chos-dbyings, Lhasa dialect: [tìcîː t͡ɕʰýjiŋ]) (born 1996 in Mussoorie) is a Tibetan politician who was the former Foreign Minister of the Central Tibetan Administration.

== Biography ==
Dicki Chhoyang was born in Mussoorie, India in 1966. She immigrated to Canada with her family at 4 years of age. She grew up in Montreal, Quebec in Canada and began working for the Tibetan community at a very young age. Around the age of 20 years, she worked in two key projects. On the one hand, she participated in the first Canadian documentary on Tibet called A Song for Tibet made by the National Film Board of Canada, and secondly to the US-Tibetan resettlement project in the United States. She was a local coordinator and helped 21 Tibetans relocate in Connecticut. At the age of 27, she studied and worked 10 years in Tibet and China. In December 1999, at Indiana University, MA, she got a degree in Central Eurasian studies. In 2006, she also obtained a M.Sc. from the University of Guelph.

Candidate for election in 2011, she was elected the Electorate of North America becoming Deputy of the 15th Assembly Tibetan Parliament in exile. In September 2011, she was replaced by Tashi Namgyal Khamsitsang when she was appointed Minister of Foreign Affairs of the 14th Tibetan Kashag. she resigned from her post on 28 February 2016.

In February 2020, she was appointed as the Interim Director for McGill University's Indigenous Initiatives.

== Publications ==
- Dicki Tsomo Chhoyang, Tibetan-medium higher education in Qinghai, Indiana University, 1999
- Dicki Tsomo Chhoyang, In Search of the Iron Rice Bowl: A Case Study of Tibetan Rural Household Investment in Higher Education as a Livelihood Strategy, University of Guelph, 2006

== See also ==
- List of foreign ministers in 2017
- Foreign relations of Tibet

Political offices
Preceded by	Foreign Minister of the Central Tibetan Administration; 2011-28 February 2016	Succeeded by Lobsang Sangay
