= Tibet Bureau (Paris) =

The Tibet Bureau in Paris, one of the offices of the official representation of the 14th Dalai Lama and of the Tibetan government in exile, is in charge of France, the Iberian Peninsula, the Maghreb and the Benelux countries (except Belgium). Founded in September 1992 it acts as an Embassy.

== Activities ==
The Bureau is responsible for the preparation of visits of the Dalai Lama and of officials of the government in exile to promote culture, religion and Tibetan language, to support the Tibetans living in Europe and Maghreb, and promote the cause of Tibet internationally.

Shortly after the founding of the Tibet Bureau in Paris in September 1992, François Mitterrand, then president of the French Republic, received the Dalai Lama in private at the Elysee on 16 November 1993.

Every year, the Tibet Bureau organizes the celebration of the birthday of the Dalai Lama.

Since 1996, the Tibet Bureau publishes Actualités Tibétaines, a quarterly magazine.

On 20 October 2003 the Dalai Lama was received at the Paris City Hall by Bertrand Delanoë, then mayor of Paris.

== List of representatives ==
- Dawa Thondup : September 1992 – 1997
- Kunzang Yuthok : February 1997 – 2001
- Tashi Phuntsok : September 2001 - November 2005
- Jampal Chosang : 27 February 2006 – 2009
- Tashi Wangdi : January 2009 -17 December 2010
- Ngodup Dorjee : 17 December 2010 -2014
- Tseten Samdup Chhoekyapa : 1 October 2014-2022
- Tashi Phuntsok : 2016-15 May 2022
- Rigzin Genkhang : Current Representative since 16 May 2022

== List of secretaries ==
In 1993, Wangpo Bashi joined the Tibet Bureau in Paris, and was appointed secretary of the Tibetan government in exile in 1995. He was replaced on 25 August 2011 by Tsering Dhondup.
