= Tibet Bureau (Geneva) =

The Tibet Bureau in Geneva is the official representation of the 14th Dalai Lama and the Tibetan Government in Exile for Central and Eastern Europe. It was established with approval of the Swiss Federal Government in 1964.

The Bureau is responsible for preparing the visits of the Dalai Lama and officials of the government-in-exile, supporting Tibetan culture, religion and language, supporting Tibetan citizens living in Europe, and promoting the cause of Tibet internationally.

The Bureau is headed by a Representative (Ambassador), who is assisted by an Under-Secretary.

== List of representatives ==
- Phala Thupten Woenden 1964–1973
- Nehnang Lopsang Choepel 1973–1976
- Sangling Tsering Dorjee 1976–1985
- Kelsang Gyaltsen 1 Sep 1985 – Feb 1992
- Gyaltsen Gyaltag Nov 1991 – Sep 1995
- Chungdak Koren 5 Sep 1995 – 15 Sep 2001
- Chhime Rigzing 27 Aug 2001 – 15 Sep 2005
- Kelsang Gyaltsen 1 Sep 2005 – 30 Mar 2008
- Tseten Samdup Chhoekyapa 1 April 2008 – 2014
- Ngodup Dorjee 1 Oct 2014 – 22 Jun 2022
- Chhime Rigzing 3 Mar 2019 – 30 Jun 2022
- Thinlay Chukki 1 Jul 2022 –
