= Tibetan Canadians =

Part of the Tibetan Diaspora

Total population
- 9,350

Regions with significant populations
- Toronto

Languages
- Tibetic languages, Canadian English, Canadian French

Religion
- Tibetan Buddhism, Bon

Related ethnic groups
- Tibetans, Tibetan Americans

Tibetan Canadians are Canadian citizens of Tibetan ancestry. Although Tibetan Canadians comprise a small portion of Asian Canadians, Canada holds one of the largest concentrations of Tibetans outside of Asia. Tibetans began immigrating to Canada as early as the early 1970s.

== Population ==
In 2021, the Tibetan population in Canada was recorded as being 9,350.

The majority of Tibetan-Canadians live in the Toronto metropolitan area. In 2016, there were 6,035 Tibetan-Canadians living in the Greater Toronto Area. There is a sizable Tibetan community with Tibetan businesses and restaurants, known as Little Tibet, in the Parkdale neighborhood in Toronto, in the area bound by Queen St. W. to the north, the Gardiner Expressway to the west and south, and Atlantic Ave. to the east. There is also a growing Tibetan community in South Etobicoke.

== Early Tibetan migration ==
Tibetans that have migrated to Canada and other countries have been subjected to a complex and violent history. In 1959, China occupied Tibet in the Annexation of Tibet by the People's Republic of China. Throughout the years, culture and religion took an impact from Chinese control which was expressed through the ruination of religious statues of Tibet and the destruction of buildings that represented the Tibetan culture

In 1959, around 87,000 were killed during Chinese rule. Tibetans that practiced their religion were killed. At least 80 000 Tibetans and the Dalai Lama left Tibet to Nepal but were denied access. Then they found refuge in India. India took them, however had difficulty to give imperative services and help needed to Tibetan refugees. However, there were more migration patterns towards India in the 1980s and 1990s.

During the United Nations Convention on the Status of Refugees in 1951, India did not sign this convention. This entailed that Tibetans living in India had little rights and hence tried to find another place for resettlement.

== Tibetan resettlement to Canada ==
In 1970 and 1971, 240 Tibetan refugees settled into Canada from India. The resettlement of Tibetan refugees was viewed by the Canadian government as a pilot project to evaluate what the country would do in the future regarding refugee aid. It was after a direct plea from the Dalai Lama to Prime Minister Lester B. Pearson in 1966 that launched Canada's slow process to bring 60 families into their country. The first Tibetans to arrive from the resettlement group were Tsering Dorjee Wangkhang and Jampa Dorjee Drongotsang when they landed in Toronto on October 15, 1970. The two settled in Batawa, Ontario where the first Tibetan community was planned to be located. Wangkhang and Drongotsang both started working at the Bata shoe factory. Factory owner Thomas Bata had gone to India, one of the countries where Tibetans were exiled, and took the initiative to employ three to four refugees in his company.

In 2007, a two-year immigration program to bring 2,000 Tibetan refugees to Canada was organized by Prime Minister Stephen Harper after a plea by the Dalai Lama. The first 21 Tibetans flew from India to Vancouver International Airport and were expected to settle into the Toronto, Ottawa, Vancouver and Sunshine Coast areas.

== New home in Canada and integration process ==
Canada originally declined Tibetan refugees to settle as a group, however this changed with consultations and national meeting with the Prime minister, Pierre Elliot Trudeau. This involved James George, one of the previous high commissioners to India. George's impact on Pierre Elliot Trudeau helped immigration officials to be more lenient with refuge policies for Tibetans.

In the 1960s, the Canadian government accepts Tibetan refugees under a few conditions. These conditions were set under the Tibetan Refugee program. This was an experimental program that would let 228 Tibetans enter Canada quickly and at a lower cost.

It took a decade for the first Tibetan migrants to set foot in Canada. The Canadian government officials did not want Tibetans to settle in a group but on individual basis and family basis. This means that only young families and single people coming as laborers were approved to seek refuge in Canada. Additionally, Canadian immigration officials were concerned about Tibetans nomadic lifestyles and establishing/settling themselves as a group. This would pose a challenge on the integration process. If group settlement had been approved, the integration process would have been much more difficult and permanency of integration would also be a challenge for newcomers and pose issues on the governmental level. Canadian immigration officials were worried that it would pose problems. Such problems were isolation and dependence within members of the same ethnic community. Additionally, learning one of the official languages of Canada was another problem that could arise and could affect integration directly (Logan & Murdie, 2014). Moreover, immigration officials chose younger Tibetan immigrants over older immigrant groups because integration would be easier regarding the process of learning one of the official languages. Therefore, finding a job and reaching out if one needs help or services would also be affected positively.

Tibetan immigrants were also selected from towns and villages because knowing their nomadic lifestyle, immigrant officials wanted Tibetans that had sedentary patterns. Tibetans also needed to have a certain level of high education.

Integration was facilitated through “group processing” which involves refugees and the state work together to aid resettlement into Canada.

== Parkdale, Toronto ==
The neighbourhood of Parkdale in Toronto contains the largest concentration of Tibetan immigrants and refugees in Canada. As of the 2006 Canadian Census, around 11% of Parkdale residents were of Tibetan ethnicity, comprising 1,985 persons (62% of Toronto's total Tibetan population and 42% of Tibetans in all of Canada). According to global population estimates, this makes the Parkdale Tibetan community the largest outside of Tibet and its surrounding area.

Most of the housing in the area consists of high-rise apartment buildings and single-family homes. Compared to much of the Toronto core, rent prices in Parkdale are affordable, and the area provides many amenities and services to recent immigrants and at-risk populations. Additionally, public transit offers accessibility to the city centre of Toronto.

=== Culture and community ===
Parkdale's existing Tibetan community and cultural institutions encourage the continued immigration of Tibetans to the neighbourhood, with 64% of Tibetan immigrants citing the existing presence of other Tibetans as a major factor in their decision to settle in the area. Little Tibet is centred around a series of blocks on Queen Street West, consisting of a number of Tibetan restaurants and shops with diverse influences from India, Nepal and China.

Films set within the Tibetan community of Parkdale include Tenzin (2021) and 100 Sunset (2025).

=== Family reunification concerns ===
Within Parkdale, a significant concern among Tibetan Canadian families is reunification with their relatives. Tibetans living in Canada that have already obtained permanent residency have found difficulty bringing their family members into Canada. Many of the relatives that have been unable to come to Canada live in Nepal and India. Citizenship and Immigration Canada (CIC) states that the Nepalese government is blocking Tibetan peoples that found refuge in Nepal after 1989 from exiting the country. India imposes that Tibetans must have a valid Identity Certificate to exit the country, and the process of obtaining this document can take several years.

== Notable Tibetan Canadians ==
- Bhutila Karpoche, member of the Legislative Assembly of Ontario and the first person of Tibetan descent ever elected to public office in North America
- Kunsang Kyirong, filmmaker
- Tsering Yangzom Lama, Giller Prize-nominated writer
- Tashi Rabgey, first Tibetan Rhodes Scholar and Research Professor of International Affairs at the Elliott School
- Lhadon Tethong, activist
- Rignam Wangkhang, CBC journalist
- Tsering Dorjee Wangkhang, one of the first two Tibetans to immigrate to Canada in 1970

== See also ==
- Tibetan Americans
- Tibet
- Tibetan people
- World Tibet News
- East Asian Canadians
