= Kunsang Kyirong =

Tibetan Canadian film director

Kunsang Kyirong is a Tibetan Canadian film director and screenwriter from Vancouver, British Columbia, whose feature-length film debut, 100 Sunset, premiered at the 2025 Toronto International Film Festival.

== Career ==
A graduate of Emily Carr University of Art and Design, she made her filmmaking debut with Yarlung in 2020. The film won the award for Best Student Animation at the Ottawa International Animation Festival in 2020.

Her 2022 short film Dhulpa received an honorable mention in the National Short Film Competition at the 2022 Festival du nouveau cinéma.

100 Sunset, Kyirong's feature-length film debut, premiered at the 2025 Toronto International Film Festival, where it received an honorable mention for the Best Canadian Discovery award.
