= Lha Charitable Trust =

Indian organization

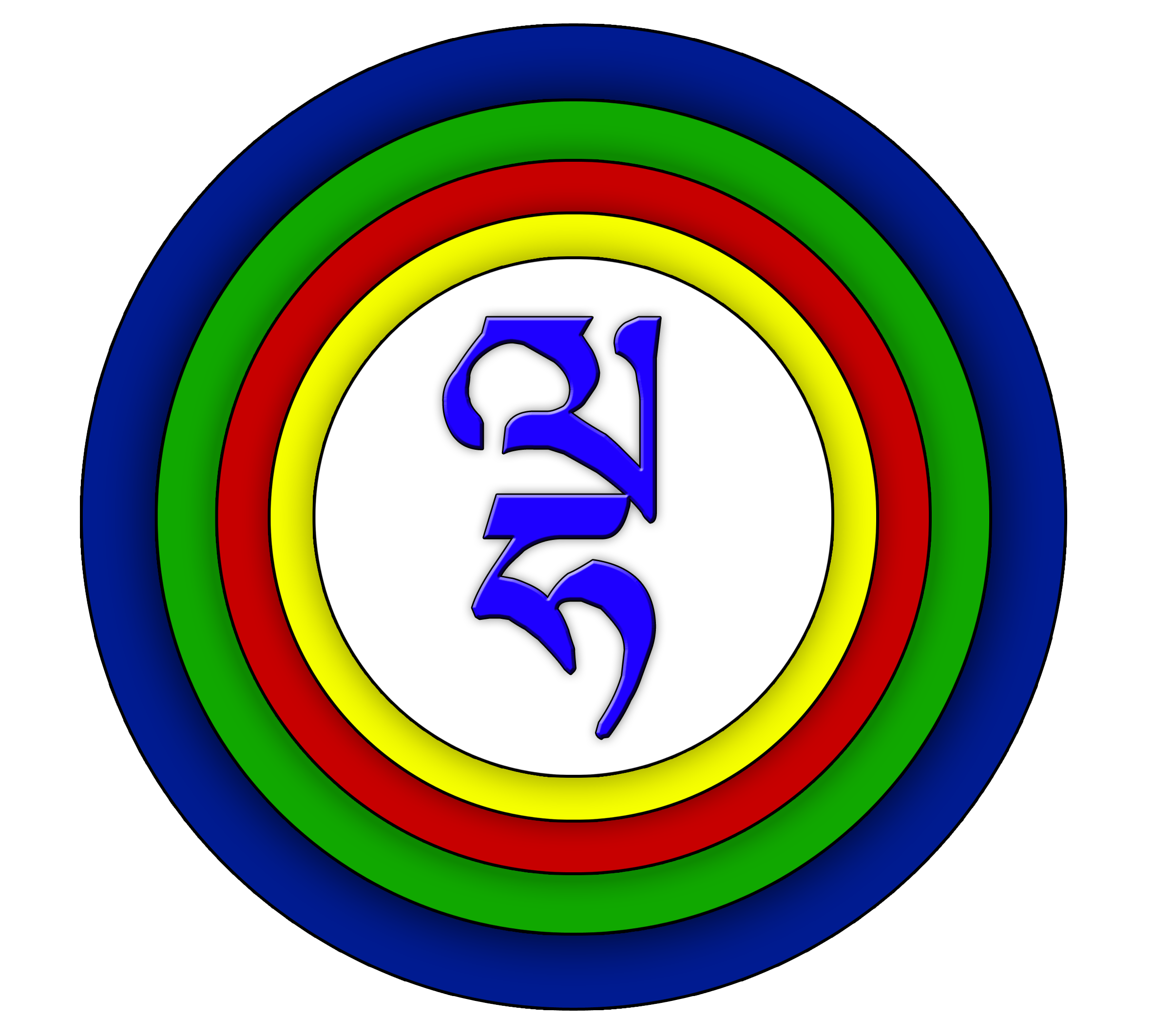
- Logo of Lha Charitable Trust
- Founded: 1997
- Founders: Jampa Tsering and Neil Guidry
- Type: 12AA & 80GNonprofit organization
- Purpose: Improve the well-being of Tibetan refugees through social work and education
- Location(s): Lha Office, Temple Road, McLeod Ganj – 176219; Dharamsala, District. Kangra; Himachal Pradesh, India
- Key people: Ngawang Rabgyal, Chairman & Director; Jampa Tsering, Co-Founder & Advisory Board Member; Neil Guidry, Co-Founder & Advisory Board Member; Tashi Dorjee, Laura Manley, Duthen Kyi; Advisory Board Member
- Employees: Permanent: 13; Part-time: 5 volunteers: 15-25
- Awards: In 2015 Lha was awarded first place in the category of "Best use of Website & Internet Tools" in the South Asia-wide 4th eNGO Challenge Award
- Website: https://www.lhasocialwork.org/

The Lha Charitable Trust is an Indian nonprofit organization primarily focused on Tibetian social work. It was founded in 1997 in Dharamshala, India by Jampa Tsering and Niel Guidry. The organization provides a variety of programs for Tibetan refugees and the local Himalayan community, including language classes, vocational training, and a community kitchen.

== Background ==
Since the annexation of Tibet by the People's Republic of China, Tibetans have been subject to the policies of the People's Republic of China, and the Chinese Communist Party. Under this regime, the Tibetan people's freedom of expression and political action has been suppressed. Consequently, over the past fifty years, thousands of Tibetans have chosen to leave their homeland in pursuit of the human rights that have been denied under Chinese rule. Every year, new refugees arrive in India after an arduous journey through the Himalayas, and countless refugees arrive with little or no education, speak only Tibetan, and possess no viable job skills to support themselves and their families. Furthermore, it is difficult for adult and elderly refugees to receive an adequate education in India due to the strict school system requirements, as educational policy prevents adults over the age of eighteen years from enrolling in school. Under such conditions, Lha plays a crucial role in facilitating the transition of Tibetan refugees from their homeland to the Indian community by providing long-term rehabilitation and educational resources for Tibetan adults.

== Mission and objectives ==
Lha Charitable Trust aims to be a resource of education and knowledge that provides meaningful, multi-level social and educational services for the benefit of others. The organization seeks to generate an atmosphere of harmony and cooperation within the community by addressing the needs of the impoverished and underprivileged. A key focus of Lha is to assist Tibetan refugees in adapting and thriving in their new home, while also preserving the unique Tibetan culture. Approximately 60 percent of Lha graduates work in the local community, 30 percent work abroad, and 10 percent return to Tibet. The Trust partners with several local and international organizations, such as the Tibetan Parent's Association, the Tibetan Women's Association, and the Leprosy Assistance Project—all of which regularly collaborate with the Trust to better meet the needs of the exiled community. The Trust's Outreach Program aids the wider Indian community through self-sustaining clean water projects, environmental initiatives, and donations of medicine, books, and clothing.

The Trust aims to "build a social service bridge for the Tibetan refugee community in northern India." Its primary objectives include:

1. Providing social services to Tibetan refugees and the local Himalayan population.
2. Offering Tibetan refugees education and health services, as well as the skills and assistance needed to build a new life in exile.
3. Facilitating mutual learning and cultural exchange experiences between Tibetans, volunteers, and other visitors.
4. Creating awareness of the Tibetan refugee situation and preserving the endangered Tibetan culture.

== Partnerships ==
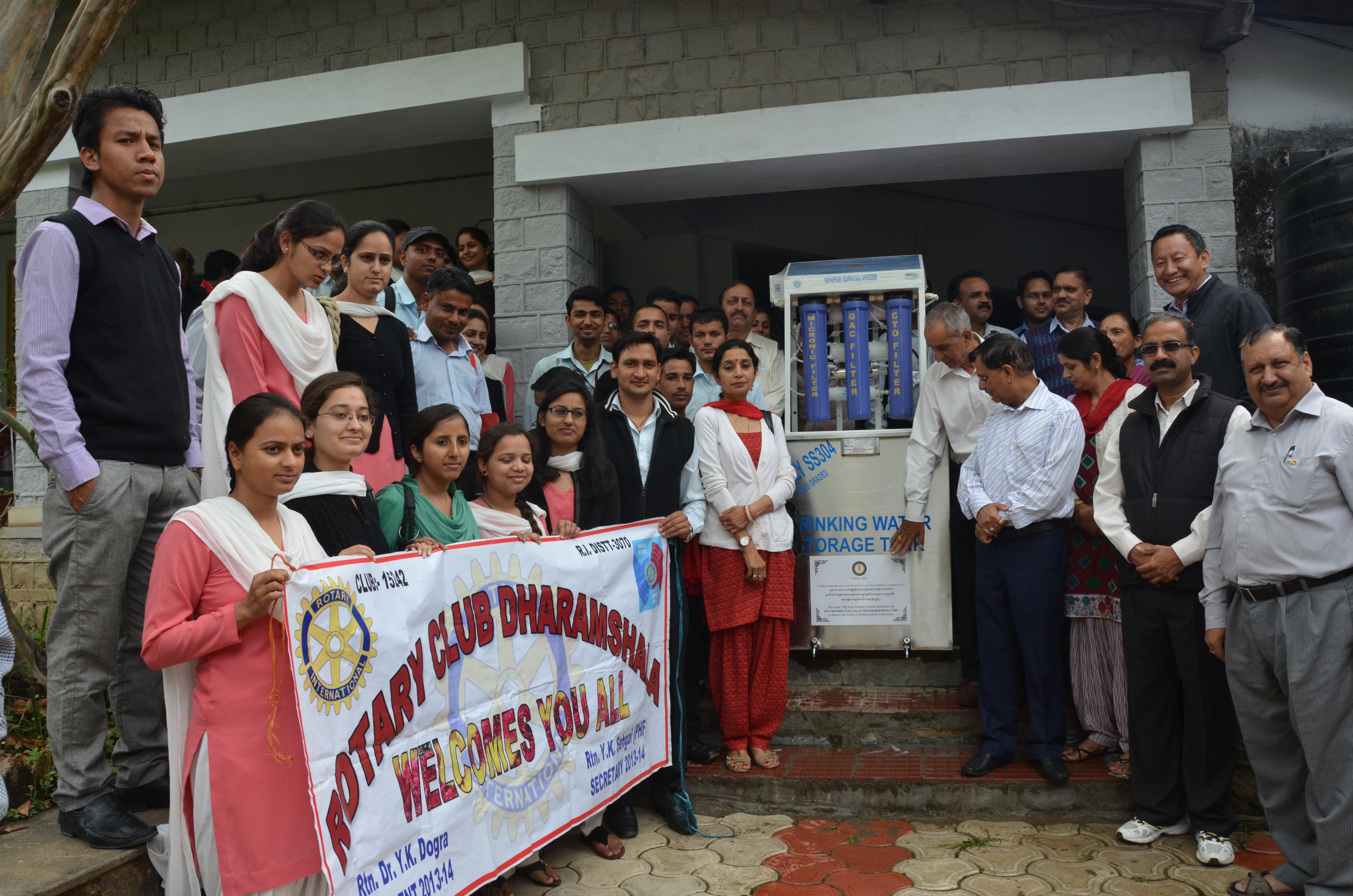
Lha and Rotary Club

Lha works in conjunction with various local and international organizations to build a strong network of affiliates, working towards the improvement of community and social services. International organizations include Louisiana Himalaya Association, Omprakash Foundation, Tulane University, Monterrey Institute of Technology and Higher Education, Loyola University, Centenary College, Lifeworks International, the Tibet Fund, the Tibetan Friendship Group Australia, Rustic Pathways, and the TibetFreunde Swiss. Local partners include the Central Tibet Administration, Dharamshala Rotary Club, and Delek Hospital, as well as many Tibetan NGOs.

== Programs ==
Lha provides a variety of programs for Tibetan refugees, and the local Himalayan community, such as language classes, cultural exchange programs, information technology (IT) classes, vocational training, health and environment education, clothes and medicine distribution, and a community kitchen. Lha serves an average of 250 people daily, hosts between fifteen and twenty-five volunteers, and provides up to nineteen programs and services.

=== Language classes ===
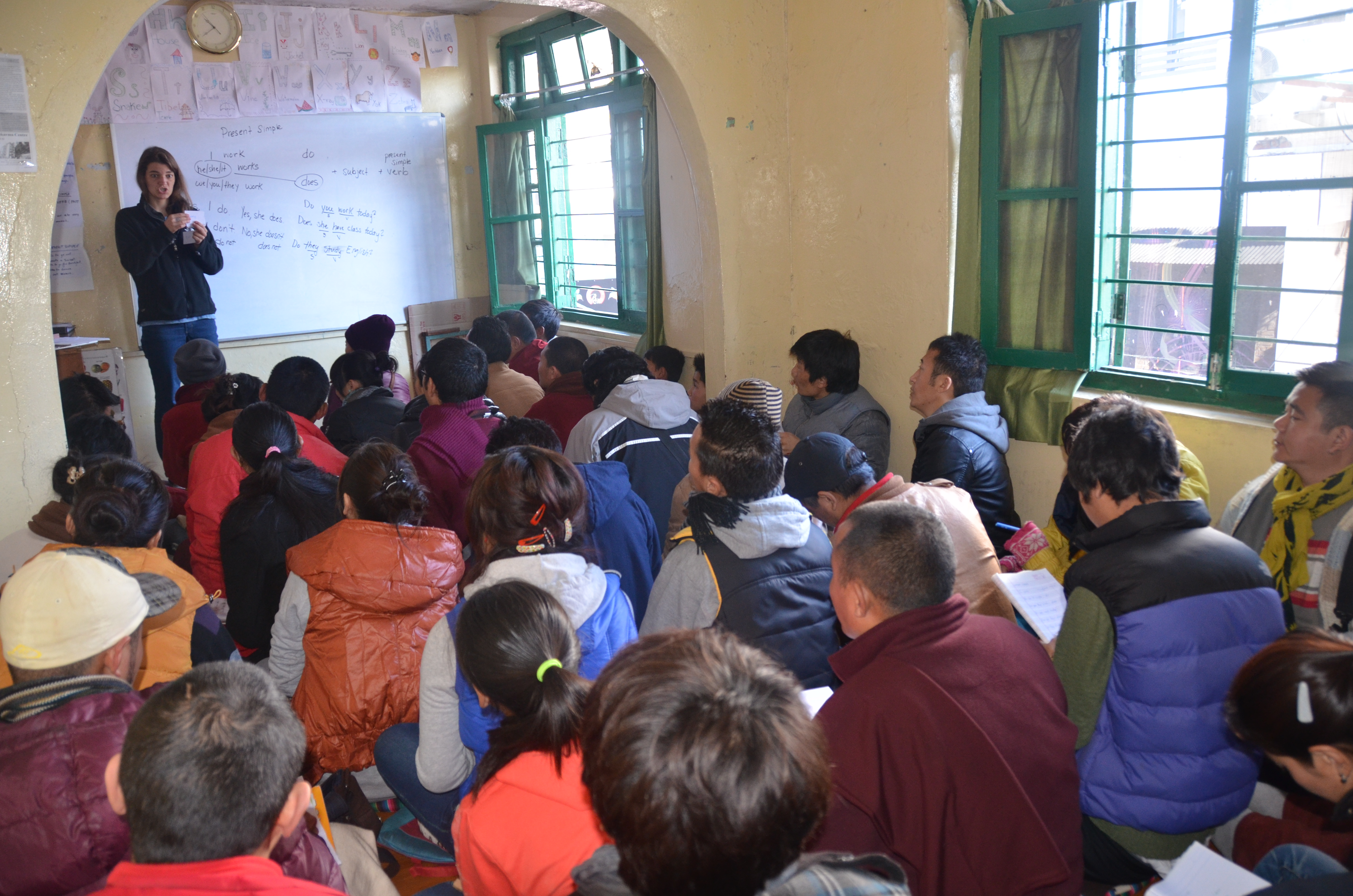
English Class at Lha

Language classes have taken place at Lha since 1999. Currently, 100 to 120 students participate in the language classes at Lha every month. Lha offers classes in English, French, Chinese, German and Tibetan daily, all at varying ability levels. In addition to traditional classroom sessions, Lha offers a daily English conversation class, for additional practice, with native English speakers; a tutoring program is also offered as a supplement for each language class. All courses are staffed by volunteer teachers and are open to the public.

In 2014 a new Lha English curriculum book was introduced for the Elementary, Beginner, and Intermediate level English classes based on the Standard English curriculum of the Common European Framework for Reference (CEFR). 2,678 students attended language classes in 2014, including 796 new enrolments. Most students attend classes for two to six months, and approximately 40 percent continue their studies for between one and three (or more) years. To date, over 10,317 students have benefited from our language classes, developing skills to help in obtaining employment and increasing self-confidence. In the future, Lha plans to add more intensive courses and provide students with certificates of completion.

=== Computer skills classes ===
Lha computer training program aims to provide students with viable job skills and consists of two levels of computer training: Beginner and Intermediate. The types of expertise that are taught include typing, internet proficiency, web design, graphic design, and fluency in technology/programs such as email, MS Word, MS Excel, and Adobe Photoshop.

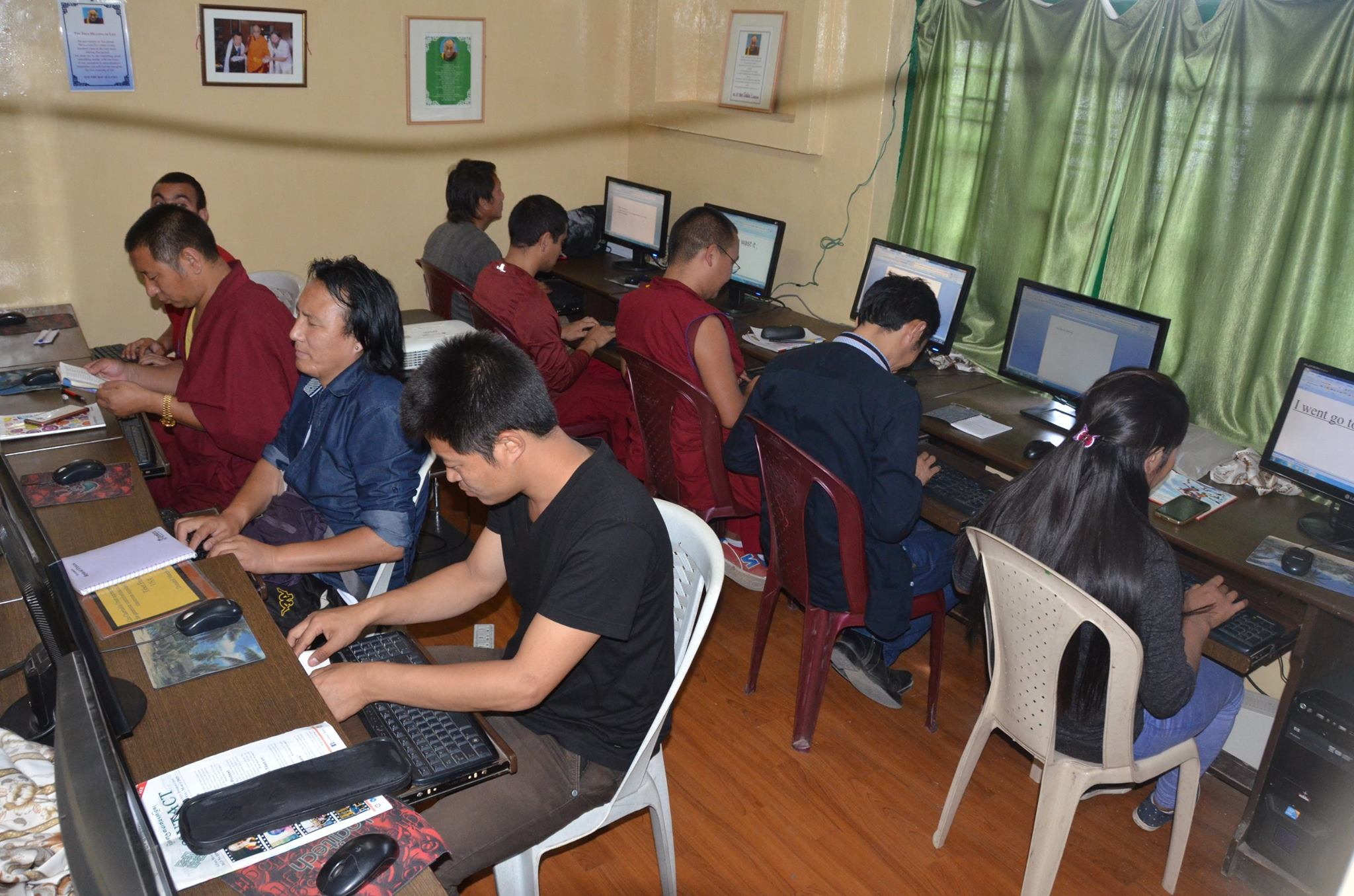
Lha Computer Class

The computer classes attract from twenty to thirty students each month. Lha offers select students full scholarships each month—especially to those refugees who are associated with other local NGOs, such as the Tibetan Women's Association, the Tibetan Youth Congress, and the Kunphen Center. Since 2003, over 2,000 students have benefited from computer skills classes and workshops.

=== Vocational training ===
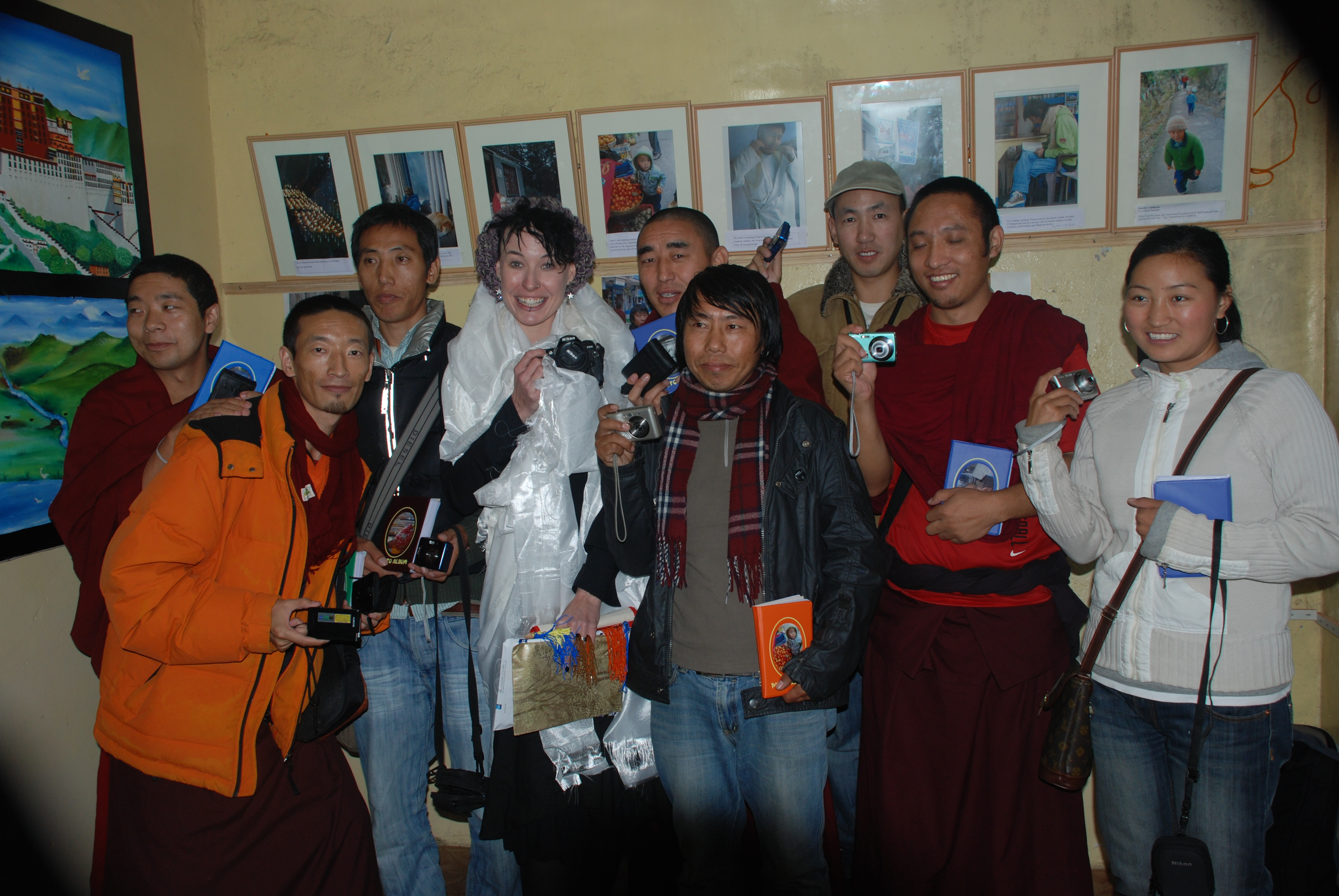
Photography class

Lha provides vocational training, including professionally taught IT classes, photography courses and massage therapy courses. Lha plans to provide other types of vocational skills in the future, such as chef courses.

When a qualified IT teacher is available, Lha offers an IT program focusing on web design and development, graphic design as well as business skills. Basic photography courses taught by professionals, when available, are open to all interested persons. At the course completion, students display their work in the ‘LHA Photography Exhibition.’ Lha also partners with Chung Yuan Christian University to provide a semi-annual IT workshop that is focused on multimedia programs, the Internet and word processing.

Cooking and baking classes are available to those wishing to pursue careers in the food industry.

=== Community soup kitchen ===
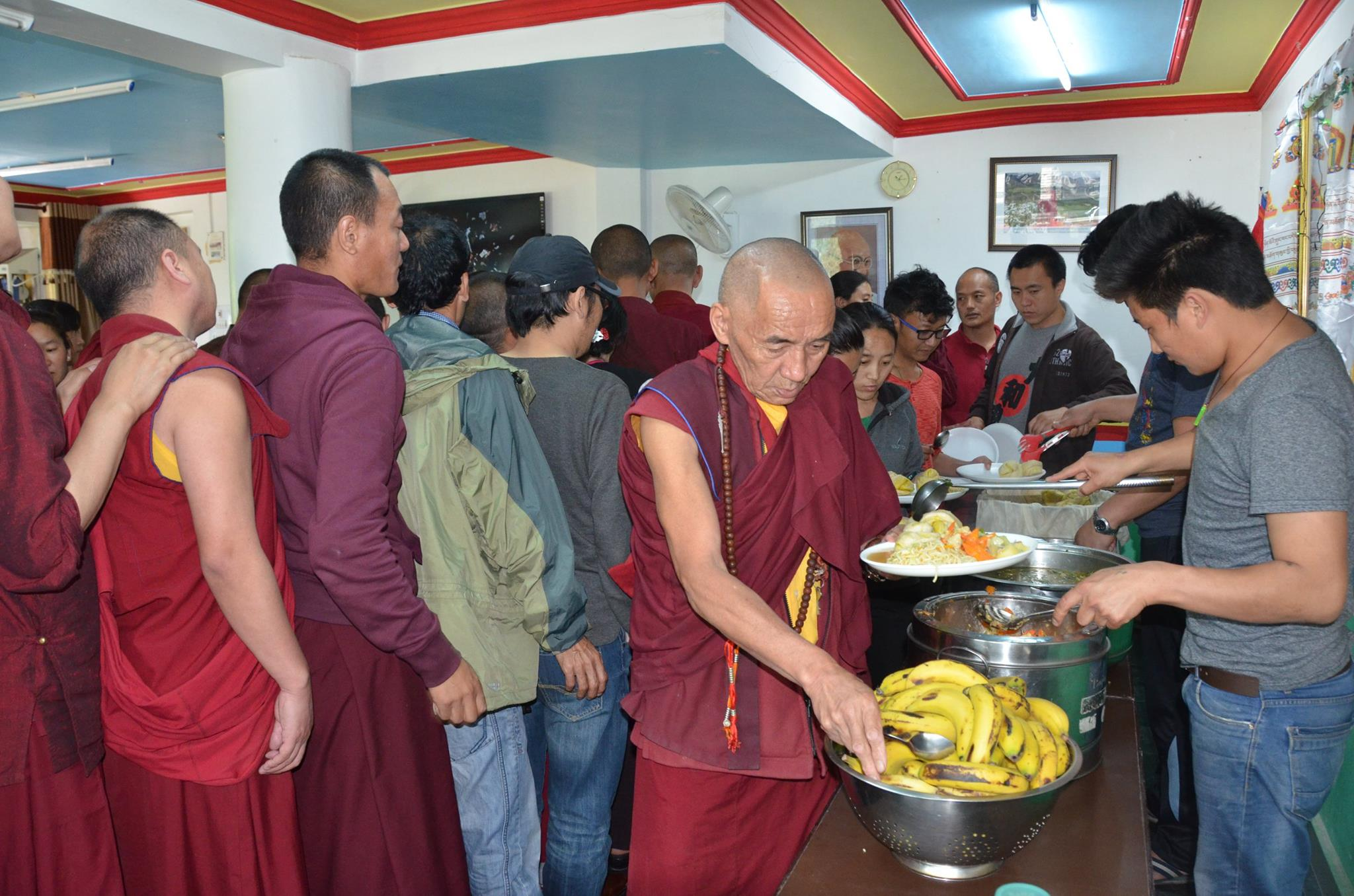
Lha Community Soup Kitchen

To address the problem of limited access to both clean water and nutritious food in the local community, Lha initiated the Community Soup Kitchen Project in 2009. On 6 July 2011, Lha officially opened its soup kitchen in the Ahimsa House venue—it was the first soup kitchen in Dharamsala and provides low-cost, nutritious meals, and clean water to Tibetan refugees (those who cannot afford the nominal fee receive the same services at no cost). In order to fund the monthly cost of the soup kitchen, Lha has partnered with St. Paul's Episcopal Church in Fayetteville, Arkansas, United States (U.S.). In 2011, the church received pledges that amounted to US$1,200 per month and the subsequent goal was to increase this amount to US$2,000 to completely cover the monthly cost of the soup kitchen.

=== Clean Water Project ===
Starting in 2010, the Lha Clean Water project continues to provide clean filtered water to Tibetan communities. The purpose of installing these clean water systems is to ensure that people can access free, filtered water, thus helping to keep the community healthy into the future. The filter unit is an RO+UV+ UF and TTS, which provides high-quality water filtration and more than 100 liters of clean and safe drinking water per hour to students, their teachers, and staff members, while the stainless steel tank is capable of storing 500 liters of water. The water is used not only for drinking but also for cooking, thereby improving the quality of food served at the schools. Additionally, a water cooler providing instant hot and cold filtered water was installed with funds provided directly by Lha. These improvements will help alleviate some of the water-borne illnesses children commonly suffer from in this region, especially during the monsoon season, and will contribute to maintaining a high level of general health among students.

=== Free Community Magazine ===
Contact Magazine is a recognised and registered publication under the Registrar Office of the Newspaper, Ministry of Information & Broadcasting Government of India. The registration number is HPENG/2013/51798. Recognised by Lonely Planet and other international travel resources. Contact has been a popular source of news and information on Tibetan issues, and the Dharamsala community, for over 18 years.

700 – 1,000 copies are printed each month and distributed in the greater Dharamshala area and Delhi, and various diplomatic missions to India. Copies are also sent to various Tibetan schools, settlements, offices and NGOs in India as well as abroad. Contact keeps readers up-to-date on current issues and events, and provides networking, education and volunteer opportunities, as well as social services information.

=== Prof. Samdhong Rinpoche website project ===
To make the writings, speeches and teachings of His Eminence Professor Samdong Rinpoche freely available to the general public, Lha launched a bilingual website (Tibetan and English). The website contains many researched articles, audio and video clips on Buddhist teachings, Tibetan culture and language, democracy, non-violence, and the situation of Tibet, and receives over 11,000 viewers per month. Lha launched this website as an initiative towards preserving Tibet's culture, language and heritage, and to help it to flourish. Professor Samdong Rinpoche, an eminent and distinguished scholar, teacher and philosopher, is a lifelong campaigner of Gandhian principles, and works closely with the Dalai Lama. Rinpoche was the first elected Kalon Tripa (Prime Minister) of the Tibetan Central Administration, and a former Speaker of the Tibetan Parliament in Exile. His services are valued at the highest level in many institutions, including former Principal/Director, Central Institute of Higher Tibetan Studies, Chancellor of Sanchi University of Buddhist-Indic Studies, member of the Expert Advisory Committee, Ministry of Culture, Government of India, and President of the International Buddhist Congregation.

=== Public health initiatives ===
Lha facilitates initiatives to improve community health and increase awareness about the importance of hygiene and physical well-being. Medicine assistance is distributed by Lha to local public health centres, such as Delek Hospital and the Central Tibetan Administration's Department of Health.

Lha provides educational seminars on AIDS, sexual health, and information on sexually transmitted diseases, including free distribution of leaflets and condoms and the importance of their use. Lha also offers seminars on other, more general health issues.

The community kitchen provides extensive hygiene and nutritional education classes to improve community health. Lha incorporates simple health information into its English language classes to help Tibetans effectively communicate with doctors and pharmacists. All donations that are in the form of medicine are distributed by Lha to local public health centres.

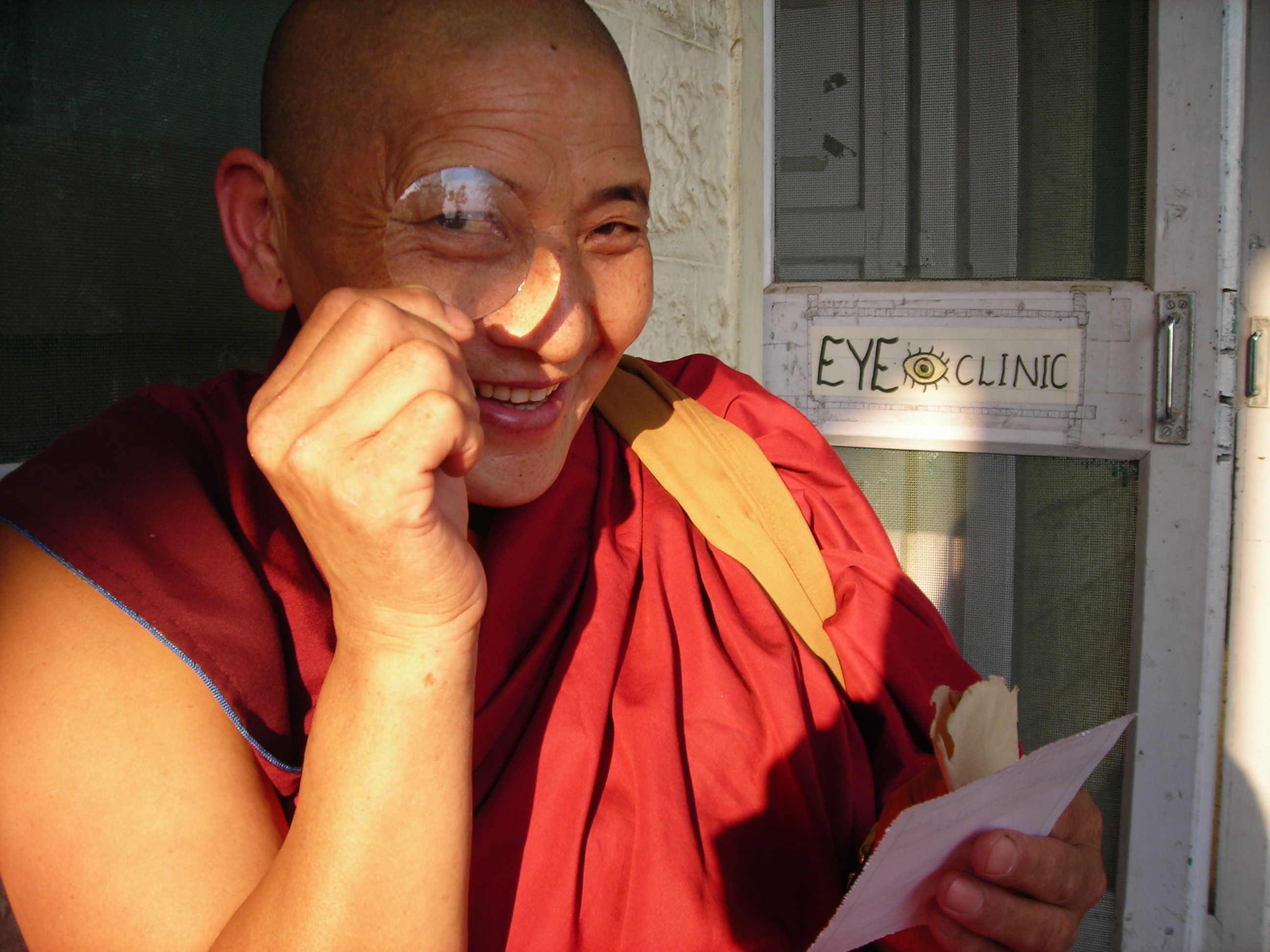
Eye clinic organised by Lha

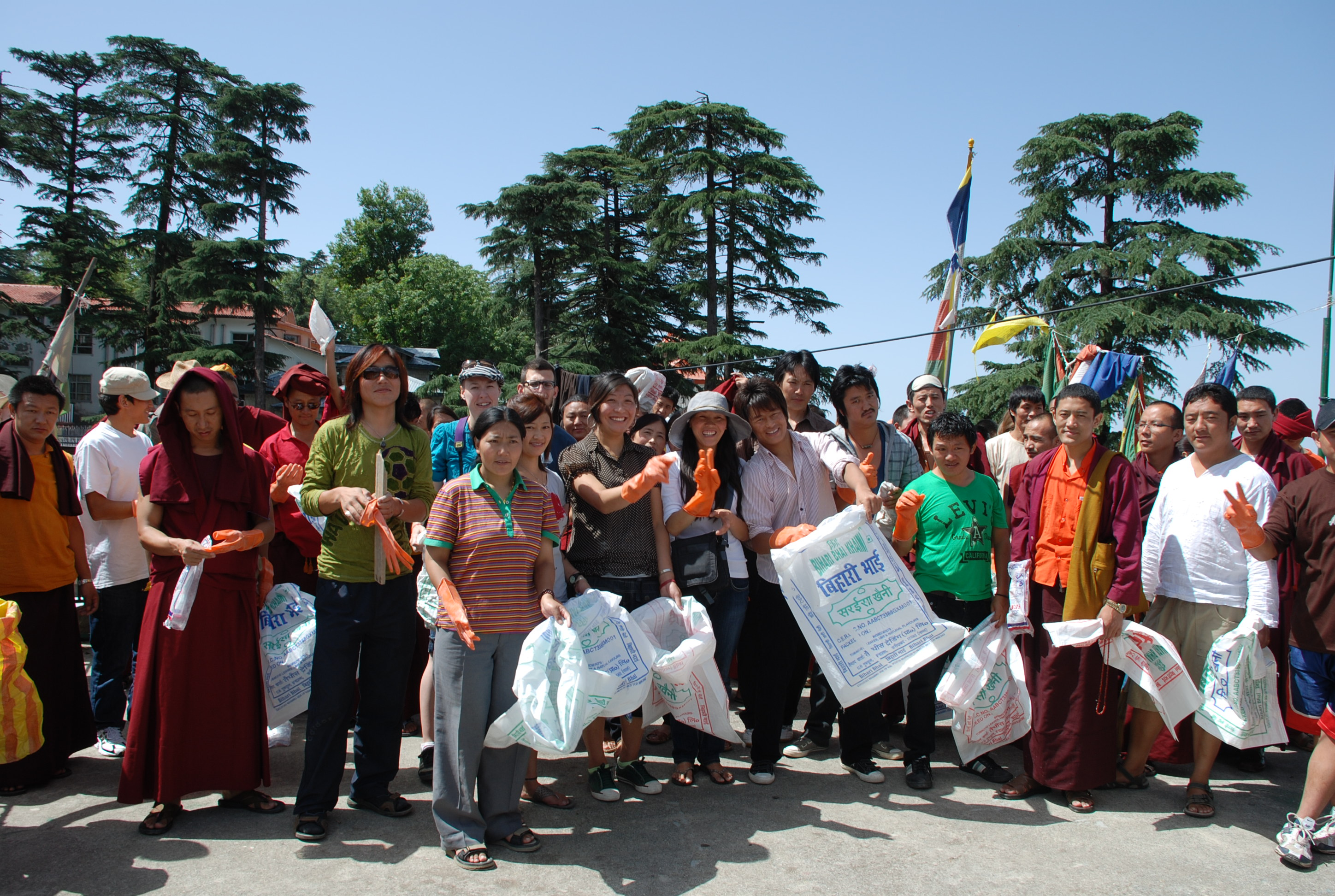
Cleanup camps

=== Free book distribution ===
In July 2008, Lha's U.S. partner, the Omprakash Foundation, shipped a total of 30,000 books from the U.S. to Dharamsala. All of the books were distributed to Tibetan and local Indian schools, charitable organizations, libraries and individuals in Dharamsala and surrounding regions. Lha continues to collect books and donate them to libraries and schools. In 2014, Lha distributed around 340 books, through the Rotary Club Dharamsala.

=== Environmental awareness and aid initiatives ===
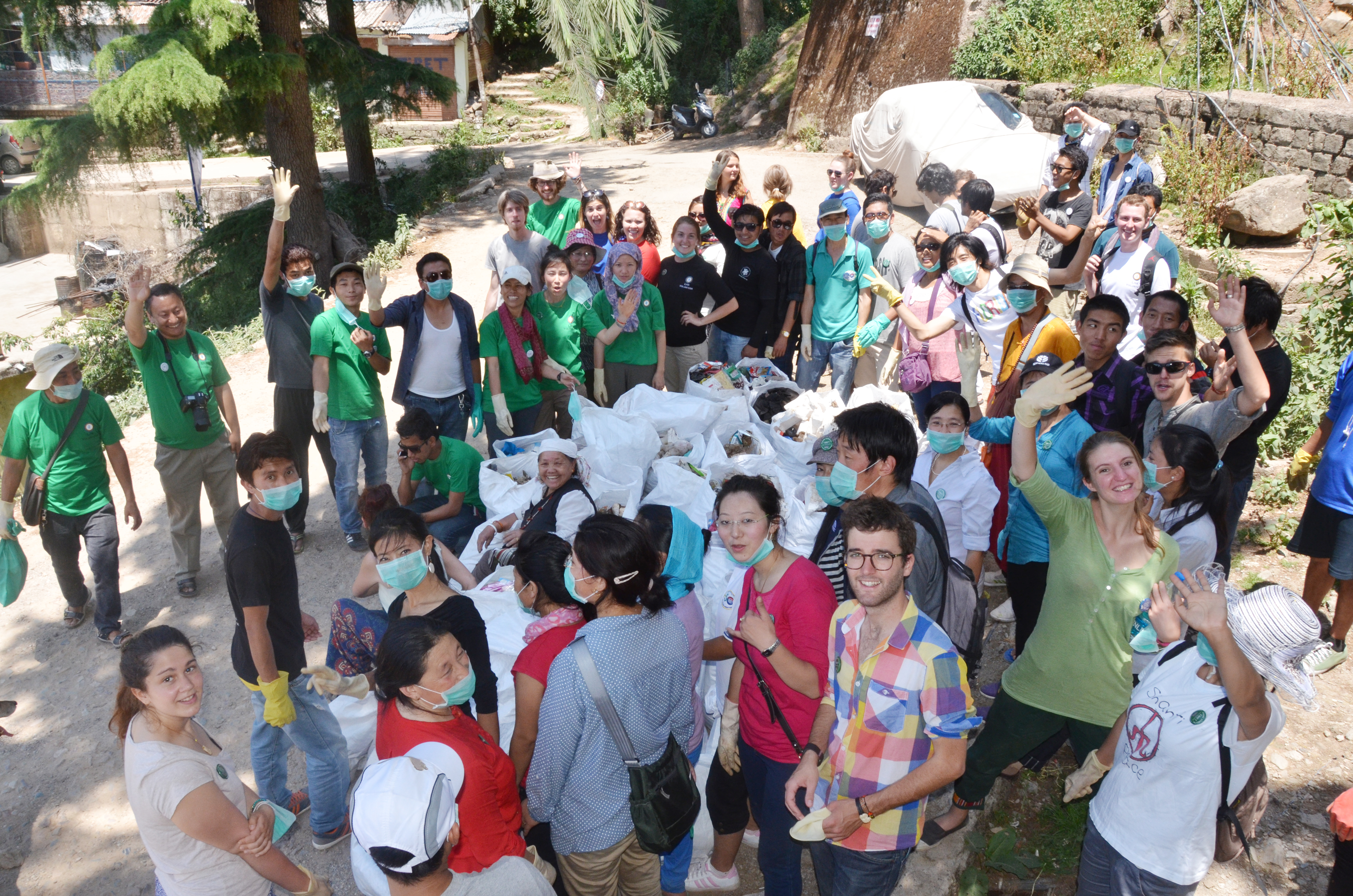
Lha Volunteers helping the Environment

Lha initiates environmental awareness activities such as mass clean-ups, rubbish collection, and the installation of rubbish bins, and provides education on environment conservation. Lha also publishes posters, brochures and leaflets in three languages: English, Tibetan and Hindi in observation of World Environmental Days. In addition, Lha has created an environmental website to inform the global Tibetan and Himalayan communities as well as the general public about the importance of environmental issues in Tibet and the globe. The website includes many researched articles both in English and Tibetan, is updated regularly as new information is available, and is visited over 3000 times a month.

Lha initiates environmental awareness activities, such as environmental clean-ups, rubbish collection, the installation of rubbish bins, and wildlife conservation. Lha also publishes posters, brochures and leaflets in three languages: English, Tibetan and Hindi in observation of World Environmental Days. Lha's volunteers have also helped with the education of students and the local community about the importance of environmental conservation.

In an effort to raise awareness and educate the global Tibetan community on the importance of environmental issues and Tibet's fragile ecology, Lha created a Tibetan-language website.

=== Clothing distribution ===
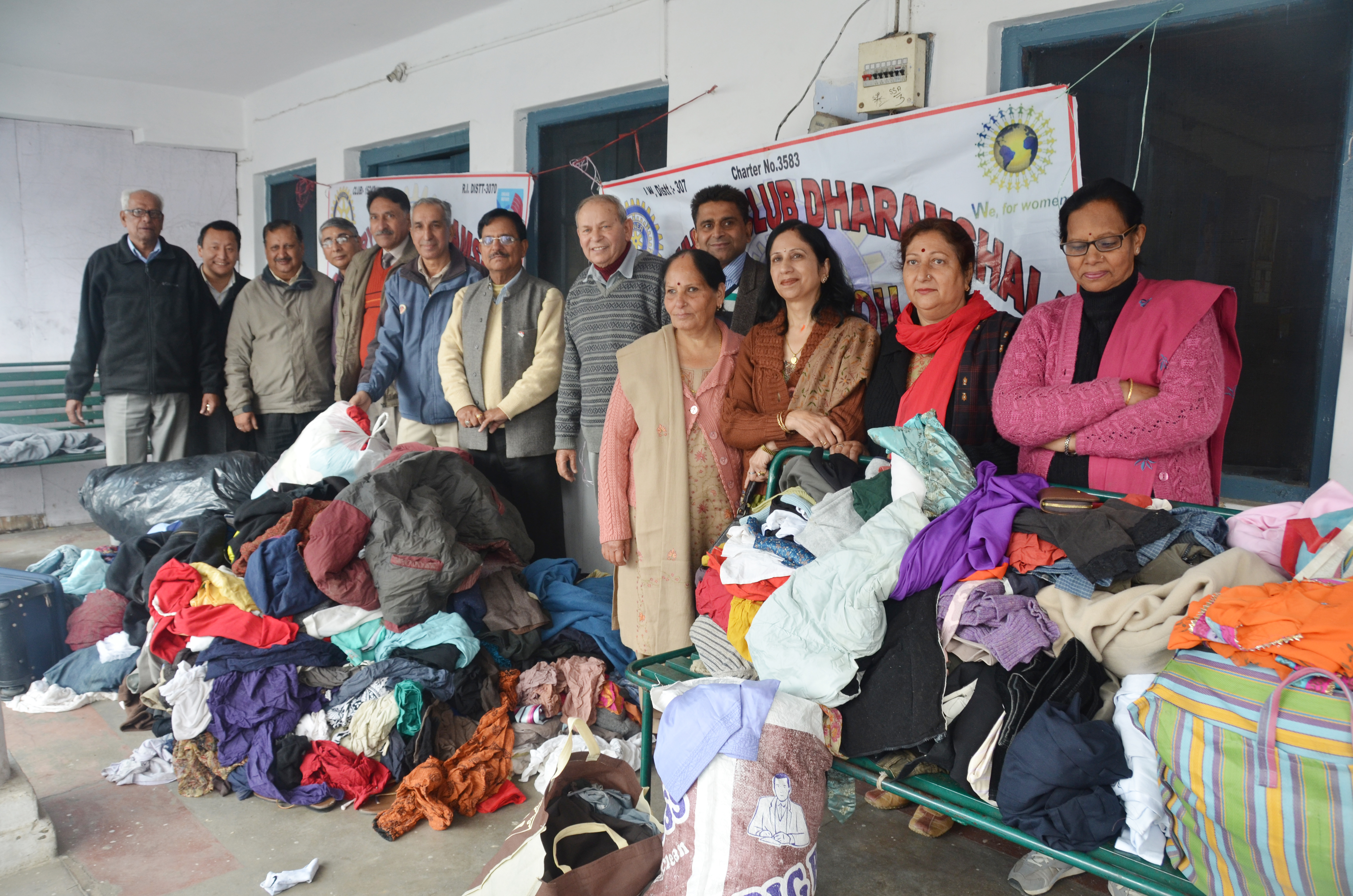
Clothing Distribution With Lha

Lha annually collects thousands of articles of clothing, shoes, and other items at its office on Temple Road—the majority of the collected items are donated by volunteers and visiting tourists. Lha has partnered with the local Rotary Club to facilitate clothing distribution campaigns and, each month, Lha donates 100 to 200 items of clothing to the Rotary Club. The Rotary Club helps with the distribution of clothing to the people who reside in the slums of lower Dharamsala. From Ahimsa House, Lha also coordinates additional campaigns throughout the year that assist the people living in McLeod Ganj. Since its inception, the project has distributed over 25,000 articles of clothing to both the local Indian community and the Tibetan refugee community.

== Cultural Programs ==
Lha offers the following programs for students, volunteers, and other visitors: Cultural exchange, cultural immersion, and Tibetan homestay. The duration of the cultural exchange and cultural immersion programs are typically one to two weeks, while the Tibetan homestay program requires a one-month commitment.

Lha works with student groups from the Tulane University School of Social Work, Centenary College, Loyola University New Orleans, Rustic Path Way, Lifeworks International and other U.S. universities and high schools. In 2011, Lha organized exchange programs for nine student groups from the U.S. and France.

=== Cultural Exchange ===
In 2002, Lha was asked by Tulane University’s School of Social Work to assist a group of graduate social work students on an international social work expedition to Dharamsala . Students were engaged in social work projects within the Tibetan refugee and the local Indian communities, and their cultural exchange program was born.

Lha has been welcoming growing numbers of visiting University and High school groups each year, with a total of 1,229 students to date .

Each visiting student is paired with a ‘Mutual Learning Partner’ – a Tibetan student at Lha. The students share stories about their lives and experiences while engaging in social work and other meaningful activities. Students also visit the homes of their partners, meet other members of their families, and make friends in the Tibetan refugee community. Lha arranges lectures from well-known professionals in the evenings on particular topics like the political situation of Tibet, the social status of Tibetans in Tibet and of Tibetans in exile, Tibetan medicine, and Tibetan Buddhism and culture.

=== Tibetan Homestay ===
Lha organizes month-long homestay programs with participation from Tibetan refugee families. The program provides unique insight into the rituals, traditions, and general family life of Tibetan refugees in Dharamsala and McLeod Ganj. The profits from the homestay program are received by the host families and help support their lives in exile. Lha's organized homestays of one month are with Tibetan refugee families and include accommodation, breakfast and dinner.

=== Community Library ===
Lha has a community library located in McLeod Ganj. Lha's library is the only collection of books available to the community in these locations. Our McLeod Ganj library is well stocked with teaching aids for volunteer teachers and also houses a good collection of novels and non-fiction literature. In addition, the library contains a section dedicated to books about the fundamentals of Buddhism, meditation and happiness. Borrowing is free for all.

== Events ==
=== Celebration for 20 years of Social and Education Service ===
Lha Charitable Trust celebrated its 20th anniversary of providing social services for the Tibetan community, local Indians and people from Himalayan regions. The anniversary was celebrated with a formal event followed by lunch and performances at the Tibetan Institute of Performing Arts hall on 11 November. The Chief Guest at the event was the Speaker of the Tibetan Parliament-in-exile, Khenpo Sonam Tenphel and Dr Nawang Rabgyal, the Justice Commissioner, was a Special Guest, along with representatives of numerous Tibetan and Indian government departments and both local and international NGOs as well as Lha's students, volunteers and former staff members.

The anniversary function commenced with the lighting of the butter lamp and offering of a traditional Tibetan scarf to the Dalai Lama's portrait by the Chief Guest.

The NGO's 20 years: An Incredible Journey and Achievement report in Tibetan and English was launched by the Chief Guests, and a short documentary on Lha's projects was screened during the gathering.

Ngawang Rabgyal, Lha's Director, briefly introduced the organisation, its activities and achievements to date in Tibetan, followed by Dorji Kyi, General Secretary, who read the same in English. Dukthen Kyi, Lha's Board member, read the Dalai Lama's special message for the occasion. Lha's founder and board members, long term volunteers and the longest serving staff member were honoured at the ceremony.

In his address, the Chief Guest expressed appreciation for the work Lha has been doing, and he prayed for further improvements and the organisation's continuity in the future. He said he hopes that Lha will continue its services in Tibet in the future, which will help Tibetans as well as people all over the world.

Anniversary report presentation

The Dalai Lama with Lha's staff and volunteers

Guests at the 20 year anniversary celebration

== Awards ==
In 2014, Lha was awarded second place in the category of "Best Practices of Social Media Usage" in the South Asia-wide 3rd eNGO Challenge Award – Celebrating Digital Information Tools for Communities – South Asia. The Award recognizes the best non-government organisational practices of using information and communication technologies. The presentation ceremony was held at the India Habitat Centre in New Delhi on 5 November. From thousands of NGOs around South Asia, 307 NGOs from Afghanistan, Bangladesh, India, Nepal, Pakistan and Sri Lanka were nominated. In 2015, Lha was awarded first place in the category of "Best Use of Website & Internet Tools" in the 4th eNGO Challenge Award. Lha was recognized for its extensive online presence and effective use of digital tools to carry out its activities. The eNGO Challenge aspires to create an ecosystem by recognizing and honouring NGOs which are using Information Communication Technology (ICT) and digital media tools for good governance and practices that benefit societies and communities at large. It is a joint initiative of the Public Interest Registry (PIR) and the Digital Empowerment Foundation (DEF).
