= Tibet Fund =

US nonprofit organization

- Founded: 1981
- Type: Non-profit
- Location: New York, New York
- President: Bob Ankerson
- Website: tibetfund.org

The Tibet Fund is a 501(c)(3) nonprofit organization based in New York City, New York, United States. It was founded in 1981 under the auspices of the Dalai Lama. The Tibet Fund is the primary funding organization for health, education, refugee rehabilitation, cultural preservation and economic development programs that enable Tibetans in exile and their homeland to sustain their language, culture and national identity.

The organization works closely with the Central Tibetan Administration (CTA) departments of Finance, Health, Education, Home, and Religion and Culture in Dharamsala, India, to implement programs for refugees living in settlements and scattered communities in India, Nepal, and Bhutan.

The Tibet Fund has administered a major annual grant from the US Department of State Bureau of Population, Refugees and Migration for humanitarian aid since 1991; the State Department-funded Tibetan Scholarship Program (TSP) since 1989; and USAID grants for livelihoods, education, health, and culture preservation since 2012.

In 1994, The Tibet Fund initiated the Tibet Assistance Program to address health, educational and economic development needs of Tibetans in Tibet. Working with international and Tibetan grassroots organizations, it supported orphanages, eye camps, emergency relief for natural disasters and cultural and educational programs. The Tibet Fund offers scholarships for Tibetan youth who lack the resources to pursue higher education and has administered an English language and professional training program in Tibet and the US with support from the US Department of State.

== See also ==
- List of organizations of Tibetans in exile
- Tibet
- Tibetan Buddhism
- Government of Tibet in Exile
- Tibetan people
