= Little Tibet, Toronto =

Ethnic enclave in Toronto, Ontario, Canada

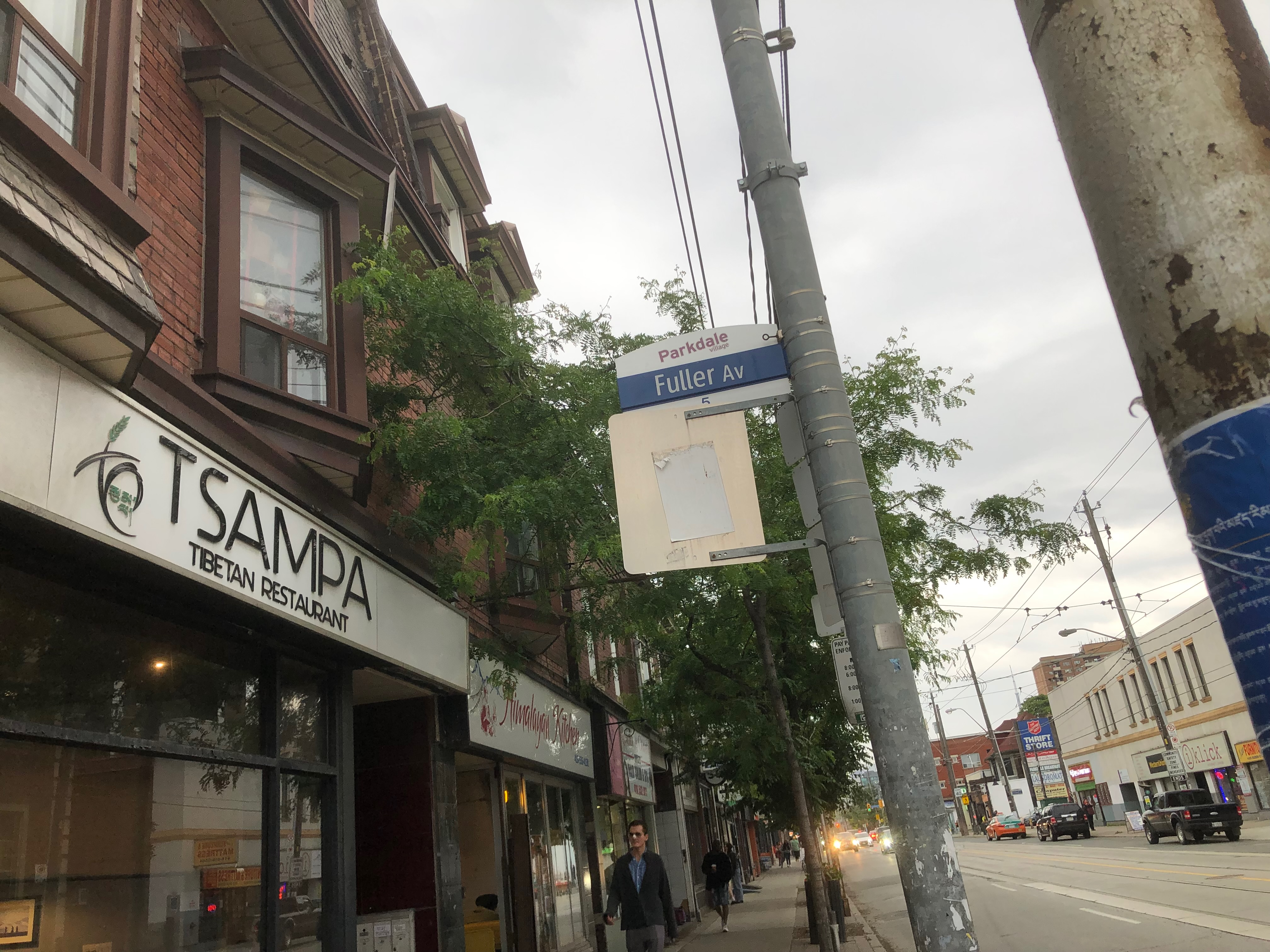
A view of Little Tibet, Toronto

Little Tibet is an Asian ethnic enclave within the neighbourhood of Parkdale in Toronto, Ontario, Canada. The area bound by Queen St. W. to the north, the Gardiner Expressway to the west and south, and Atlantic Avenue to the east is known for its many Tibetan émigrés and Tibetan-related businesses and restaurants. There is also a growing Tibetan community nearby in South Etobicoke but Little Tibet remains the largest.

Almost 3,000 Tibetans moved to Toronto from 1998 to 2008 making the city the home of the largest Tibetan Canadian community, as well as the largest Tibetan diaspora community in North America. More than half of the city's Tibetans settled in Parkdale according to the 2006 census.

The centre of Little Tibet is six blocks of Queen Street West starting at Sorauren Avenue west towards Roncesvalles Avenue where there is a concentration of Tibetan restaurants and shops with varying Indian, Nepalese and Chinese influence depending on the owners. To the north in The Junction is the Riwoche Tibetan Buddhist Temple. Farther west is the Tibetan Canadian Cultural Centre at 40 Titan Road which opened in 2007.

Parkdale Collegiate Institute, on Jameson Avenue, has a 40% Tibetan student population, a demographic that continues to grow. In a study, Toronto journalist Patrick Cain found the name Tenzin to be the most popular baby name in Parkdale, where Little Tibet is located.

== See also ==
- Bhutila Karpoche - A member of Provincial Parliament for Parkdale—High Park who is of Tibetan descent.
