= Chhime Rigzing =

Tibetan government official and spokesman for the 14th Dalai Lama

Representative of His Holiness the Dalai Lama and the Tibetan Government in Exile for Central and Eastern Europe
- In office 27 Aug 2001 – 15 Sep 2005
- Preceded by: Koren Chungdak
- Succeeded by: Kelsang Gyaltsen

Chhime Rigzing, also Chhime Rigzin Chhoekyapa, is a Tibetan government official and senior spokesman for Tenzin Gyatso, the 14th Dalai Lama. He functions as a private secretary and is part of the Central Tibetan Administration in exile in Dharamsala in India.

He was Representative of the Dalai Lama and the Government in Exile to Central and Eastern Europe, as head of the Geneva Tibet Bureau, from 27 August 2001 to 15 September 2005.
