= Khawa Karpo-Tibet Culture Centre =

- Type: Non-profit

Khawa Karpo Tibet Culture Centre Charitable Trust is a non-profit organization that was founded on 16 April 2009. The organization is based in Dharamshala in Himachal Pradesh, India.

Mr. Serta Tsultrim who is the Executive Director of the organization is also the key founder of the group. He is also a member of Tibetan parliament in-exile.

The organization publishes books and weekly newsletter for Tibetan community in exile.

== Goals and Activities ==
The organization works to protect human rights of fellow Tibetans inside Tibet and strengthen the democratic establishment of Central Tibetan Administration in-exile.

It tries to achieve these goals by publishing books and weekly newsletter on Tibetan language, culture, religion, human rights and democratic values. Besides that it also actively maintains a tri-lingual news website in Mandarin, Tibetan and English languages respectively.

== Books published in chronological order ==
- A Chinese scholar's discussion on Tibet’ written in Mandarin and later translated into Tibetan language by Bawa Kalsang Gyaltsen.
- Pashul Serta Lorgue: History of Pashul Serta county. Written by Serta Tsultrim,
- Nag-Tsang-Shilue-Kyidhug. Written by Nag-Tsang Nuedhen Lobsang, it is about the experience of Tibetans during the Chinese Cultural Revolution.
- The history of Batang Place’. Written by Yeshi Gawa, it is about Batang Place in Eastern Tibet.
- The glowing legacy: A brief history of Chosje Khenchen Jigmey Phuntsok and Serta La-rung Buddhist Institute’ by Serta Tsultrim, about Khenpo Jigme Phuntsok.
- Democracy in Exile’ in Chinese by Su-Cha-Hong and translated by Shadong Tashi Gyatso into Tibetan . This book tells about the evolvement of democracy in exile under the 14th Dalai Lama.
- New English-Tibetan-Chinese vocabulary: This new Tibetan vocabulary book was authored by Khenchen Tsultrim Lodro along with many Tibetan scholars.
- Sungbum: a collected work of Khenpo Tsultrim Lodoe, one of the heart disciples of late Khenchen Jigmey Phuntsok.
- Mi Na Ngotro: a book about people working with the 13th Dalai Lama. It is written by Narkyid Ngawang Dhondup.
- Due Thok Charpa: The book reminds monastic institutions of the importance of taking care of proper Buddhist education. Khenpo Tsultrim Lodro is the author.
- Rang Gyal Gi Mirig Nedhon Dang Mirig Ledhon Kor Ki Chirtok (Reflections on China's Ethnic and Nationality . Written by Bawa Phuntsok Wangyal,
- Milam Karpo (Auspicious Dream): a spiritual poetry book written by Wangto Tulku Thupten Norbu.

== See also ==
- List of organizations of Tibetans in exile
