= Tibet Religious Foundation of His Holiness the Dalai Lama =

Non-Profit Organization

The Tibet Religious Foundation of His Holiness the Dalai Lama is one of the offices of the official representation of the 14th Dalai Lama and of the Tibetan government in exile, and a non-profit organization, founded in March 1997 and based in Taipei, Taiwan.

The Office, whose chairman then was Kesang Yangkyi Takla, was open 16 April 1998 in presence of Taiwan President Lee Teng-hui and of Tibetan Minister Sonam Topgyal

The foundation, with Tsegyam Ngawa as its chairman from 2003 to 2008, also serves as a de facto Tibetan representative office in Taiwan.

Since January 2022, Kelsang Gyaltsen Bawa has been serving as the chairman of the Foundation.
