= Empowering the Vision Project =

Empowering The Vision Project
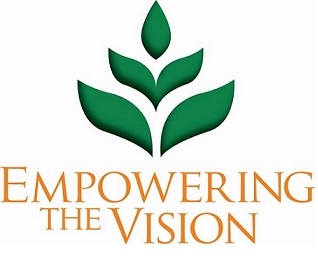
- Founded: 2007
- Type: NGO, Non-profit,
- Location: First Floor, C-72, East of Kailash, New Delhi-110065, India
- Fields: Youth Empowerment, Career, Social Welfare
- Director: Apa Lhamo
- Website: http://www.empoweringvision.org/

Empowering the Vision Project (Envision) is a trust registered under the Indian Trusts Act with the mission to strengthen the Tibetan community through youth empowerment. Envision help young Tibetans become more self-confident, dynamic and self-reliant by providing career services, workshops, training opportunities, exposure visits and other activities. The beneficiaries of Envision are currently spread out in nine different states in India with most of them residing in the Delhi area. Tibet Relief Fund is the core funder of the organisation. The Dalai Lama is the patron of Envision.

== Functions and programmes ==
Envision has programmes that are designed primarily for young Tibetans from the age group of 13-30 irrespective of their background. The services provided by Envision are not limited only to assisting career choices and supporting vocational training courses, but also contributing to the overall development of young Tibetans through exposure programmes and exchange visits. With the long term vision to establish a mentoring programme for school and university students as well as to facilitate Tibetan professionals’ engagement in community development programmes, Envision initiated the Global Tibetan Professionals’ Network in 2008.

=== Building Bridges Project ===
Building Bridges Project is an exposure and exchange programme which is designed to bring together young people from Tibetan and Indian community to foster a relationship of respect, care, learning and sharing. The project is aimed at expanding comfort zones and helping broaden horizons. It also hopes to nurture friendships and relationships between communities, institutions and individuals. Under this project, summer camps, school exchanges and mentoring programmes are being facilitated. Envision has collaborated with Vasant Valley School and American Embassy School as well as non-governmental organizations like Ritinjali and Initiatives of Change.

=== Tibetan career services ===
Envision partnered with TechnoServe and Department of Home, Central Tibetan Administration in a USAID funded economic development for Tibetans programme to counsel, train and place Tibetans in jobs in 2012. Under this project, Envision has offered counseling, job readiness trainings and job placement assistance to unemployed youth. This was followed up with a six-month project with the Department of Home of the Central Tibetan Administration which ended in July 2014. Envision provides career guidance in the form of individual counseling as well as employability skills trainings. Envision is gradually working towards building job linkages, providing subsidised trainings and promoting apprenticeship.

=== Global Tibetan professional's network ===
The Global Tibetan Professionals Network was launched on November 1, 2008 to provide a platform for Tibetan professionals worldwide to network with each other and find creative ways of contributing to the Tibetan community.
