= Political Prisoners Movement of Tibet =

- Type: Non-profit

The GuChuSum Political Prisoners Movement of Tibet is an organization of Tibetan exiles. Established on September 27, 1991, by self-designated former political prisoners, the words "Gu Chu Sum" stand for the numbers 9, 10 and 3, which mark three months in modern Tibetan history—September 1987, October 1987, and March 1988—, when major unrest were crushed in Lhasa, the capital of Tibet. It is one of four major NGOs of the Tibet-in-exile community. All 256 members of GuChuSum are former political prisoners.

== Aims ==
The aim of the organisation is to create awareness about "political prisoners" in Tibet and human rights violations in Tibet to an international audience. The Movement also aims to educate the ex-political prisoners in exile with daily Tibetan, computer skills and English lessons and to give them medical care, economic assistance, food and housing in India. GuChuSum supports these activities with a restaurant and garment production center.

== Activities ==
- Providing food, shelter and healthcare for ex-political prisoners.
- Providing income to ex-political prisoners in India.
- Providing education for ex-political prisoners in India.
- Publishing a bi-monthly newsletter and the annual "Tibetan Envoy" magazine.
- Documenting high-profile political prisoners inside in Tibet.
