= Offices of Tibet (Dharamshala) =

Offices of Tibet are official agencies of the 14th Dalai Lama and the Central Tibetan Administration based in Dharamshala, India. They are present in 13 countries, based in New Delhi, Kathmandu, Geneva, Washington, D.C., Tokyo, London, Paris, Moscow, Brussels, Canberra, Pretoria, Taipei and Budapest. They are in charge of bilateral relations with different countries as well as with European Union Institutions and the United Nations Organisation. They represent de facto embassies.

== See also ==
- Tibet Bureau (Geneva)
