= Tseten Samdup Chhoekyapa =

Tibetan diplomat

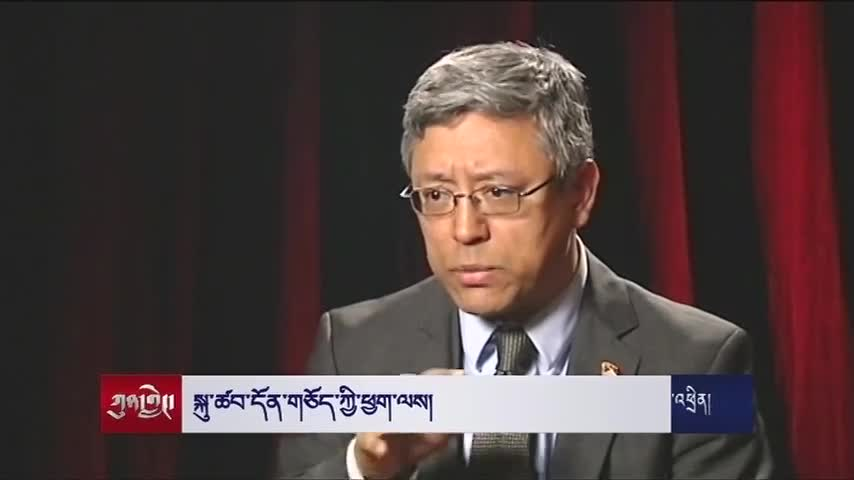

Representative of the Dalai Lama and the Tibetan Government in Exile for Central and Eastern Europe
- Incumbent
- Assumed office 1 April 2008
- Preceded by: Kelsang Gyaltsen

Tseten Samdup Chhoekyapa is a former official of the Tibetan Government in Exile. He served as the Representative of the Dalai Lama and the Tibetan Government in Exile in Geneva from March 2008 to September 2014, and in Brussels from October 2014 to March 2016. He also worked at the Office of Tibet in London from 1990 to 2000. He has previously worked for the Tibetan exile government in Dharamsala, India before travelling to USA in 1990 for his post graduate studies.

The Tibet Bureau in Geneva was responsible for Central and Eastern Europe, as well as for the United Nations in Geneva, while the Bureau du Tibet in Brussels was primarily responsible for the European Union and the European Parliament in Belgium.

Born in a refugee camp in the Himalayas after his parents escaped Tibet in 1959 following the annexation of Tibet by the People's Republic of China.

He is a graduate of Columbia University in New York, where he attended the Graduate School of Journalism.

He is a board member of the Gaden Phodrang Trust in India and the Gaden Phodrang Foundation of the Dalai Lama in Switzerland, as well as a founding signatory of the Prague Declaration on European Conscience and Communism.

Since April 2016, he has been based in Dharamsala, India, where he serves as one of the Secretaries to His Holiness the Dalai Lama.
