= International Tibet Network =

Organization to end China's occupation of Tibet

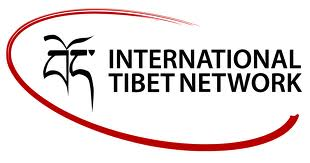
- Founded: 2000
- Type: Non-profit 501(c)(3) charitable corporation
- Purpose: Human rights in Tibet
- Location: San Francisco, California Field Office in Dharamshala
- Region served: Worldwide
- Members: 120+ member organizations
- Executive Director: Mandie McKeown
- Staff: 9
- Website: tibetnetwork.org

The International Tibet Network, established in 2000, is a global coalition of Tibet-related non-governmental organisations campaigning to end China's occupation and human rights violations in Tibet, and restore rights to the Tibetan people. Its purpose is to maximise the effectiveness of the worldwide Tibetan Freedom Movement. The Network works to increase the capacity of individual member organisations, develops coordinated strategic campaigns, and encourages increased cooperation among organisations.

== History ==
Established in 2000, International Tibet Network has demanded the release of Gedhun Choekyi Nyima, the 14th Dalai Lama's choice for 11th Panchen Lama, calling him "the youngest political prisoner".

In 2004, just hours before organizers of the 2008 Beijing Games were to receive the Olympic flag, at the closing ceremony at 2004 Summer Olympics in Athens, six International Tibet Network activists unfurled a black flag with five bullet holes replacing the Olympic rings, and began marching toward the main stadium, before being seized by the police.

In 2008, International Tibet Network demonstrated outside the International Olympic Committee headquarters, demanding the exclusion of Tibetan areas from the 2008 Summer Olympics torch relay, and demanded that the IOC make a statement about the 2008 Tibetan unrest.

== Functions ==
=== Coordination ===
The Network's Secretariat arranges regular Regional Meetings for its member organisations in order for groups to skill-share and engage in detailed strategic planning.

The Network has Regional Coordinators in Asia and in Latin America. They are responsible for building the regional network and assisting Members in finding appropriate regional strategies for implementing global campaigns. They provide support and advice, especially to newly formed groups.

=== Campaigns ===
The current priority for the Tibet movement is to "Put Tibetans in Tibet First" and highlight their continued resistance to China's rule. This resistance takes many forms; from self-immolations to mass public protests – such as the Uprisings in 2008, to more subtle "cultural resistance", which emphasizes and celebrates the Tibetan national identity in music, writings and poetry.

The International Tibet Network develops coordinated campaign strategies in a variety of ways, including forming Campaign Working Groups made up of representatives of member organisations, appointing specially chosen Task Forces or working through Campaign Coordinators.

=== Capacity building ===
The International Tibet Network aims to increase the capacity of the movement by helping its member organisations build their resources and increase the skill-base of their campaigners. The Capacity Building programme includes regular training — often in conjunction with Regional Meetings — and a small grant scheme for members to undertake capacity building or specific campaign projects.

== Secretariat ==
The International Tibet Network Secretariat reports to the steering committee. Its role is to implement policy and priorities.

== Steering committee ==
The International Tibet Network's steering committee is responsible for setting policy, ensuring the Network meets its financial and legal commitments and hiring the executive director. Steering committee members are elected from all the regions of the world where there are Tibet Groups (six continents).

The steering committee consists of representatives elected by the International Tibet Network's member organisations on a regional basis. The Tibetan Government in Exile appoints a two-person liaison for purposes of assuring dialogue, consultation and co-ordination. The International Tibet Network operates independently of the Tibetan Government in Exile, and its two-person liaison representatives have no voting rights on the steering committee. The number of seats on the steering committee for each region is set out below. This structure takes into consideration the number of groups, the number of countries with groups and the number of United Nations member states in each region.

== See also ==
- Tibetan independence movement
- Government of Tibet in Exile
