= Lobsang Nyandak =

President at The Tibet Fund

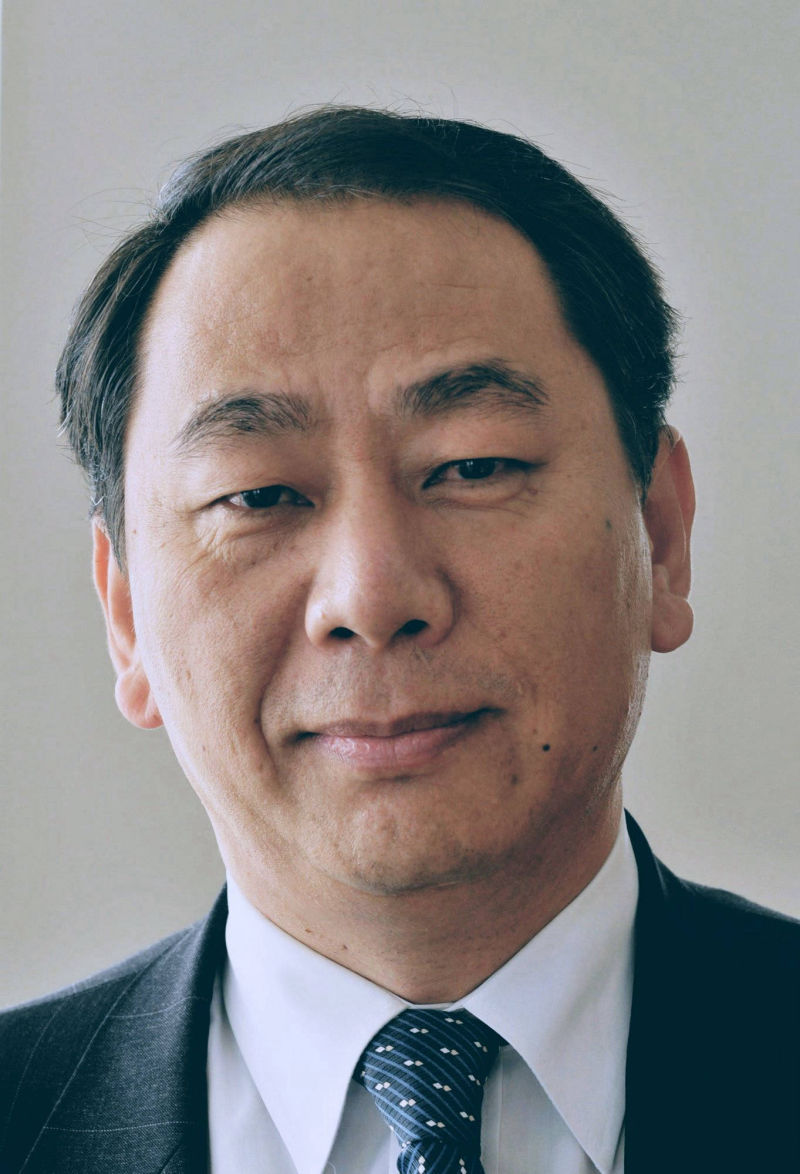
- Lobsang Nyandak, 7 November 2019

Finance Minister of the Central Tibetan Administration
- In office 2001–2006
- Prime Minister: Lobsang Tenzin
- Preceded by: Söpa Gyatso
- Succeeded by: Tsering Dhondup

Health Minister of the Central Tibetan Administration
- In office 2001–2005
- Prime Minister: Lobsang Tenzin
- Preceded by: Samkhar Yangkee Dhashi
- Succeeded by: Thupten Lungrik

Foreign Minister of the Central Tibetan Administration
- In office 2005–2006
- Prime Minister: Lobsang Tenzin
- Preceded by: Lobsang Tenzin
- Succeeded by: Kesang Yangkyi Takla

Personal details
- Born: Lobsang Nyandak; 15 December 1965 (age 60) Kalimpong, India
- Party: National Democratic Party of Tibet
- Education: Panjab University
- Occupation: Politician, executive
- Known for: Tibetan Center for Human Rights and Democracy, The Tibet Fund
- Website: https://lobsangnyandak.com/

Lobsang Nyandak, sometimes written Lobsang Nyendak (Tibetan: བློ་བཟང་སྙན་གྲགས, Wylie: blo bzang snyan grags) also called Lobsang Nyandak Zayul (Tibetan: བློ་བཟང་སྙན་གྲགས་རྫ་ཡུལ, Wylie: blo bzang snyan grags rdza yul) is a Tibetan diplomat and politician. born in 1965 in Kalimpong, India where he performed his studies in Herbertpur and at Panjab University in Chandigarh. There, he held functions at Tibetan Youth Congress before becoming the founding executive director of the Tibetan Centre for Human Rights and Democracy. Member of the National Democratic Party of Tibet, he was elected deputy and was selected as a minister by Samdhong Rinpoche (Lobsang Tenzin), the first elected Kalon Tripa of Central Tibetan Administration (CTA). He then was the Representative of the 14th Dalai Lama to the Americas and became president of The Tibet Fund.

== Early life and education ==
Nyandak was born in Kalimpong, India in 1965 to a Tibetan refugee family. He completed his elementary and high school education at SFF Tibetan School in Herbertpur, India, a school for children of Tibetan families recruited into the Special Frontier Force (SFF). Nyandak graduated from Panjab University in Chandigarh, India, with a B.A. and a B.Ed. in 1986.

== Career ==
=== Tibetan Youth Congress (1988–1995) ===
Nyandak served as General Secretary of the Regional Tibetan Youth Congress (RTYC) in Chandigarh, India (1987-89). Nyandak became Executive Secretary and Joint Secretary of the Central Executive Committee (Centrex) of the Tibetan Youth Congress (TYC) (1990–92) and later took over as General Secretary of TYC (1992–1995).

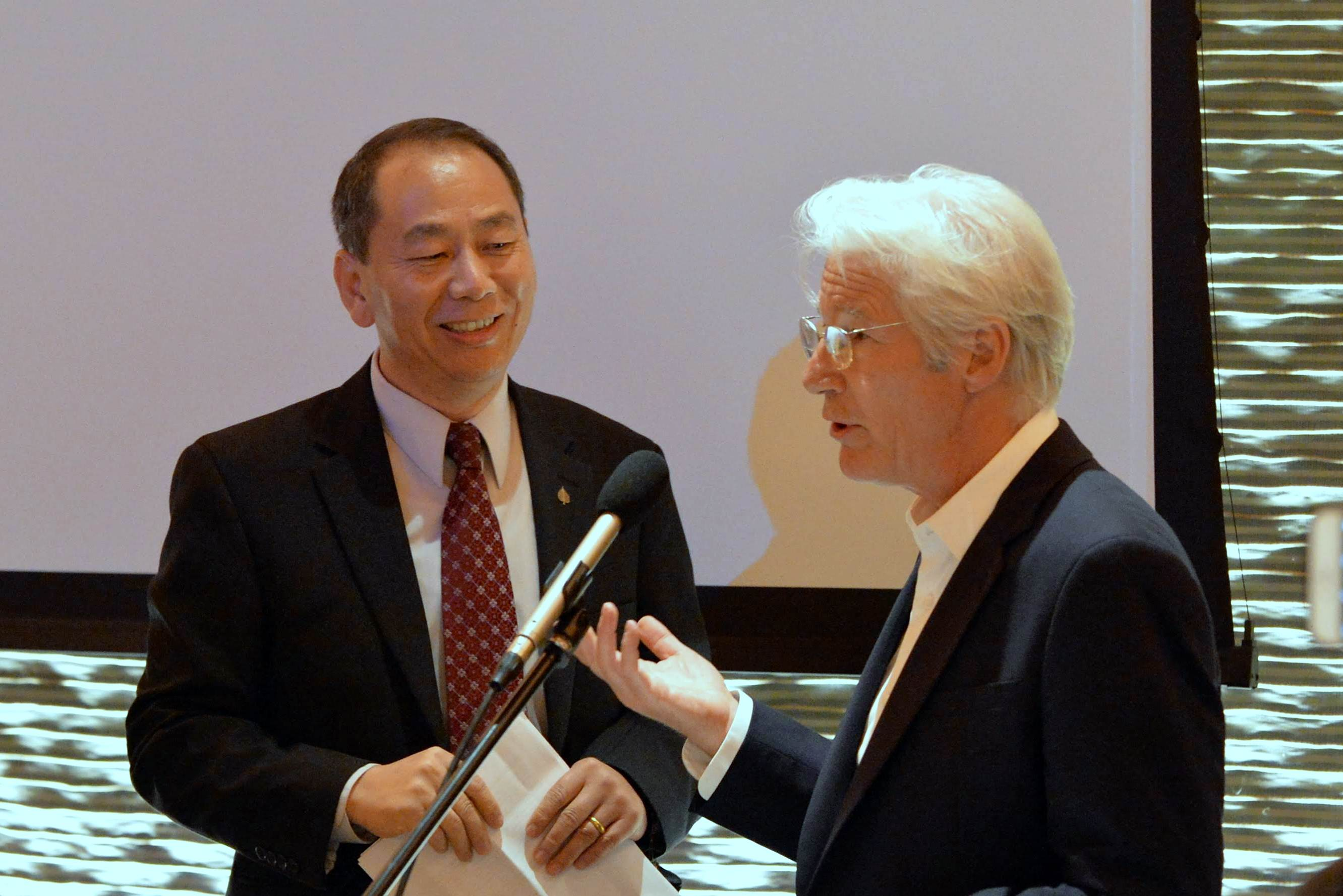
Lobsang Nyandak and Richard Gere during The Tibet Fund annual gala at Le Bernardin Privé in New York on October 19, 2016

=== Tibetan Center for Human Rights and Democracy (1996–2001) ===
Nyandak was the founding executive director of the Tibetan Centre for Human Rights and Democracy (TCHRD), a non-governmental human rights organisation established in January 1996 in Dharamsala. He represented Tibetans at international conferences, such as in 1997 at the UN Human Rights Commission; in 1998 at a conference-debate on Human Rights and Asian values organized by International Federation for Human Rights and Wei Jingsheng on the sidelines of the UN Human Rights Commission session in Geneva; in 2001 at the World Conference against Racism in South Africa. Following his appointment as minister in 2001, Nyandak served as Vice Chairman of the Board of Directors of the TCHRD from 2001 until 2004.

=== Deputy (1996–2001) ===
In 1996, Nyandak was elected to the Tibetan Parliament, to represent the province of Kham in Eastern Tibet. During this period, Nyandak also served as vice president and Secretary of the executive committee of the National Democratic Party of Tibet.

=== Minister (2001–2006) ===
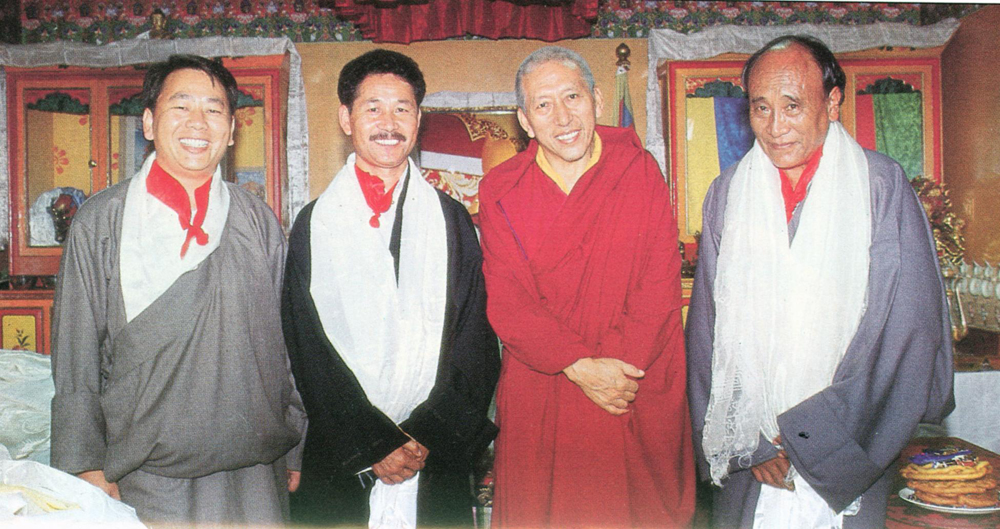
Lobsang Nyandak, Thupten Lungrik, Samdhong Rinpoche and Lobsang Nyima, wearing khata and red ribbons.

In 2001, Nyandak was appointed as a Minister (Kalon) during the first tenure of Samdhong Rinpoche (Lobsang Tenzin), the first elected Prime Minister (Kalon Tripa) of the Central Tibetan Administration. As a Kalon, Nyandak was in charge of three departments: the Department of Information and International Relations (2005–2006), the Department of Finance (2001–2006) and the Department of Health (2001–2005).

As Minister of International Relations, Nyandak served as a member of the Task Force of the Sino-Tibetan Dialogue from 2005 to 2006 and again from 2012 to present.

As Minister of Finance, Nyandak oversaw the overall financial health of the CTA and established Tibetan business bodies, including the Tibetan Chamber of Commerce. During this time period, Nyandak also served as vice-chairman of the Board of Directors of the CTA's Social and Resource Development Fund (SARD) and Managing Trustee of the Dalai Lama's Charitable Trust.

=== Representative of the 14th Dalai Lama (2008–2013) ===
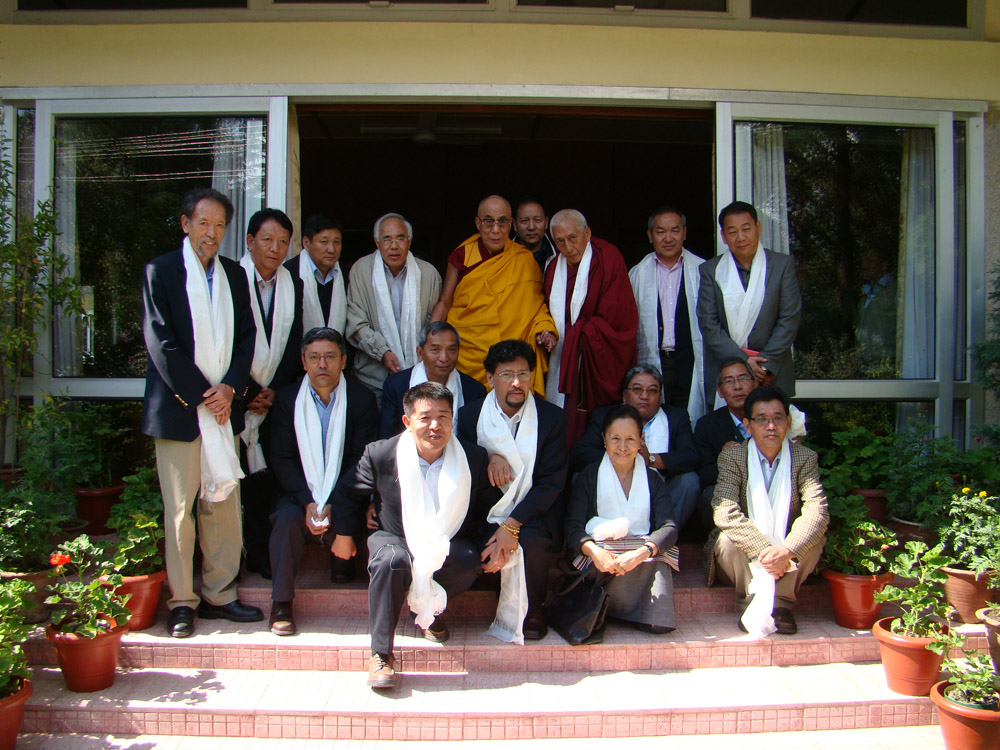
Lobsang Nyandak (on the right end) with other representatives of the Dalai Lama from around the world at a two-day meeting in Dharamsala October 2009 (the Dalai Lama is in the center with Samdhong Rinpoche).

Nyandak moved to the United States with his family in 2007 and joined the Tibet Fund as its development director in 2008 until he was appointed as the Representative of the 14th Dalai Lama at the Office of Tibet in United States from September 2008 to 2013. He was responsible for organizing visits of the Dalai Lama to North America, including arranging meetings with leaders and educators.

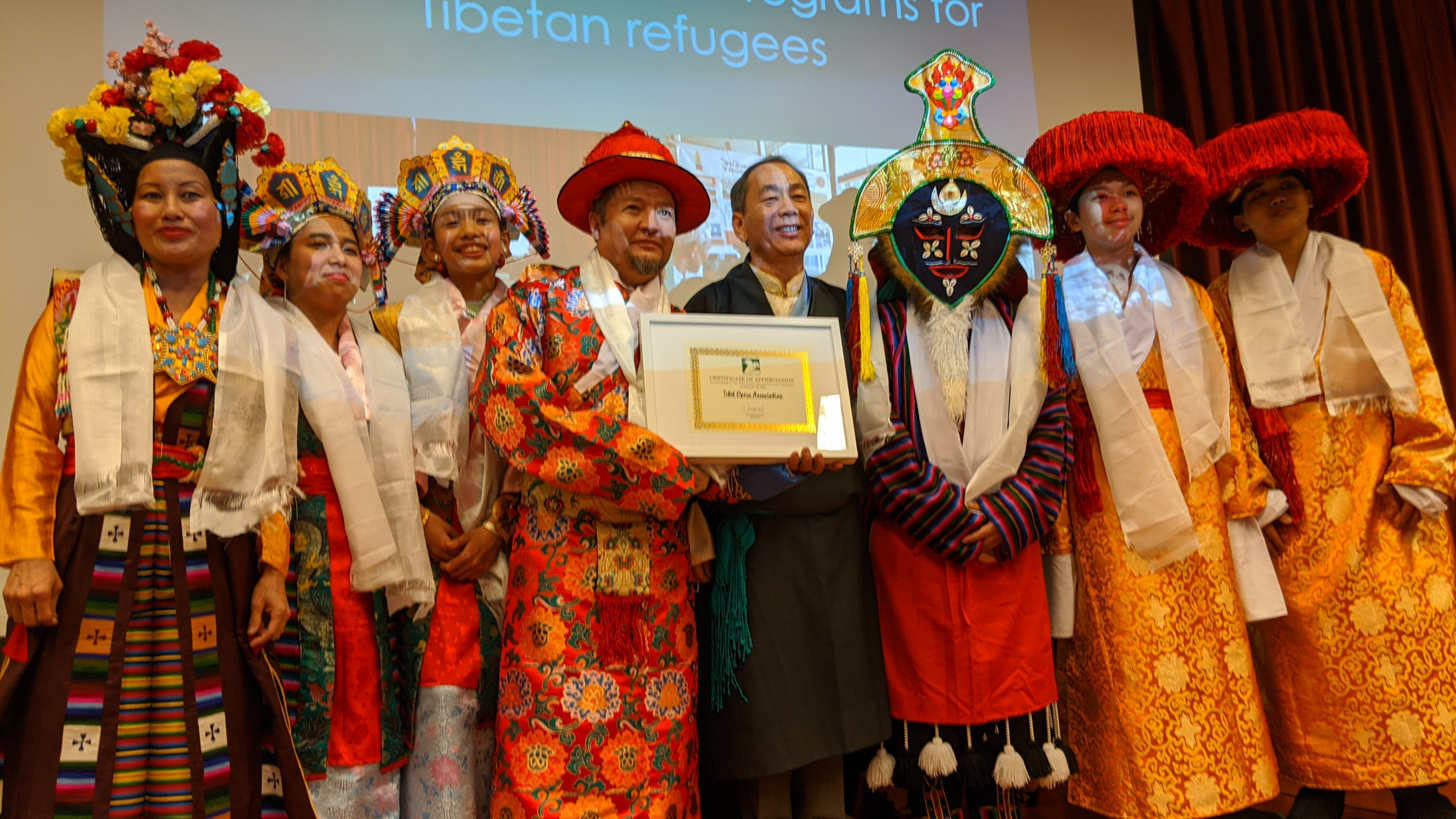
Lobsang Nyandak at Tibetan Lunar New Year – Losar 2147, New York, Tibet Fund (20 February 2020)

=== Tibet Fund (2013–present) ===
In 2013, Nyandak was appointed as the executive director of the Tibet Fund, and in 2017, he became President of the organization.

=== Prime Minister campaigns ===
==== 2011 ====
Lobsang Nyandak was candidate initially for the 2011 election of Tibetan Prime Minister and a poll directed by Shambala Post estimated he was second in popularity, after Lobsang Sangay. He finally decided not to run for the 2011 election.

==== 2021 ====
On March 2, 2020, Lobsang Nyandak publicly announced his candidacy for the 2021 election of Tibetan Prime Minister (Sikyong).

In his program, he declares he is confident to re-establish contact with the Chinese Government to resolve the Tibetan issue, and aims to transform Tibet in a peace zone, as envisaged by the 14th Dalai Lama

== Publications ==
- The Dalai Lama Institution is a Year Older!, Tibet Sun, 7 July 2020
- Opinion: Why am I running for Sikyong?, Tibetan Review, 16 August 2020
- The Dalai Lama and American Presidents: A Story of Faith, Diplomacy and Friendship, 2026

== See also ==
- 2021 Central Tibetan Administration general election
- 1996 Tibetan Parliament in Exile election
- Samdhong Rinpoche
- Sikyong
