= 2001 Central Tibetan Administration general election =

- 29 July 2001
- Kalön Tripa
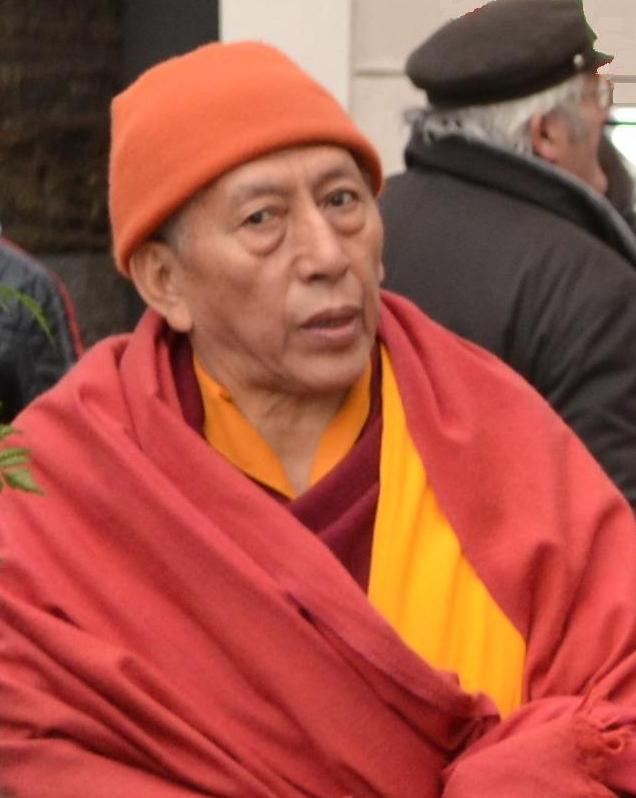

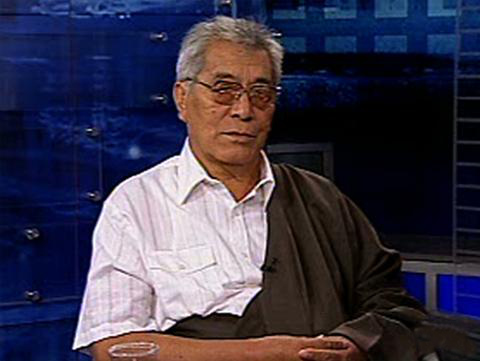
Candidate	Lobsang Tenzin	Juchen Thubten Namgyal
Party	Independent	Independent
Popular vote	29,000
Percentage	84.54%	12%
Kalön Tripa before election
Sonam Topgyal
Independent
Elected Kalön Tripa
Lobsang Tenzin
Independent

General elections for the Central Tibetan Administration (the Tibetan government in exile) were held on 29 July 2001. For the first time, voters elected the Kalön Tripa (Prime Minister), as well as members of Parliament. Previously the Prime Minister had been appointed by the Dalai Lama under the Parliament's ratification. This was part of a series of reforms encouraged by the Dalai Lama for the democratization of the exile Tibetan community. Lobsang Tenzin, the 5th Samdhong Rinpoche won the election with more than 80% of the vote.

== Results ==
=== Kalön Tripa ===
As is traditional in this process, preliminary or sometimes called primary elections were held months before, on 12 May 2001 with the following results:

Candidate	Votes	%
Lobsang Tenzin	31,444	82.75
Juchen Thubten Namgyal	3,732	9.82
Gyalo Thondup	2,304	6.06
Gyari Lodoe Gyaltsen	330	0.87
Tenzin Tethong	104	0.27
Sakya Trizin	84	0.22
Total	37,998	100.00
Source: CTA,
