= Tsering Wangchuk =

Tibetan politician and physician (born 1974)

Kalon for Health of the Central Tibetan Administration
- Prime Minister: Lobsang Sangay
- Incumbent
- Assumed office 16 September 2011

Personal details
- Born: 1974 (age 51–52) Leh, Ladakh, India
- Education: Campus Law Centre, Faculty of Law, University of Delhi

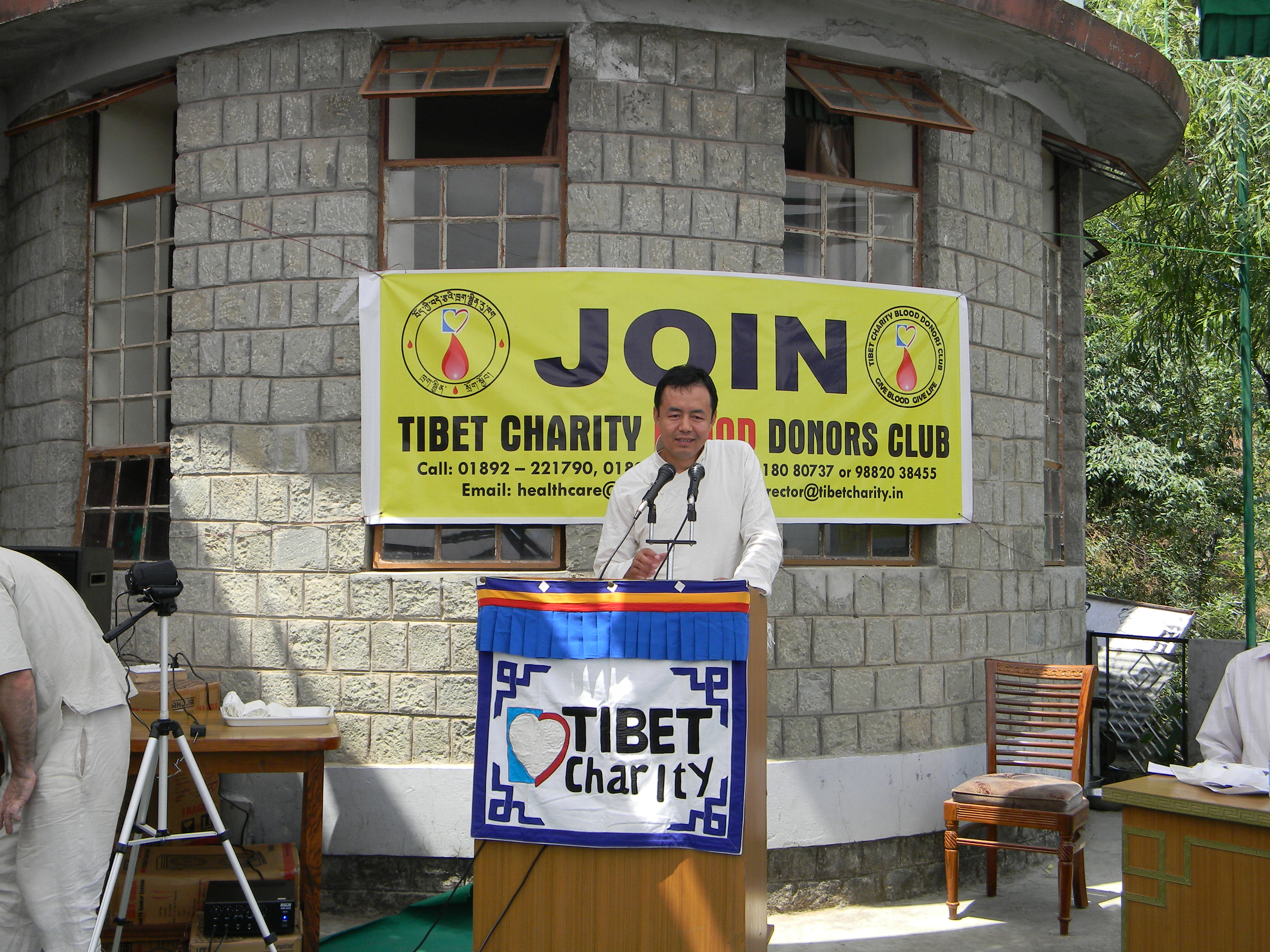
Tsering Wangchuk, 2012 in Dharamsala

Tsering Wangchuk (born 1974) is a Tibetan politician and physician serving as the Kalon for Health of the Central Tibetan Administration since 2011.

== Biography ==
Wangchuk was born in Leh, Ladakh, in 1974. He is an allopathic medical doctor by profession. He completed school education from Central School for Tibetan at Dalhousie and Mussoorie, India in 1993. He received his law degree from the prestigious Campus Law Centre of the Faculty of Law, University of Delhi. He received a fellowship from the Department of Education to study in Warsaw, Poland, where he became doctor in medicine, and spent two years of internship at Hospital of Medical University of Warsaw. In 2003 he returned to India and worked as resident medical officer at Phuntsokling Menlha Hospital from 2003 and 2008. From 2008 to 2009 he worked as medical officer for the Tibetan Refugee Self-Help Centre in Darjeeling. Since 2009, he was the senior medical officer at Tsojhe Khangsar Charity Hospital, Bylakuppe.

As nominated by the first democratically elected Sikyong (the Political leader) of the Tibetan People, Lobsang Sangay, and unanimously approved by the Tibetan Parliament, he accepted the post of Kalon and took the oath of office from the chief justice commissioner on 16 September 2011. He officially took the responsibility to lead the Department of Health (Tibetan Voluntary Health Association) as its 15th Kalon on 19 September 2011. He had an honor and privilege to succeed Kalon Chope Paljor Tsering. He look forward to lead the DoH (TVHA) and improve the health conditions of the Tibetan people to the best of his abilities. Since 16 September 2011, under the leadership of the Tibetan Prime minister Lobsang Sangay, he is the minister for Health.

Wangchuk is also the chairman of the Governing Body of the Tibetan Medical and Astro Institute, Men-Tsee-Khang which is also part of Department of Health of Central Tibetan Administration. During a visit to Taiwan, Wangchuk met Chiu Wen-ta, Taiwanese health minister, Hsu Min Hu Director of Bureau of International Cooperation, Department of Health and Lee Ming-liang, Taiwan's former minister of health on 11 April 2012 at Taiwanese health offices to promote support for the health care system in the exile Tibetan community. During his tenure, following are his five top priorities of Central Tibetan Administration's Department of Health

1. Health information system
2. Public health – mainly in disease prevention and health promotion focusing on health education
3. Tibetan medicare system
4. Health human resource development particularly of retention of medical doctors and public health personals; and training of health and medical staffs.
5. To improve health care access and resources in Tibetan settlements in remote areas from Ladakh Changthang to North East India and to Nepal including rational, feasibility and need based implementation of telemedicine clinic project in remote Tibetan refugee settlements in India.
