= Tsering =

- Gender: Unisex

Origin
- Meaning: Long life

Tsering may be a surname or a given name. It is a Tibetan name that means "long life".

== Given name ==
- Tsering Chungtak (1984–2016), Tibetan model
- Tsering Wangmo Dhompa (born 1969), American poet
- Tsering Dolma (1919–1964), Tibetan politician
- Tsering Dhondup (1960–2025), Tibetan politician
- Tsering Döndrup, Tibetan author
- Tsering Dorjee (born 1970), Tibetan actor
- Tsering Dolma Gyaltong (1930–2018), Tibetan spiritual leader
- Tsering Hannaford, Australian artist
- Tsering Yangzom Lama, Tibetan novelist
- Tsering Lhamu Lama, Nepalese politician
- Tsering Landol, Indian gynecologist
- Tsering Lhamu, Indian politician
- Tsering Samphel (born 1948), Indian politician
- Tsering Shakya (born 1959), Tibetan scholar
- Tsering Rhitar Sherpa (born 1968), Nepalese film director
- Tsering Tashi, Indian politician
- Tsering Wangchuk (born 1974), Tibetan politician and physician
- Tsering Wangyal (1949–2000), Tibetan editor
- Tsering Wangmo Satho (born 1967), Tibetan dancer and opera singer
- Tsering Woeser (born 1966), Tibetan writer and activist

== Surname ==
- Acharya Nyima Tsering (1963–2011), Tibetan writer
- Ang Tsering (1905–2002), Nepali mountaineer
- Choenyi Tsering (born 1986), Chinese actress and singer
- Chope Paljor Tsering (1948–2026), Tibetan politician
- Dawa Tsering, Bhutanese politician
- Diki Tsering (1901–1981), Mother of the 14th Dalai Lama
- Jampa Tsering, Chinese singer and dancer
- Lhasang Tsering (1952–2026), Tibetan poet, writer and activist
- Namgey Tsering, Indian politician
- Penpa Tsering (born 1967), Tibetan politician
- Phurpa Tsering, Indian politician
- Tashi Tsering (educator) (1929–2014), Tibetan educator, writer, and editor
- Tashi Tsering (Australian Geshe) (born 1937), Tibetan Buddhist teacher
- Tashi Tsering (Jamyang Buddhist Centre) (born 1958), Tibetan Buddhist teacher, abbot of Sera Mey Monastic University
- Tashi Tsering (tibetologist) (born 1960), tibetologist, historian, and writer
- Tashi Tsering (footballer) (born 1973), Tibetan and Nepalese footballer
- Tempa Tsering (born 1950), Tibetan politician
