= 2011 Central Tibetan Administration general election =

- March 20, 2011
- Turnout: 58.97%
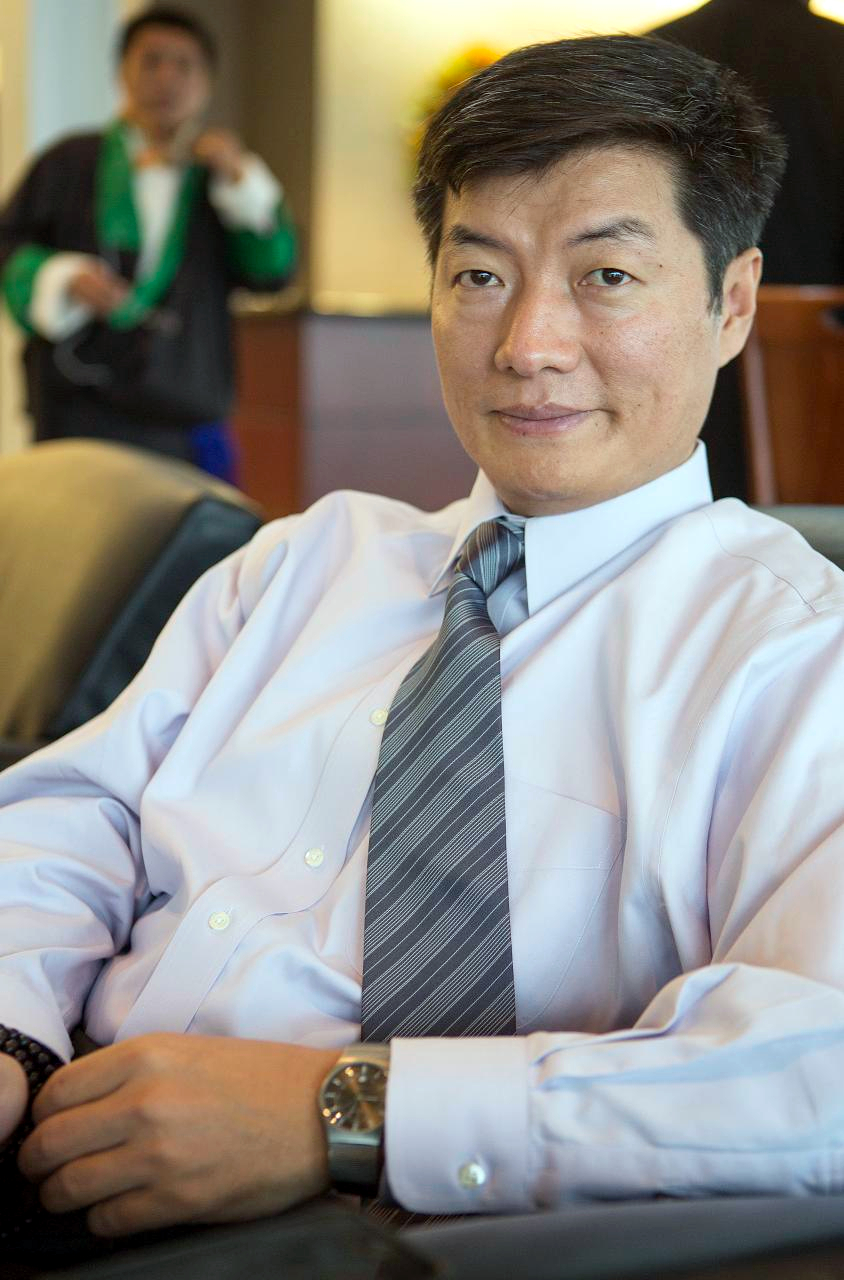

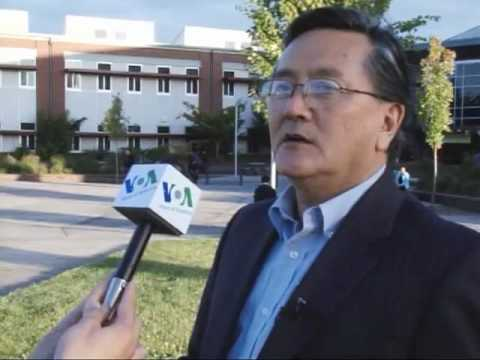

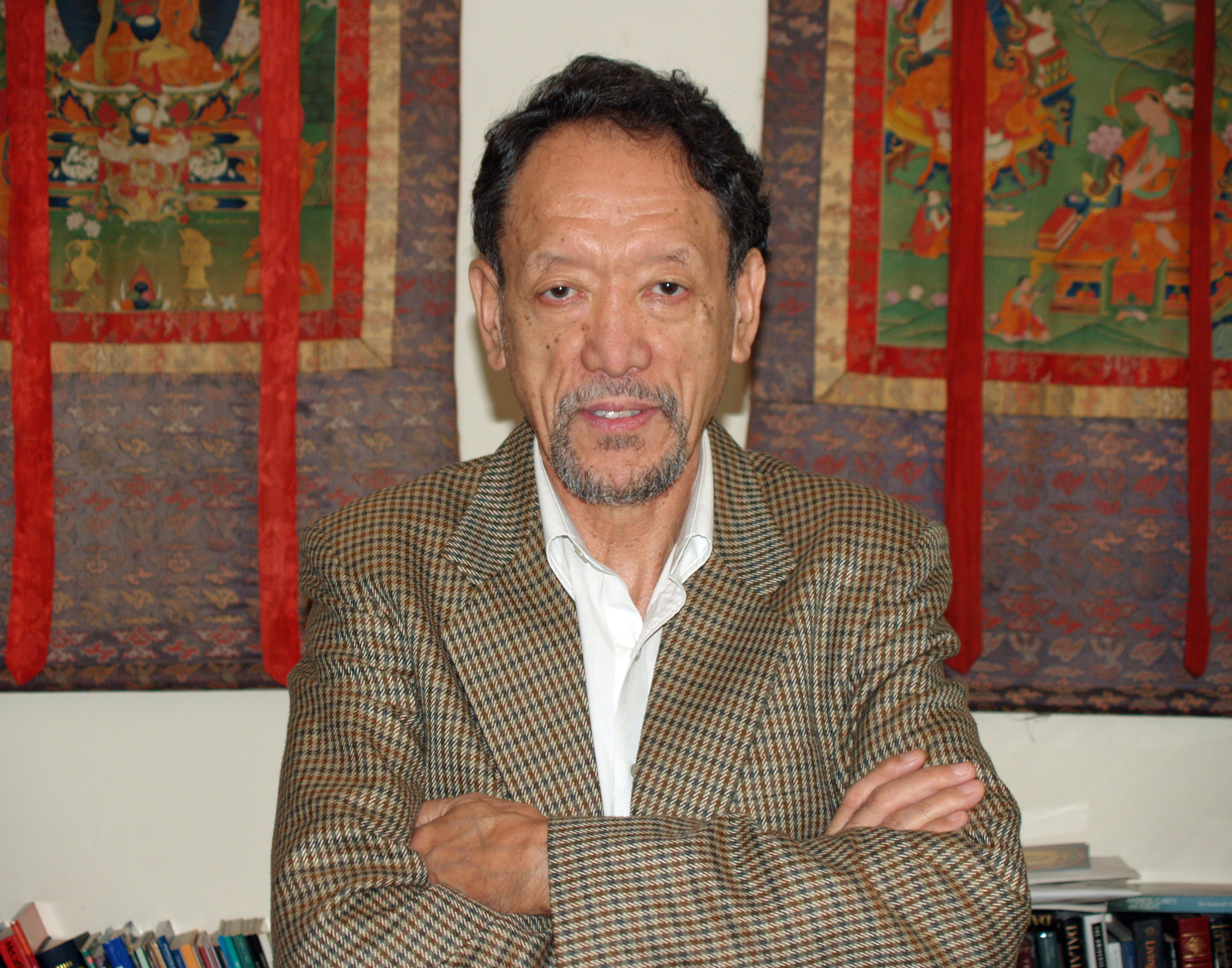
| Candidate | Lobsang Sangay | Tenzin Tethong | Tashi Wangdi |
| Party | Independent | Independent | Independent |
| Popular vote | 22,489 | 12,319 | 2,101 |
| Percentage | 55% | 37% | 6% |
Kalon Tripa before election
Lobsang Tenzin
Independent
Elected Kalon Tripa
Lobsang Sangay
Independent

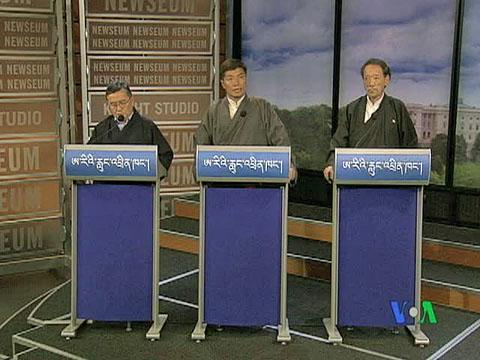
Tenzin Namgyal Tethong, Lobsang Sangay, and Tashi Wangdi face off in Washington for an internationally televised debate, March 1, 2011

The Central Tibetan Administration’s general elections were held for the second time on March 20, 2011 to elect the Kalon Tripa of the Tibetan government in exile. This was the third time Tibetans in exile were able to choose their Prime Minister as the office was traditionally appointed by the Dalai Lama. Elections for the 43 Chitue (members) of the Tibetan Parliament in Dharamshala were also held. Some 49,000 of the 83,000 Tibetans registered to vote took part in the election.

This election was of particularly importance due to the Dalai Lama’s announcement months before that he was going to withdraw from every political position and therefore the Kalon Tripa will hold full political representation of the Tibetan people in exile.

Human rights scholar and lawyer Lobsang Sangay won the election with 55% of the votes cast. His most immediate rival was former Kalon Tripa Tenzin Tethong who earned 37% percent. The other candidates acknowledge Sangay's victory and he was also congratulated by the Dalai Lama and other important figures of the Tibetan diaspora.
