= Tsering Dhondup =

Tibetan politician

- ཚེ་རིང་དོན་གྲུབ
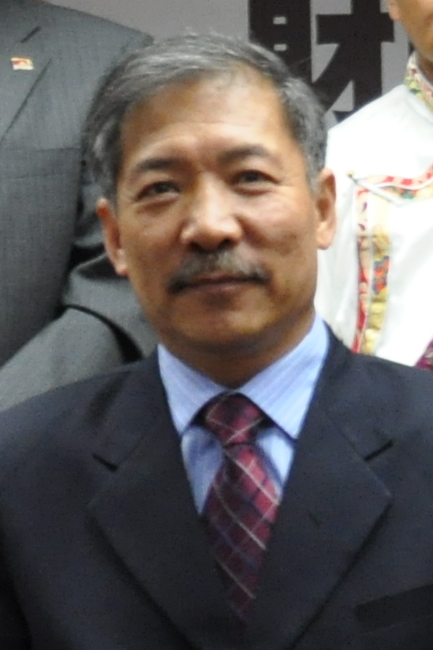
- Dhondup in 2013

Minister of Finance of the Central Tibetan Administration

Personal details
- Born: 1960
- Died: 7 September 2025 (aged 65) Dharamshala, Himachal Pradesh, India
- Education: Panjab University; Himachal Pradesh University; University of Montana

Tsering Dhondup (Tibetan: ཚེ་རིང་དོན་གྲུབ; 1960 – 7 September 2025), also known as Tsering Dhundup Yangdhar, was a Tibetan politician who was the Minister of Finance of the Tibetan-government-in-exile, officially known as Central Tibetan Administration (CTA).

== Life and career ==
Dhondup was born in 1960 during his parents' escape to exile from Tibet after 1959 Tibetan uprising.

He attended school at the Tibetan Homes Foundation and Central School for Tibetans, Mussoorie in 1981. He obtained Bachelor of Commerce degree at Panjab University, Chandigarh, in 1983. During this period, he was the President of the Tibetan Freedom Movement in Chandigarh.

Dhondup joined and worked for the Central Tibetan Administration in December 1984. He obtained a master's degree in Commerce at Himachal Pradesh University in 1993. In fall 1993 with a Fulbright Scholarship, he studied Business Management for one year at the University of Montana, United States.

He returned to India in October 1994, where he continued to work for the Central Tibetan Administration. He was Secretary of the Department of Education in 2000, and Department of Home in 2002, until October 2007 when his nomination as a Minister was approved by the 14th Tibetan Parliament in Exile.

From 2007 to 2011, he was Minister of Finance in the 13th Kashag, directed by Prime Minister Samdhong Rinpoche.

Dhondup was reelected as Minister of Finance in the 14th Kashag, directed by Prime Minister Lobsang Sangay.

Dhondup died in Dharamshala on 7 September 2025, at the age of 65.
