= 2006 Central Tibetan Administration general election =

- June 3, 2006
- Registered: 32,205
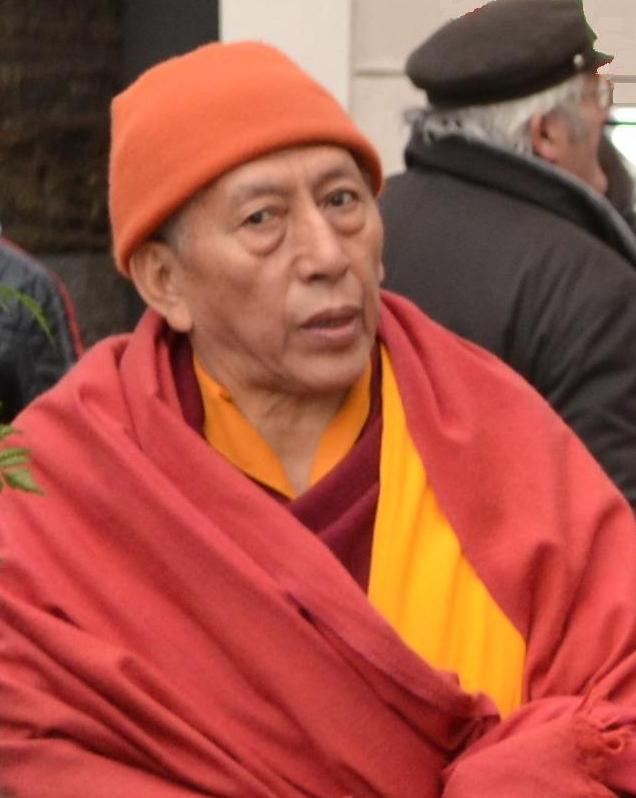

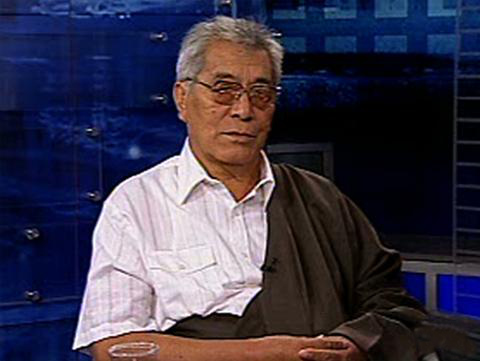
| Candidate | Lobsang Tenzin | Juchen Thubten Namgyal |
| Party | Independent | Independent |
| Popular vote | 29,216 | 2,989 |
| Percentage | 90.72% | 9% |
Kalon Tripa before election
Lobsang Tenzin
Independent
Elected Kalon Tripa
Lobsang Tenzin
Independent

General elections for Kalon Tripa (Prime Minister) of the Tibetan government in exile and members of the Parliament of the Central Tibetan Administration were held on June 3, 2006, by members of the Tibetan diaspora. The election took place, as usual, after a preliminary election held on March 18, 2005. The original election's date was postponed as requested from the community on India because this was settled originally for December 22, 2005, because many voters depended on winter tourism. The process was organized by the Tibetan Electoral Commission. Then incumbent Kalon Tripa Lobsang Tenzin won the election with more than 90% of the votes cast over former Kalon (Minister) Juchen Thubten Namgyal.
