= Tibetan Government =

Tibetan Government may refer to:

Currently governing Tibet:

- Government of Tibet Autonomous Region, an autonomous region in the People's Republic of China

In exile:

- Central Tibetan Administration, commonly known as the Tibetan Government-in-exile, headed by the 14th Dalai Lama and Prime Minister Lobsang Sangay

Historically:

- Ganden Phodrang, the government in Tibet from 1642 until the 1950s under the leadership of the Dalai Lamas or regent, or the Kashag, the governing council.
- Any of the various other regimes which were dominant in Tibet prior to 1642, beginning with the Tibetan Empire.
