= Wangdi =

Wangdi may refer to:

- Wangdue Phodrang District (ru), a place in Bhutan
- Tashi Wangdi (1947–2025), Tibetan diplomat and politician
- Tenzing Norgay, born Namgyal Wangdi, a Nepalese Sherpa mountaineer
