= Tibetan Centre for Human Rights and Democracy =

Tibetan human rights non-governmental organization

- Type: Non-profit NGO
- Location: Dharamsala, Himachal Pradesh, India
- Key people: Lobsang Nyandak
- Website: tchrd.org

The Tibetan Centre for Human Rights and Democracy (TCHRD) is a Tibetan non-governmental nonprofit human rights organization.

The TCHRD investigates and reports on human rights issues in Tibet and among Tibetan minorities throughout China. It is the first Tibetan non-governmental human rights organization to be established in exile in India. The TCHRD publishes articles on censorship and discrimination faced by Tibetans in Tibet; keeps databases on Tibetan political prisoners in China, Tibetans who have self-immolated, and Tibetans who have died in detention; and publishes reports and yearly human rights updates. The TCHRD has emphasized that an "important source of support for the Tibetan people comes from the Chinese community from both within and outside China."

Lobsang Nyandak, President of the Tibet Fund and former Representative to the Americas for the Dalai Lama, was the founding executive director.

== See also ==
- 1959 Tibetan uprising
- 1987–1989 Tibetan unrest
- 2008 Tibetan unrest
- Panchen Lama
- Palden Gyatso
- Tibetans in exile
- Human rights in Tibet
- Human rights in China
- Laogai criminal justice system, abbreviation of Láodòng Gǎizào (劳动改造), reform through labor penal labor and prison farms
- Labour camps in Tibet
- Drapchi Prison
- "China and Tibet | World". Human Rights Watch.
- 1987–1989 Tibetan unrest
- 2008 Lhasa violence
- 2010 Tibetan language protest
- International reactions to 2008 Tibetan protests
- List of prisons in the Tibet Autonomous Region
- Nangpa La shooting incident
- Protests and uprisings in Tibet since 1950
- Sinicization of Tibet
- Tibetan sovereignty debate
- Hacking of Dalai Lama's emails led to discovery by Canadians of embassy hacking worldwide by Chinese government spy networks.
