= Sonam Topgyal =

Prime Minister of Tibet

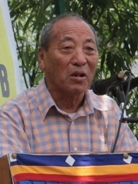
- Sonam Topgyal in 2015

Prime Minister of the Central Tibetan Administration
- In office 1996–2001
- Monarch: Tenzin Gyatso
- Preceded by: Tenzin Tethong
- Succeeded by: Lobsang Tenzin

Personal details
- Born: 1940 Dagyab, Kham, Tibet
- Died: 30 December 2012 (aged 71–72) Dharamshala, Himachal Pradesh, India

Sonam Topgyal (Tibetan: བསོད་ནམས་སྟོབས་རྒྱལ, 1940 – 30 December 2012) was Prime Minister (officially Kalön Tripa) of the Central Tibetan Administration (Tibetan government-in-exile). He held the position from 1996 to 2001.

Political offices
| Preceded by Tenzin Tethong | Prime Minister of the Central Tibetan Administration; 1996–2001 | Succeeded by Lobsang Tenzin |
