= Tibetan Refugee Self-Help Centre =

Rehabilitation centre in Darjeeling, India

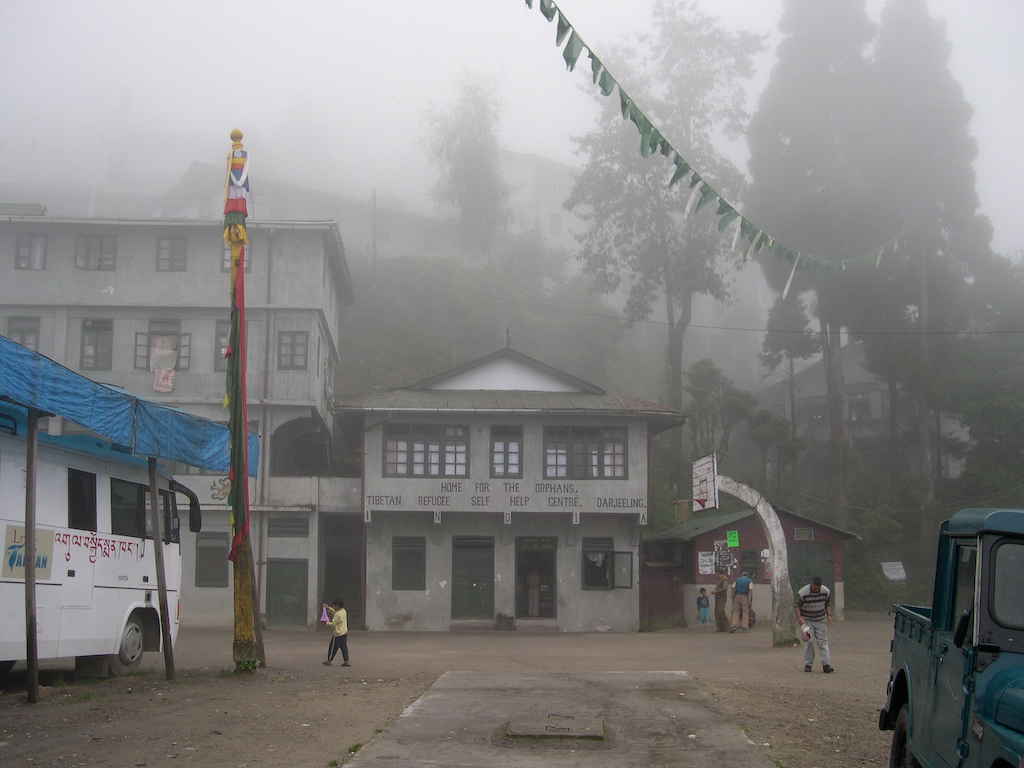
Tibetan Refugee Self Help Centre

Tibetan Refugee Self-Help Centre in Darjeeling, India, is a rehabilitation centre for Tibetan refugees in the Darjeeling Himalayan hill region. It was established on 2 October 1959, following the Dalai Lama's escape from Tibet. The production of Tibetan handicrafts is the centre's main activity.

== Location ==
It is located on the hillside of Lebong in the Darjeeling District of West Bengal. The altitude is approximately 2,143 m (7,031 ft) above sea level. The temperature variation ranges from 17°-1.5 °C, accompanied by an annual rainfall of 3,200 mm (130 in).

== History ==
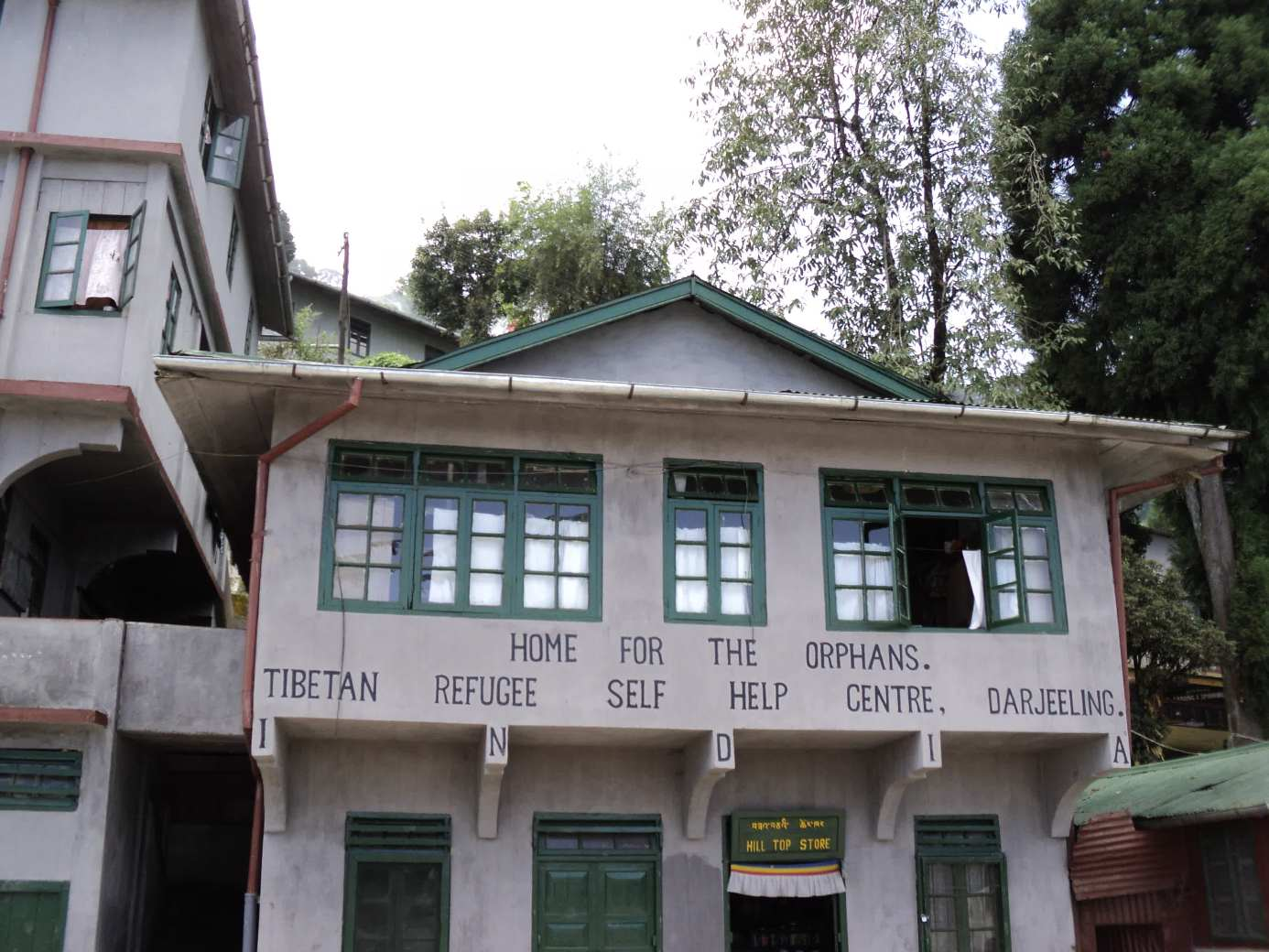
The Hill Top Shop in Darjeeling, India.

Situated in Lebong and locally known as Hermitage, the Tibetan Refugee Self-Help Centre (TRSHC) came into existence on 2 October 1959. In 1959, funds raised from a local charity led to the establishment of this centre by Zhu Dan (wife of Gyalo Thondup). The place initially provided emergency relief to Tibetan refugees who had trekked through the hazardous Himalayas into India. The Hillside had special significance for Tibetans because the Thirteenth Dalai Lama had spent his exile in India from 1910 to 1912 following the Chinese invasion of Tibet at that time.

"It was within this view that a ten-member committee was formed in Darjeeling to organise a rehabilitation centre to be known as the TIBETAN REFUGEE SELF-HELP CENTRE. The founding members of the committee were: Mrs. Gyalo Thondup, President, Mr. T. Lawang, Mr. G. Tesur, Mr. Tenzing Norgay, Mr & Mrs. Joksari, Mr. T. Tethong, Monsignor Benjamin, Mr. Chumbay Tsering and Miss Tesur. Later, we had the pleasure of welcoming the following new members into the committee: Mrs. Laden-la, Col. & Mrs. Thapa and Mr. Dilip Bose."

The centre was registered as a charitable organization under the Government of India Act. Starting with just four workers, today the centre is home to 130 Tibetan families. The centre has been involved in a range of multifaceted activities, which include handicrafts and the training of artisans and craftsmen. These activities primarily focus on caring for the sick, the elderly, and the needy destitute. The centre now comprises one crèche, one nursery school, and a pre-primary school (up to +2 standard).

- Started on 1 October 1959
- Production of handicrafts is the centre's main activity
- In June 1960, the Centre started a small Nursery School
