= Tenzin Tethong =

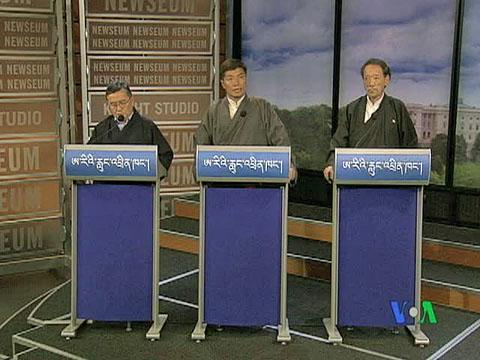
Tenzin Namgyal Tethong, Lobsang Sangay, and Tashi Wangdi (left to right) – face off in Washington, D.C. for an internationally televised election debate for the Prime Minister or Kalon Tripa, March 1, 2011

Tethong Tenzin Namgyal (Tibetan: བཀྲས་མཐོང་བསྟན་འཛིན་རྣམ་རྒྱལ་ born 1947) is a Tibetan politician and a former Prime Minister (Kalon Tripa) of Central Tibetan Administration.

== Naming practice ==
Traditionally, ordinary Tibetan people carry a first personal name and may or may not carry a second personal name, but does have a family name which is known as Tethong. Tenzin Namgyal Tethong is a special case where he is of aristocratic descent from the area called Tashi Thongmon, which is abbreviated as Te-Thong. When a person carries a family name, it should come in the very beginning. When the names are translated into English, they have adopted European grammatical practice of placing the family name at the end.

== Early life ==
Tenzin Tethong started his exile life when he accompanied his family to Mussoorie in 1959 where the Dalai Lama, months after his arrival from Tibet, had started a school. His father was a teacher, and because of a shortage of anyone with knowledge of languages other than Tibetan, Tenzin Tethong and his older brother helped out in many ways. In 1960 when the first children from the road camps and border areas came to Mussoorie he was a part-time English teacher for young children his age and also their fellow student in the next Tibetan class. The following year he went to Shimla where his father was appointed the Principal of the second Tibetan refugee school. In 1962 his family moved back to Darjeeling where he completed his high school education at Mt. Hermon School graduating with a First Division as a Science Student.

== Public Service career ==
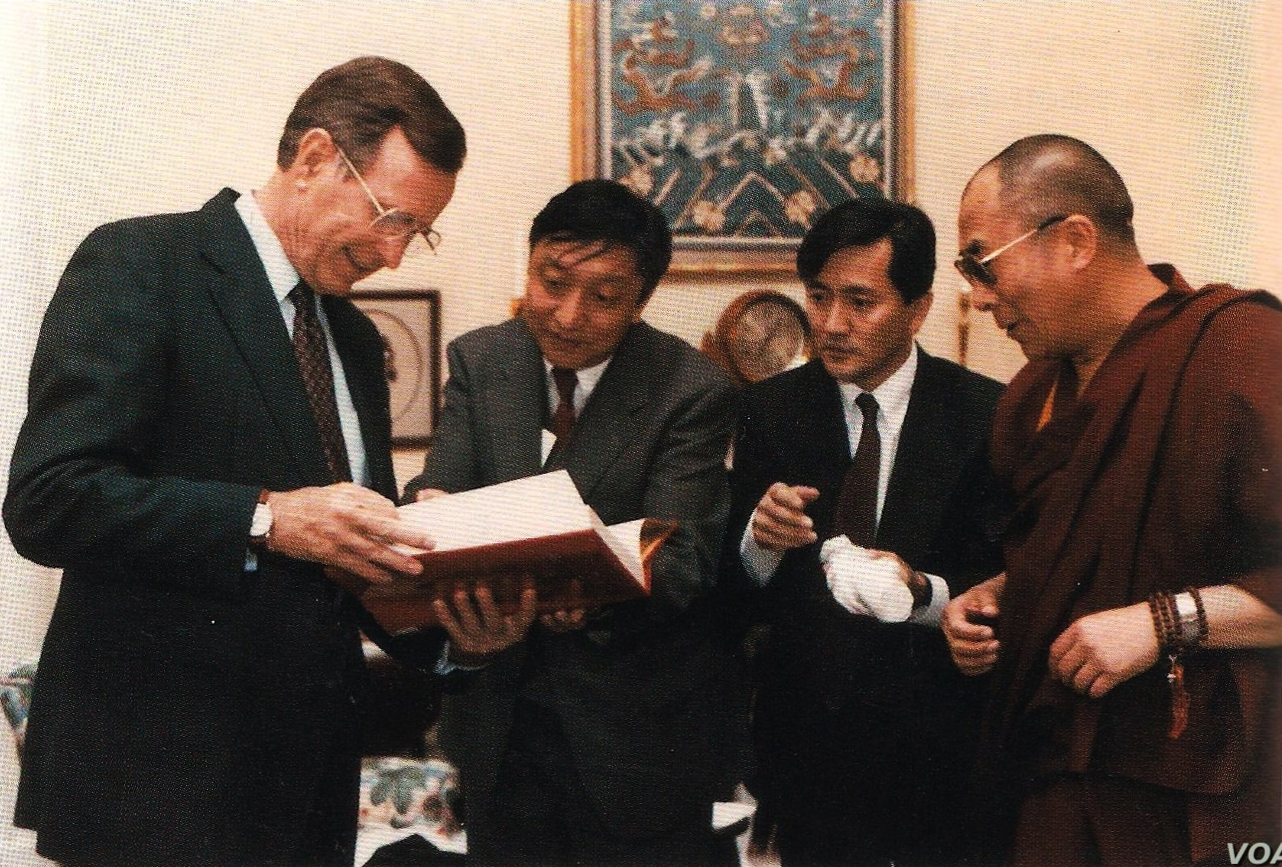
Tenzin Gyatso, the 14th Dalai Lama of Tibet on 16 April 1991 with President George H. W. Bush, Lodi Gyari and Tenzin Tethong

Tenzin N Tethong began his public service career in 1967.

- 1967–1968: Secretary and translator for the Department of Education
- 1973–1986: Representative of the Dalai Lama in New York
- 1980: Headed the Second Delegation of Tibetans to Tibet and China
- 1987–1990: Special Representative of the Dalai Lama in Washington DC
- 1990: One of the first Kalons elected
- 1990–1995: Served as Kalon Tripa (Chief of Cabinet) and Kalon of various portfolios such as Departments of Finance, Home and Information & International Relations
- 2013–present Appointed Director of Tibetan language section of the Radio Free Asia.

== Social entrepreneurial and political initiatives ==
- 1968: With his brother Tenzin Geyche and friend Sonam Topgyal, Tenzin Tethong started Sheja, the first educational publication in exile, the first Tibetan Non-Governmental initiative. Sheja became a successful and popular publication. While still working with Sheja, Tenzin Tethong also edited and published the Tibetan Review from January–June 1972 with Tamdin D. Gyalpo as Executive Editor. Both publications became part of the information office of the Tibetan government in exile in 1971.
- 1970: He was one of the four convenors of the first Tibetan youth conference in Dharmsala, along with Tenzin Geyche, Sonam Topgyal, Gyari Rinpoche. This conference resulted in the formation of the Tibetan Youth Congress. He served on its first leadership executive committee. Since then the Tibetan Youth Congress has become one of the most important Tibetan organizations in exile and has a worldwide membership of some 30,000.
- 1973–1986: He was also instrumental in the formation of several Tibetan initiatives in North America such US Tibet Committee, Tibetan Associations across the US, and Tibet House. At this time he also worked with Congressmen Charlie Rose and other senior staff in the US government to secure the first visit of the Dalai Lama to the United States in 1979.
- 1987: During the Dalai Lama’s visit to Washington, when he gave his Five Point Peace plan at the Congressional Human Rights Caucus, he was instructed to stay behind and keep up with the support and interest many members of Congress had for Tibet. As the Special Representative of the Dalai Lama in Washington DC, he would not have been able to achieve much with the limited resources of the Tibetan government. So he took the initiative to establish the International Campaign for Tibet (ICT) as a way to be able to have a real presence which works to promote human rights and democratic freedoms for the people of Tibet while working with the US Government and the European Parliament.
- 1987–1990: With the help of dedicated staffers and US Congressional Representatives who support Tibet, he helped to initiate and played a critical role in securing the first 1,000 visas for Tibetans to immigrate the United States, Fulbright scholarship program support for Tibetan students and the creation of Voice of America’s Tibetan language service.
- 1995: He resigned from government service for personal reasons and moved to the United States. That year, he became the Principal Advisor to the film Seven Years in Tibet and helped the Screenplay writer and the Director with the contents of the story, and advised on the artistic aspects of the film production adding greatly to the authenticity of the Tibetan scenes, dialogue, body language and the overall story of Tibet as depicted in the film.
- 1996: He was invited as a Visiting Scholar to teach in the History Department of Stanford University. He taught a course in Tibetan history and contemporary politics, and since was followed by teaching sessions for the Stanford University summer session and Continuing Studies programs. He is a Distinguished Fellow of the Tibetan Studies Initiative and Chair of the Tibetan Studies Committee working to establish research and teaching positions at Stanford University.

He also worked actively with Stanford scientists and scholars to organize two visits by the Dalai Lama which became important dialogues between Buddhism and Science. These dialogues and subsequent conferences resulted in the establishment of CCARE, Center for Compassion and Altruism Research and Education. These efforts further the work of the Dalai Lama who has been encouraged scientists to work closely with Buddhist experts and practitioners whose knowledge of the mind and consciousness may have valuable contributions to make to science and society. Tethong is a member of the Executive Committee of CCARE along with Geshe Thupten JInpa, another important member who visits Stanford regularly.

- 2002: Tenzin Tethong was one of the key founding members of The Dalai Lama Foundation, established by students and friends of the Dalai Lama. The founding members decided to work on the Dalai Lama's message of ethics and peace as outlined in his book Ethics for the New Millennium.

The DLF started with an initial study guide of "Ethics for the New Millennium" which has been translated into French, Chinese, Portuguese, German, Spanish, Japanese and Hebrew and it has resulted in hundreds of Study Circles all over the world. The guide has also been downloaded over 30,000 times. Other online courses and educational materials related to peace are available at the foundation website. The Dalai Lama Foundation also works to develop close relations with other organizations that are engaged in the Dalai Lama's work for peace in the world, and collaborates with a number of organizations bearing the Dalai Lama's name; The Foundation for Universal Responsibility of the Dalai Lama in New Delhi, The Dalai Lama Center for Peace Education in Vancouver, Canada, and The Dalai Lama Center for Ethics at the Massachusetts Institute of Technology in Boston.

== Current roles ==
Currently, Tenzin Tethong, a Distinguished Fellow at the Tibetan Studies Initiative, Stanford University (a program he played a key role in establishing) is the President of the Dalai Lama Foundation, and Board Chair of the Committee of 100 for Tibet. In addition to serving as an advisor to the local Tibetan Community Center project, he is co-founder of the Missing Peace art exhibit and recently launched "Tibet in Exile-Fifty Years", an online documentation effort to commemorate the last fifty years in exile of the Dalai Lama and the Tibetan people.

Political offices
Preceded by Gyalo Thondup	Prime Minister of the Central Tibetan Administration; 1993-1996	Succeeded by Sonam Topgyal
