= Chope Paljor Tsering =

Tibetan politician (1948–2026)

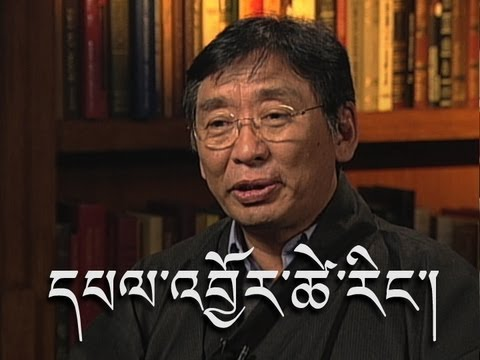

Chope Paljor Tsering (Tibetan: དཔལ་འབྱོར་ཚེ་རིང; 1948 – June 11, 2026) was a Tibetan politician who was a member of the cabinet of the Central Tibetan Administration. He was the longest serving representative of the Dalai Lama, having served as the representative to Nepal, Eastern Europe, Australasia and East Asia over 21 years from 1986 until 2007.

== Early life and career ==
Chope Paljor Tsering was born in gNam-ru, northern Tibet, to a traditional Tibetan nomadic family in 1948. He became a refugee in Nepal in 1959 after his family fled Tibet after China’s People’s Liberation Army invaded their homeland. After completing his education he was appointed deputy secretary in the Central Tibetan Administration and was posted to take charge of a remote Tibetan refugee settlement in western Nepal from October 1973.

He subsequently served in the Central Tibetan Administration in numerous capacities. He was the longest serving representative of the Dalai Lama, being first appointed in Nepal, in May 1986 and remaining in office for the next twenty one years until his formal retirement from public service in 2007. During that period Chope Paljor Tsering represented the Dalai Lama in Eastern Europe, Australasia and East Asia.

Tsering took his oath of office as a cabinet member of the 13th Kashag from the Dalai Lama in New Delhi on 24 November 2007 and was appointed the Kalon for the department of health in the Central Tibetan Administration. During his tenure as the Kalon for health, he was credited with initiating innovative healthcare related systems for the Tibetan refugees in India, including the Tibetan Medicare System (TMS), Telemedicine service and the Health Information System (HIS).

He was the author of "The Nature of All Things", an autobiography which recounts his childhood in Tibet, life as a refugee and his experiences in serving the Dalai Lama and Tibetan people.

After the completion of the term of the 13th Kashag in August 2011 to his death in 2026, Chope Paljor Tsering lived in Australia with his wife and three children.

== Death ==
Tsering died in Australia on June 11, 2026.

== Publications ==
- The Nature of All Things: The Life Story of a Tibetan in Exile, Lothian Books, 2004, ISBN 0734407416, 9780734407412
