= Gyalo Thondup =

Brother of the 14th Dalai Lama (1928–2025)

- རྒྱལ་ལོ་དོན་འགྲུབ
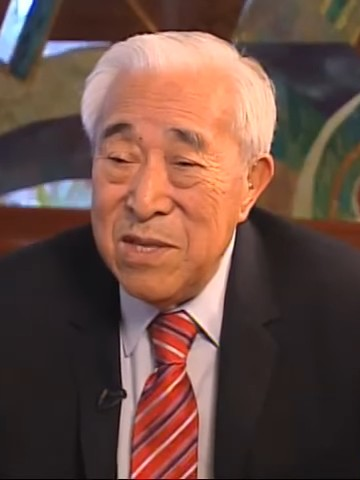
- Thondup in 2009
- Born: c. 1928; Taktser, Qinghai, China
- Died: February 8, 2025 (aged 96–97); Kalimpong, West Bengal, India
- Other name: 嘉乐顿珠
- Spouse: Zhu Dan (m. 1948; died 1986)
- Children: 3

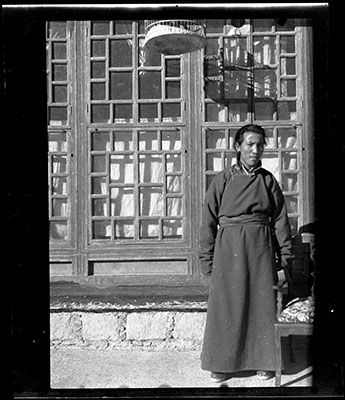
Gyalo Thondup in 1948 or 1949, standing in front of a large window of the Dalai Lama's family house, Yabshi Taktser, in Lhasa. He is wearing a woollen robe and felt boots.

Gyalo Thondup (Tibetan: རྒྱལ་ལོ་དོན་འགྲུབ, Wylie: rgyal lo don 'grub; Chinese: 嘉乐顿珠; pinyin: Jiālè Dùnzhū; c. 1928 – 8 February 2025) (Note: According to The Washington Post, his exact birth date is unknown. His book jacket lists his birth year as 1929. Other sources say 1928 or 1927.) was a Tibetan political operator in exile. The second-oldest brother of the 14th Dalai Lama, he was his closest advisor. From 1952 onward, he was based in India. Through the 1950s and 1960s, he worked with the Central Intelligence Agency of the United States during its unsuccessful campaign to use armed Tibetan rebels against China.

Thondup helped to negotiate the Dalai Lama's safe passage to India following his escape from Lhasa in 1959. After US support of the Tibetan resistance ended in the 1970s, he often acted as the Dalai Lama's unofficial envoy to China and attempted to negotiate his return.

His bestselling memoir, The Noodle Maker of Kalimpong: The Untold Story of My Struggle for Tibet, was published in 2015. Following his death in 2025, The Washington Post said Thondup was "arguably the second-most important figure in modern Tibetan history", viewed by many governments around the world as a de facto political leader of Tibet.

== Early life and education ==
Around 1928, Gyalo Thondup was born in the village of Taktser, Amdo (Ping'an District, Qinghai province). He was the third child of Choekyong Tsering and Diki Tsering. The second of five sons, he was their only male child who did not become a monk; his father had intended for him to become a farmer and carry on the family estate.

In 1939, he moved with his family to Lhasa after his younger brother Lhamo Thondup was recognised as the 14th Dalai Lama. As the family settled into its new position as the first family of Tibet, Thondup received training to become the lead advisor to the Dalai Lama. The Reting Rinpoche sent Gyalo to a private school for a traditional Tibetan education, and appointed Ma Bao, a Chinese Muslim, to tutor him in the Chinese language.

In 1942, at the age of 14, Thondup went to Nanjing, the capital of Republican China, to study Standard Chinese and the history of China. From April 1947 to the summer of 1949, he often visited Chiang Kai-shek at his home, ate at his family table, and was educated by tutors selected by Chiang himself. In 1948, he married Zhu Dan, the daughter of a Kuomintang general; she had a degree in social work.

== Political involvement ==
In 1949, before the Communist revolution of that year in China, Thondup left Nanjing for Tibet with his wife, who became known by the Tibetan name Diki Dolkar. After Chinese troops asserted control over Lhasa, Thondup fled by horseback to India in 1952.

Fluent in Chinese, Tibetan and English, in subsequent decades, Thondup traveled between New Delhi, Taipei, Washington, Hong Kong, and Beijing as an unofficial envoy.

=== Involvement with the Republic of China (ROC) ===
According to his personal memoir, Thondup was personally sponsored by Chiang Kai-shek to be a special student in one of Nanjing's top universities. After first meeting them in May 1946, he visited the Chiangs' home frequently, describing him and his wife Soong Meiling as "unfailingly warm and gracious hosts" who paid for all his expenses and treated him "as a son". Both Gyalo and his wife Zhu Dan (who had spent her time at a local Baptist hospital working with children and refugees traumatized after the Second Sino-Japanese War) left Nanjing in March 1949 as the mainland fell to the Communists.

Subsequently, the two of them joined Chiang Kai-shek and his government in exile on Taiwan for sixteen months, and Chiang gave Thondup a check of $50,000 to study abroad in the United States when he finally departed. Thondup and his wife then arrived in Washington D.C. at the end of October 1951, but Thondup decided to return to Lhasa shortly afterwards to better assist his people who were in the midst of social and political turmoil at the time.

After rebuffing the PRC's initial offers for him to lead the Tibetan youth delegation to Beijing, Thondup was labeled by Mao's government as a traitor and had his citizenship stripped, deemed worse than a "reactionary rebel", whereupon he fled to India with his family. From there, he contacted Chiang Kai-shek, who was the first to respond to him, telling him that the ROC was "prepared to contribute arms and money...to help the Tibetan cause". Although Gyalo said he "never refused the Nationalists' help outright", he eventually felt that accepting their aid directly would complicated Tibetan aspirations for a free and independent state, and also strengthen the PRC's persistent claims that the Tibetans were being used by the ROC to undermine its sovereignty.

After China and India's 1962 border war, the Indian intelligence chief Bhola Nath Mullik asked him to establish contact with the ROC government on Taiwan. Thondup secretly returned to Taiwan to visit the Chiangs one last time, with the Chiangs purportedly being "delighted" to see him and welcoming India's overture. After meeting Chiang Ching-kuo, Thondup traveled with deputy director Wang of Taiwan's national security to New Delhi and introduced him to Mullik, allegedly beginning a close but highly covert relationship between the Indian and Taiwanese intelligence services, one which allegedly lasts to the present day.

=== United States activities ===
In 1951, he traveled to America and became the main source of information on Tibet for the United States Department of State. The Central Intelligence Agency promised to make Tibet independent from China in exchange for Thondup's support in organizing guerrilla units to fight against the People's Liberation Army, an offer that Thondup accepted.

Thondup helped to recruit approximately 300 fighters to be trained at Camp Hale, Colorado, who in turn trained thousands of others in the Tibetan resistance. In the late 1950s and early 1960s, the CIA provided the resistance with an estimated 700,000 pounds of rifles, ammunition, grenades, and radio equipment, and airdropped them into Tibet, but their missions were unsuccessful.

In 1959, Thondup helped to orchestrate the Dalai Lama's safe passage to India after his escape from Tibet. Thondup maintained that he did not inform the 14th Dalai Lama about the CIA's actions, out of respect for his pacifist stance. To his disappointment, US support ended after the 1972 Nixon visit to China.

=== Later career ===
With the permission of the Dalai Lama, Thondup met Chinese leader Deng Xiaoping in 1979 for peaceful political talks, to negotiate terms for his brother's return to Tibet. Thondup terminated the discussions in 1993, feeling them to be useless. In the 1990s, Thondup made several official visits to China, acting as the Dalai Lama's unofficial envoy.

In recent years, Thondup urged Tibetans to remain politically engaged, repeatedly stating that dialogue was the only way to achieve progress with China. In 1998, the Central Tibetan Administration in exile criticized Thondup for not letting the Dalai Lama know about the CIA's involvement in Tibet. Over a decade later, Thondup accused his sister-in-law's father of embezzling money from the Central Tibetan Administration.

== Personal life and death ==
Thundap and his wife Diki Dolkar had a daughter, who died in the early 1980s, and two sons. His wife Dolkar died in 1986. In 2002, Thondup visited Lhasa briefly by invitation of the Chinese government. His wife helped establish the Tibetan Refugee Self-Help Centre in Darjeeling, which provided support for at least five hundred Tibetan refugees at any given time, where she worked until the day she died.

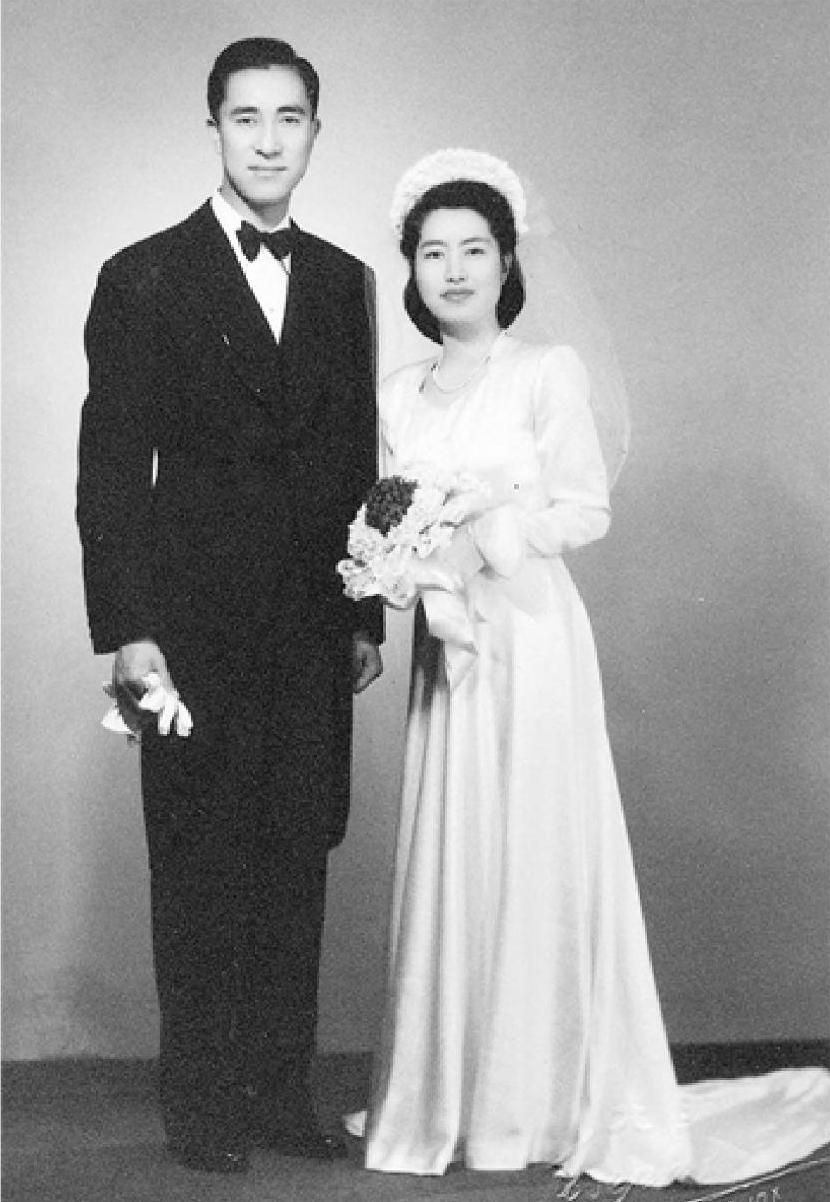
Gyalo and Zhu Dan at their wedding in Nanjing

In retirement, Thondup started a noodle factory in West Bengal, India. In 2015, he published his memoir, The Noodle Maker of Kalimpong: The Untold Story of My Struggle for Tibet, which became a bestseller.

Thondup died at his residence in Kalimpong, West Bengal, on 8 February 2025. (Note: The New York Times listed his age at death as "97".)

== Publications ==
- (with Anne F. Thurston), The Noodle Maker of Kalimpong: The Untold Story of the Dalai Lama and the Secret Struggle for Tibet, PublicAffairs, 2015

== See also ==
- 14th Dalai Lama
- Thubten Norbu

== Notes ==
Political offices
Preceded by Kalsang Yeshi	Prime Minister of the Central Tibetan Administration; 1991–1993	Succeeded by Tenzin Tethong
