= Kashag =

Governing council of Tibet from 1721 to 1959

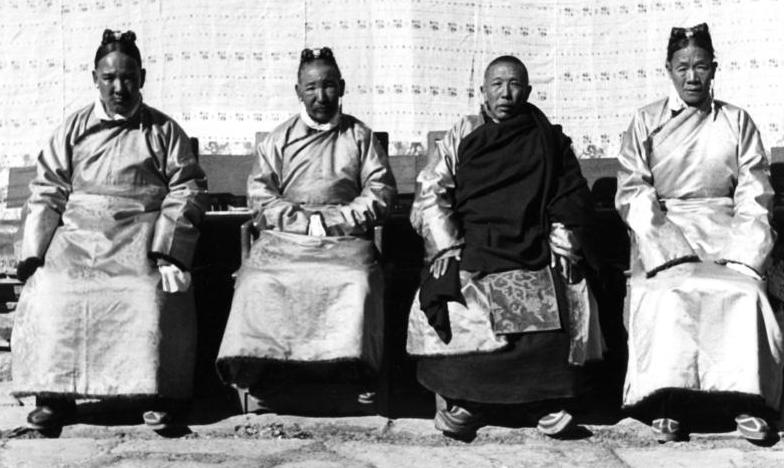
The four Kalöns of the Kashag in 1938–39

The Kashag (Tibetan: བཀའ་ཤག ་, Wylie: bkaʼ-shag, ZWPY: Gaxag, Lhasa dialect: [ˈkáɕaʔ]; Chinese: 噶廈; pinyin: Gáxià) was the governing council of Tibet during the rule of the Qing dynasty and post-Qing period until the 1950s. It was created in 1721, and set by Qianlong Emperor in 1751 for the Ganden Phodrang in the 13-Article Ordinance for the More Effective Governing of Tibet. In that year the Tibetan government was reorganized after the riots in Lhasa of the previous year. The civil administration was represented by the council (Kashag) after the post of Desi (or Regent; see: dual system of government) was abolished by the Qing imperial court. The Qing imperial court wanted the 7th Dalai Lama to hold both religious and administrative rule, while strengthening the position of the High Commissioners.

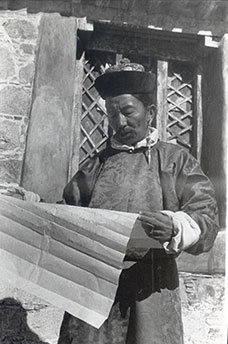
Norbu Dhondup in Lhasa, Tibet in 1937 with Tibetan government (Kashag) passport or Lamyig for the 1938 British Mount Everest Expedition

As specified by the 13-Article Ordinance for the More Effective Governing of Tibet, Kashag was composed of three temporal officials and one monk official. Each of them held the title of Kalön (Tibetan: བཀའ་བློན་, Wylie: bkaʼ-blon, Lhasa dialect: [kálø ̃]; Chinese: 噶倫; pinyin: gálún), sought appointment from the Qing imperial court, and the Qing imperial court issued certificates of appointment.

The function of the council was to decide government affairs collectively, and present opinions to the office of the first minister. The first minister then presented these opinions to the Dalai Lama and, during the Qing Dynasty the Amban, for a final decision. The privilege of presenting recommendations for appointing executive officials, governors and district commissioners gave the Council much power.

In August 1929, the Supreme Court of the Central Government stated that before the publication of new laws, laws in history regarding Tibet, regarding reincarnation of rinpoches, lamas were applicable.

On 28 March 1959, Zhou Enlai, the premier of the People's Republic of China (PRC), formally announced the dissolution of the Kashag.

== Function ==
Secular matters needed to go through the Kashag before reaching the Dalai Lama. Formal orders from the government needed the seal of the Kashag. The Kashag had no authority over monks, religion, or the monastic system as those issues were controlled by the chigyab khembo and Yigtsang Office.

Surkhang Shape estimated that during a six day work week in the 1940s around 100 pieces of business, accounting for 30% of the total, were sent to the Dalai Lama by the Kashag. The remaining pieces of business were dealt solely by the Kashag. The importance of the Kashag rose during times of regency, but was completely irrelevant under strong Dalai Lamas.

From 1900 to 1959, there were 41 shapes of the Kashag, 12 were monk officials and 29 were lay officials. The composition of lay officials was 72% high-status aristocrats, 14% were from lower-status wealthy families, and only one was from a poor family.

From 1913 to 1951, three types of a National Assembly were called upon by the Kashag for consultative purposes. The smallest of the three was the Eight Trunyichemmo and Tsipöns, which was composed of the four trunyichemmo of the Yigtsang Office and the four tsipöns of the Tsigang Office. The largest was the Full National Assembly (Tshongdu Gyentsom), which was composed of the trungtsigye, lay and monk officials present in Lhasa, captains and lieutenants of the army stationed in Lhasa, the tshopa who collected house and corvée taxes in Lhasa, 30 clerks, all of the abbots and ex-abbots of Ganden Monastery, Sera Monastery, and Drepung Monastery, and the representatives from Reting Monastery, Kundeling Monastery, Tshomöling Monastery, Tshechöling Monastery, Ditru Monastery, Tashi Lhunpo Monastery, Ganden Thri Rimpoche Monastery, and Sakya Monastery. The most commonly used form was the Abbreviated National Assembly (Tshongdu Hragdu), a body of 20—50 people made up of abbots and ex-abbots from the three main Gelug monasteries and government officials selected by the Kashag and Yigtsang Office.

== Ministries ==
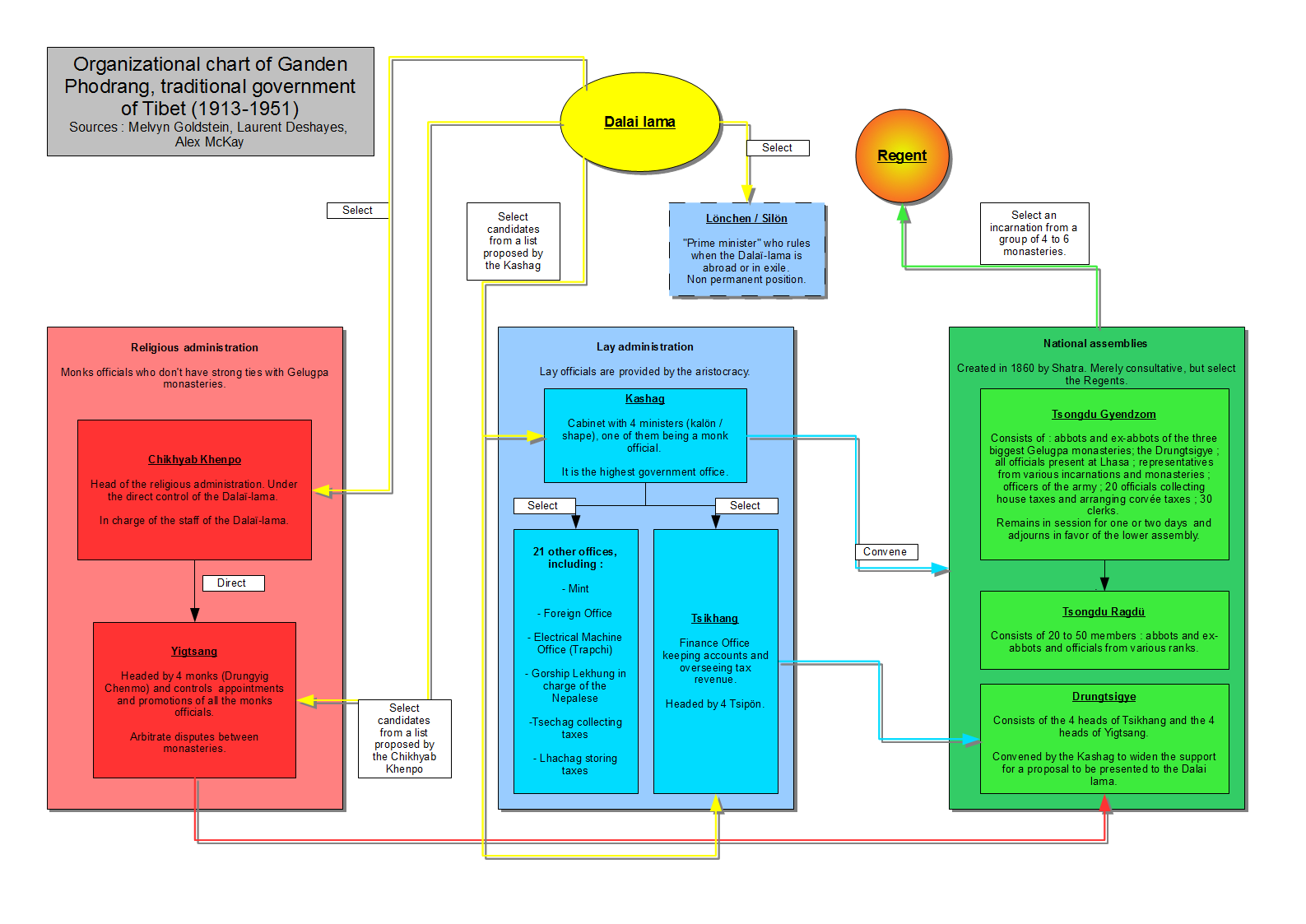
Organizational chart of Ganden Phodrang

Headed by the council was the government administration, divided into ministries: political, military, economic, judicial, foreign, financial and educational departments. Except for the Ministry of Finance (Tibetan: རྩིས་ཁང་, Wylie: rtsis-khang, Lhasa dialect: [tsíkaŋ]; Chinese: 商上; pinyin: shāngshàng), all ministries had two representatives – one temporal and one monastic. The Ministry of Finance had three lay officials. Each of them held the title of Tsipön (Tibetan: རྩིས་དཔོན་, Wylie: rtsis-dpon, Lhasa dialect: [tsípø ̃]; Chinese: 仔琫; pinyin: zīběng). All ministries had a right to make decisions to the extent of their competence. Matters, or problems outside the competence of ministries were (with a particular ministry's given opinion) presented to the council. Everything outside the competence of the council was presented to the Dalai Lama himself.

== In Constitution of Tibet (10 March 1963 – 13 June 1991) ==
On 29 April 1959, the 14th Dalai Lama re-established the Kashag. In 1963, the 14th Dalai Lama promulgated the Constitution of Tibet, and he became Head of State of Tibet. All ministers of Kashag were appointed by the Dalai Lama.

== In the Charter of Tibetans in Exile (14 June 1991 – 14 March 2011) ==
In 1974, the 14th Dalai Lama rejected calls for Tibetan independence. In 1991, the Charter of Tibetans in Exile was created, and the Dalai Lama became head of the Tibetan Administration and the executive for Tibetans-in-exile. The Kashag was recreated, consisting of a Chief Kalon and seven Kalons.

== In the Charter of Tibetans in Exile (29 May 2011 – present) ==
In March 2011, the Dalai Lama decided to no longer assume any political and administrative authority. The Charter of Tibetans in Exile was updated in May 2011 to reflect the changes, with the Kashag consisting of Sikyong and no more than seven Kalons.

Notable past members of the Cabinet include Gyalo Thondup, the Dalai Lama's eldest brother, who served as Chairman of the Cabinet and as Kalon of Security, and Jetsun Pema, the Dalai Lama's younger sister, who served variously as Kalon of Health and of Education.

- Penpa Tsering – Sikyong
- Penpa Tsering – Acting Kalon for Home
- Penpa Tsering – Acting Kalon for Religion & Culture
- Norzin Dolma – Kalon for Information & International Relations
- Kalon Tharlam Dolma Changra – Kalon for Education
- Dolma Gyari – Kalon for Security
- Penpa Tsering – Acting Kalon for Finance
- Penpa Tsering – Acting Kalon for Health

== See also ==
- Ganden Phodrang
- Chinese expedition to Tibet (1720)
- Tibet under Qing rule
- Dual system of government

== Works cited ==
- Goldstein, Melvyn (1989). A History of Modern Tibet, 1913-1951: The Demise of the Lamaist State. University of California Press. ISBN 0520061403.
