= Lobsang Sangay =

Sikyong of the Tibetan Government in Exile

- བློ་བཟང་སེང་གེ་
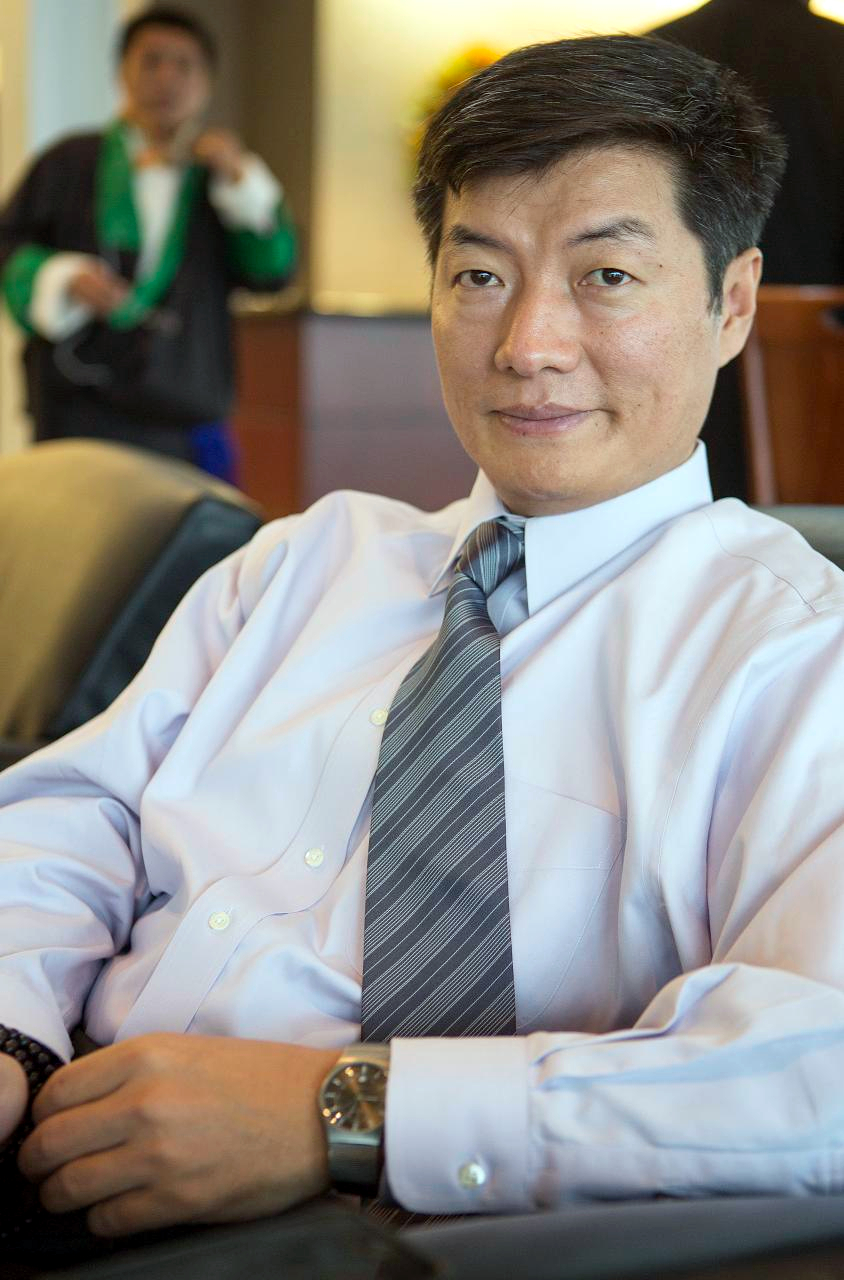
- Sangay in 2012

1st Sikyong of the Central Tibetan Administration
- In office 20 September 2012 – 27 May 2021
- Succeeded by: Penpa Tsering

13th Kalon Tripa
- In office 8 August 2011 – 20 September 2012
- Preceded by: Lobsang Tenzin
- Succeeded by: Office abolished

Foreign Minister of the Tibetan Administration in Exile
- Incumbent
- Assumed office 28 February 2016
- Preceded by: Dicki Chhoyang

Personal details
- Born: 5 September 1968 (age 58) Darjeeling, West Bengal, India
- Citizenship: American
- Party: National Democratic Party of Tibet
- Children: 1
- Education: University of Delhi (BA, LLB); Harvard University (LLM, SJD)

- Lobsang Sangay

Tibetan name
- Tibetan: བློ་བཟང་སེང་གེ་
Transcriptions
- Wylie: blo-bzang seng-ge
- Lhasa IPA: Tibetan pronunciation: [ˈlópsaŋ ˈséŋke]

Chinese name
- Chinese: 洛桑森格
Transcriptions
Standard Mandarin
- Hanyu Pinyin: Luòsāng Sēngé

Lobsang Sangay (Tibetan: བློ་བཟང་སེང་གེ་, lit. 'kind-hearted lion'; born 5 September 1968) is a Tibetan-American politician in exile who was Kalon Tripa of the Tibetan Administration in India from 2011 to 2012, and Sikyong of the Central Tibetan Administration in India from 2012 to 2021.

The Tibetan Administration was created in 1991 after the 14th Dalai Lama rejected calls for Tibetan independence. The 14th Dalai Lama became permanent head of the Tibetan Administration and the executive functions for Tibetans-in-exile in 1991. In March 2011, at 75 years of age, the 14th Dalai Lama decided not to assume any political and administrative authority. The Charter of Tibetans in Exile was updated immediately in May 2011, and all articles related to political duties and regents of the 14th Dalai Lama were repealed.

Sangay was born in Darjeeling, India, and studied international law and democracy at Harvard University. He holds American citizenship.

== Early life and education ==
Sangay was born in a refugee community in Darjeeling, India, in 1968, with a typical Shichak (settlement) background amidst fields, cows, and chickens, fetching wood in the forest and helping his parents' small business, including selling winter sweaters. Sangay studied English Literature at Hansraj College, Delhi from 1988 to 1991. In 1995, he received a Fulbright Scholarship to study at Harvard Law School, where he subsequently received his LL.M. degree. Sangay spent 15 years at Harvard University, as a student and then as a senior fellow.

== Academic career ==
In 2003, Sangay organized five conferences between Chinese and Tibetan scholars, including a meeting between the Dalai Lama and thirty-five Chinese scholars at Harvard University.

In 2004, he became the first Tibetan to earn a S.J.D. degree from Harvard Law School and was a recipient of the 2004 Yong K. Kim' 95 Memorial Prize for excellence for his dissertation, Democracy in Distress: Is Exile Polity a Remedy? A Case Study of Tibet's Government-in-exile. In 2006, Sangay was selected as one of the twenty-four Young Leaders of Asia by the Asia Society, a global organization working to strengthen relationships and promote understanding among the people, leaders, and institutions of Asia and the United States. Funded by the Hao Ran Foundation, Sangay was a Senior Fellow at the East Asian Legal Studies Program at Harvard Law School through 2011. He is an expert in Tibetan law and international human rights law.

== Sikyong: 2011–2021 ==
On 14 March 2011, the 14th Dalai Lama decided not to assume any political and administrative authority. The Charter of Tibetans in Exile was updated immediately and came into force on 29 May 2011. According to Sangay, there was "a high level of anxiety among Tibetans" over the Dalai Lama's decision to relinquish his own political authority.

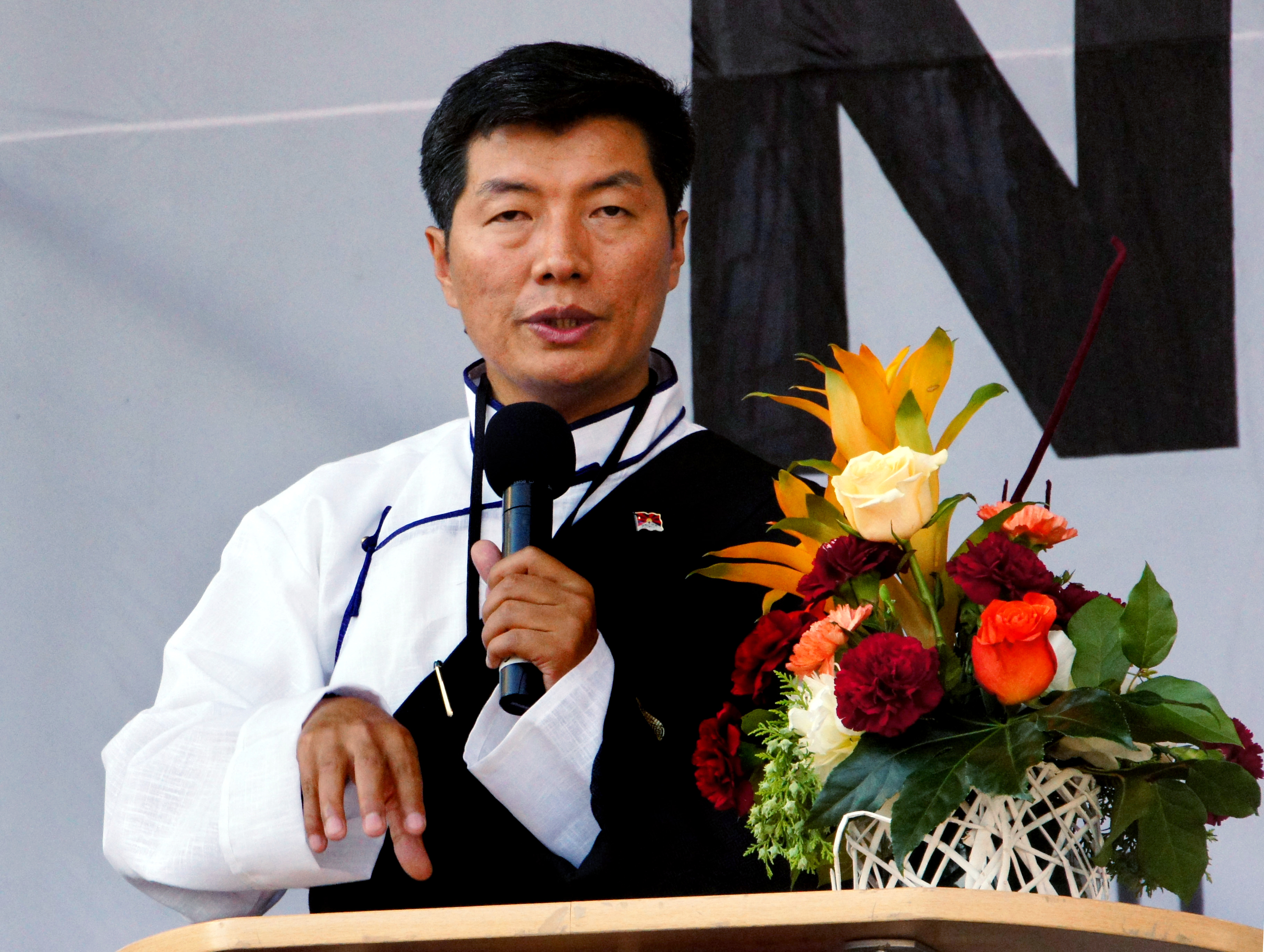
Lobsang Sangay in Vienna, Austria, in 2012.

On 27 April 2011, Sangay was elected Kalon Tripa of the Tibetan Administration. Sangay won 55% of the votes, defeating Tenzin Tethong (37.4%) and Tashi Wangdi (6.4%). 83,400 Tibetans were eligible to vote and 49,000 ballots were cast. On 8 August 2011, Sangay took the oath of office, succeeding Lobsang Tenzin as Sikyong.

In his role as Sikyong, Sangay has emphasized the importance of seeking a peaceful, non-violent resolution of the Tibet issue. He has supported the Dalai Lama's call for a Middle-Way Approach "that would provide for genuine autonomy for Tibet within the framework of Chinese constitution." Noting that China has established "one country, two systems" mechanisms in Hong Kong and Macau, he has argued that it makes no sense for China to continue to resist a similar solution for Tibet, which, he emphasizes, would be a "win-win" result.

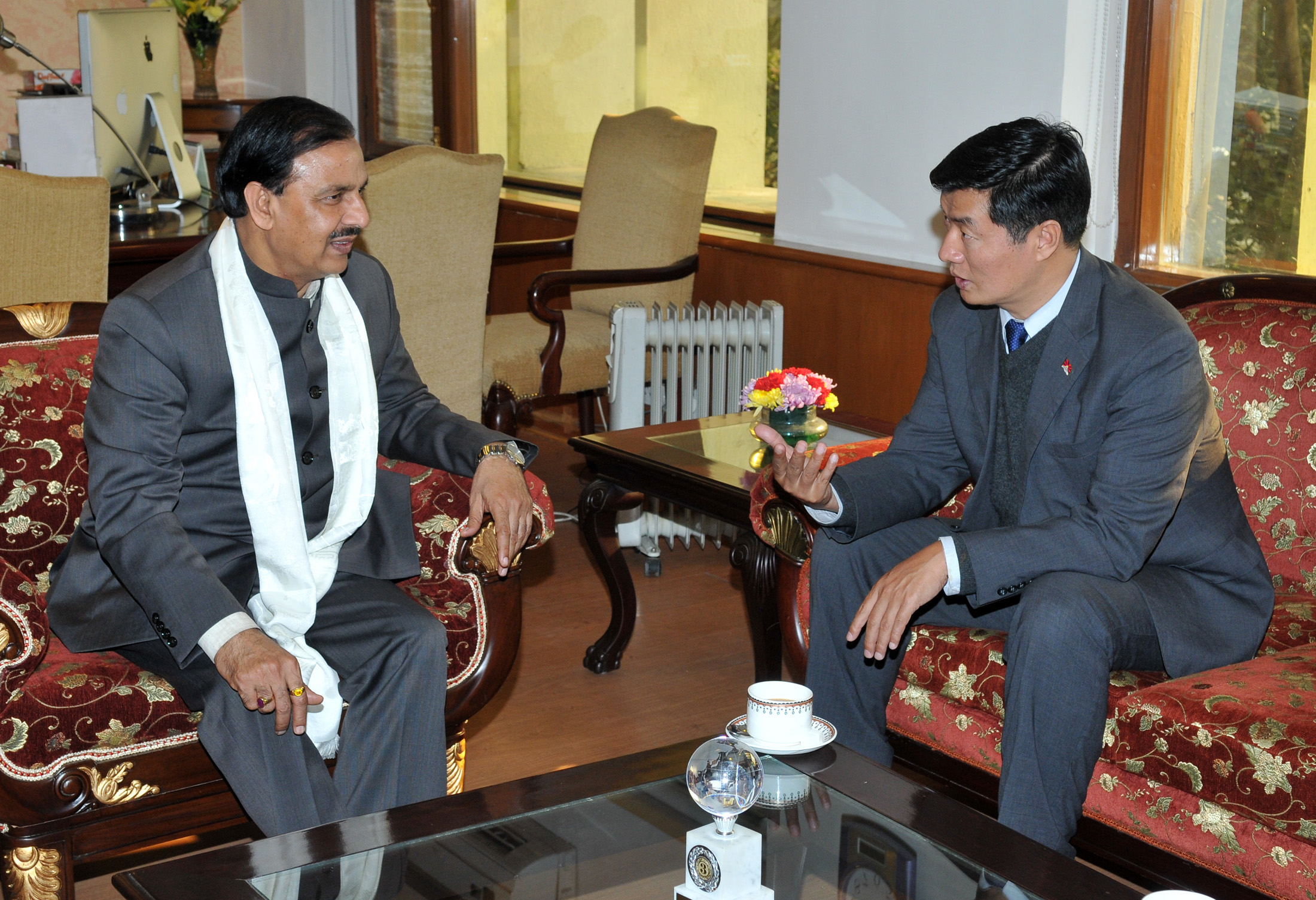
Lobsang Sangay with Indian Minister of State Mahesh Sharma in 2015.

In February 2013, he gave the first annual lecture of the Indian Association of Foreign Affairs Correspondence. Expressing concern about the possible ripple effects of recent acts of armed rebellion in west Asia, he called for the international community to strengthen its endorsement of non-violent approaches to oppression. "If non-violence is the right thing to do," he emphasized, "we ought to be supported by the international community." Noting the media attention given to armed Syrian "freedom fighters," he said: "Tibetans have been democratic and non-violent for the last so many decades, how come we don't receive similar support and attention?"

Sangay made a statement on 10 March 2013, the 54th anniversary of the Tibetan National Uprising Day, in which he paid tribute to the "yearning for freedom" that inspired "the epochal events of March 10, 1959," and dedicated the anniversary of those events "to all the self-immolators and those who have died for Tibet." He also restated his dedication to the Middle Way Approach, expressing hope that a "speedy resolution" by China of the Tibet issue could "serve as a model for other freedom struggles" and "be a catalyst for moderation of China."

In January 2017, outgoing US ambassador to India, Richard Verma, hosted Lobsang Sangay for a dinner along with an Indian minister and Richard Gere, an event that angered China.

In 2018, Sangay visited South Africa, although the government cancelled public events related to the visit after protests by South Africans and members of the local Chinese community.

In November 2020, Sangay became the first leader of the exiled Central Tibetan Administration to visit the White House in 60 years.

== Personal life ==
Sangay has been married for 23 years to Kesang Yangdon Shakchang, whose parents were from the Lhokha and Phare area. They have a daughter Menda Rewa. His father died in 2004.

Lobsang Sangay holds American citizenship and a United States passport. He has never lived in Tibet nor has he ever visited it. He received an invitation to visit it in 1980 but declined to do so because it would have required for him to get official Chinese documents.

== Awards and honors ==
Sangay was awarded the Presidential Medal award by Salisbury University, Maryland, USA, on 13 October 2015.

He received the Gold Medal of the College Historical Society of Trinity College Dublin for Outstanding Contribution to Public Discourse by the Auditor of the Society, Ms Ursula Ni Choill.

== Works ==
- Tibet: Exiles' Journey, Journal of Democracy – Volume 14, Number 3, July 2003, pp. 119–130 Tibet: Exiles' Journey archived Canada Tibet Committee | Library | WTN | Archive | Old
- We Sing a Song of Sadness Tibetan Political Prisoners Speak Out, Billy Jackson, Publish America, 2004, ISBN 1-4137-1677-6
- Lobsang Sangay, China in Tibet: Forty Years of Liberation or Occupation?, Harvard Asia Quarterly, Volume III, No. 3, 1999.
- Human rights and Buddhism : cultural relativism, individualism & universalism, Thesis (LL. M.), Harvard Law School, 1996, OCLC 43348085
- Democracy in distress : is exile polity a remedy? : a case study of Tibet's government in exile, Thesis (S.J.D.), Harvard Law School, 2004, OCLC 62578261
- A constitutional analysis of the secularization of the Tibetan diaspora : the role of the Dalai Lama, in Theology and the soul of the liberal state, ed. Leonard V Kaplan; Charles Lloyd Cohen, Lanham : Lexington Books, 2010, ISBN 978-0-7391-2617-2
- The Battle for the Soul of the Dalai Lama, Foreign Affairs, 6 November 2023

== See also ==
- List of foreign ministers in 2016
- List of foreign ministers in 2017
- List of current foreign ministers
- Foreign relations of Tibet

Political offices
Preceded by Lobsang Tenzin	Sikyong of the Central Tibetan Administration; 2011–present	Incumbent
Preceded by Dicki Chhoyang	Foreign Minister of the Central Tibetan Administration; 28 February 2016–present	Incumbent
