= Samdhong Rinpoche =

Tibetan Lama

- ཟམ་གདོང་རིན་པོ་ཆེ
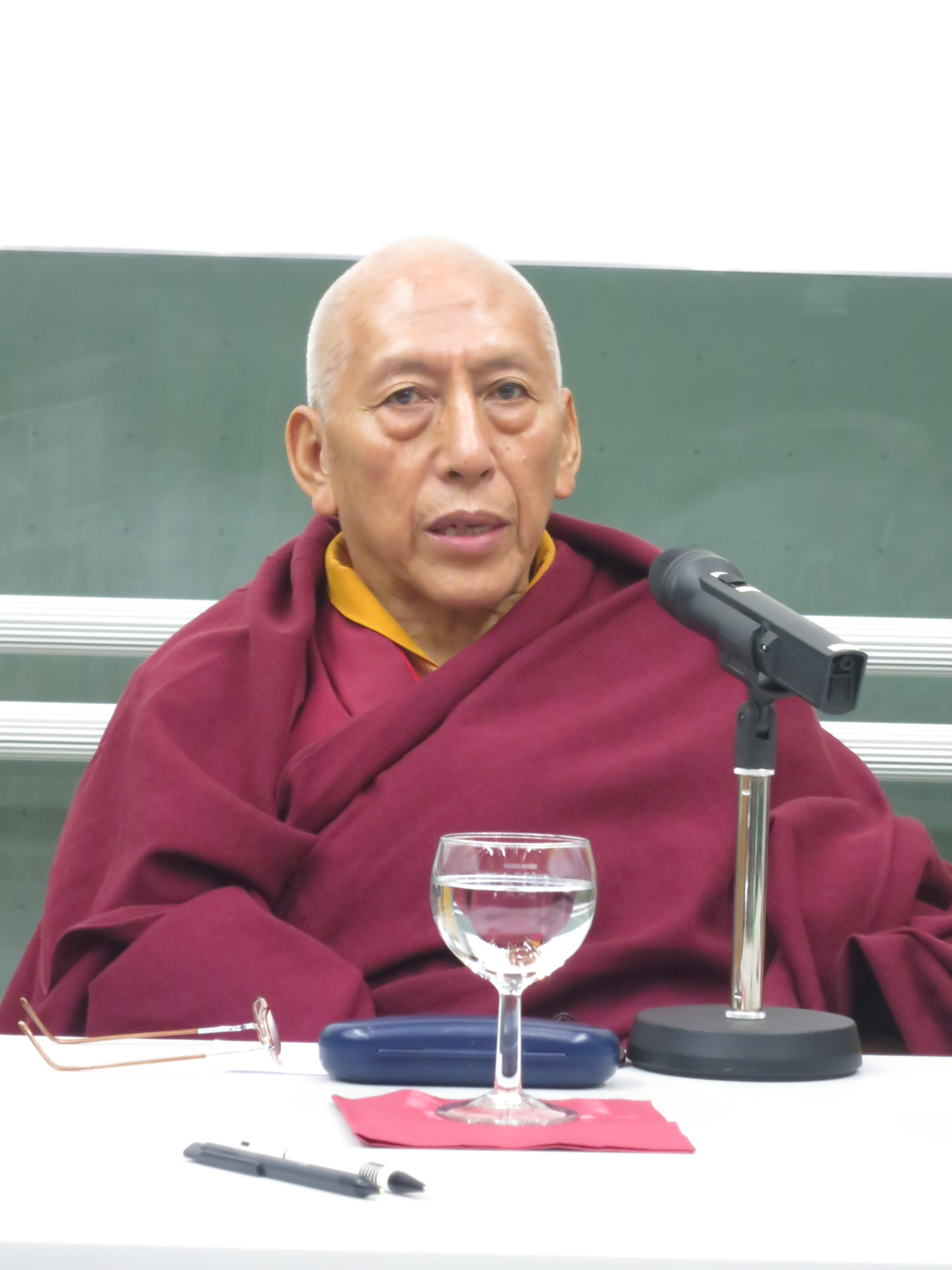
- Incumbent; Lobsang Tenzin since 1944
- Style: His Eminence
- Type: Religious title
- Website: Official website

Samdhong Rinpoche (Tibetan: ཟམ་གདོང་རིན་པོ་ཆེ་, Wylie: zam gdong rin po che) is a Tibetan religious title. Rinpoche means "precious one". The current Samdhong Rinpoche is Lobsang Tenzin, who is considered by Tibetan buddhists to be the reincarnation of the 4th Samdhong Rinpoche.

== List of Samdhong Rinpoche ==
No.	Portrait	Name	Lifespan	Recognised	Enthronement	Ref.
1		Phagpa Rabga				
2		Tenphel Nyima				
3		Tenphel Gyaltsen				
4		Tsultim Gyatso				
5		Lobsang Tenzin	born 1939	1944	1944	
