= Sikyong =

Head of government of the Central Tibetan Administration

Head of the Central Tibetan Administration
- སྲིད་སྐྱོང༌
- Emblem of Tibet

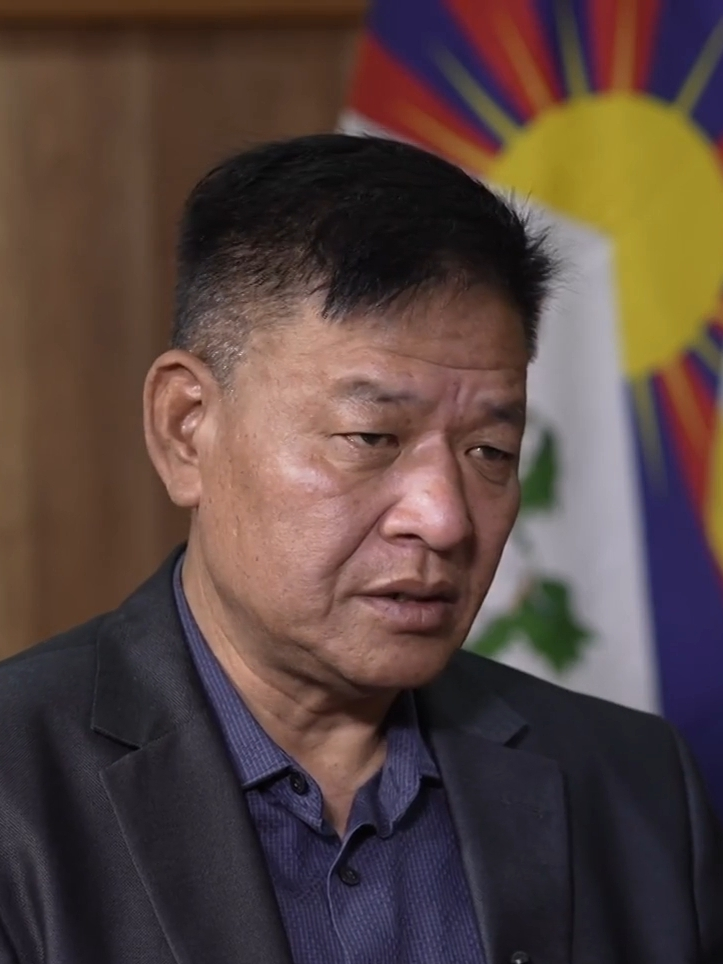
- Incumbent; Penpa Tsering since 21 May 2021
- Central Tibetan Administration
- Style: His Excellency
- Member of: Cabinet
- Residence: Dharamsala, India
- Appointer: Direct popular vote
- Term length: Five years
- Formation: 1907 (as Kalön Tripa); 8 August 2011 (as Sikyong)
- Website: www.tibet.net

The Sikyong (Tibetan: སྲིད་སྐྱོང༌, Wylie: srid-skyong, Lhasa dialect: [ˈsícóŋ]) is the political leader of the Central Tibetan Administration, a Tibetan exile organisation in India also known as the Tibetan government-in-exile based on the 2011 Charter of Tibetans-in-exile. The title was created in 2012 after the 14th Dalai Lama decided not to assume any political and administrative authority as the head of the Tibetan Administration for Tibetans-in-exile.

The current Sikyong is Penpa Tsering. The Sikyong is the political leader of the Kashag, part of the executive branch of the Central Tibetan Administration. This office should not be confused with the "Chairman of the People's Government of the Tibet Autonomous Region" (西藏自治区人民政府主席) appointed by the Communist government in Beijing.

The first directly elected Kalön Tripa was Lobsang Tenzin, the Samdhong Rinpoche, who was elected August 20, 2001.

Before 2011, the Kalön Tripa position was subordinate to the 14th Dalai Lama who presided over the government in exile from its founding. In 2011, the Dalai Lama announced that his political authority would be transferred to the Sikyong.

== Kalön Tripa ==
On September 20, 2012, the 15th Tibetan Parliament-in-Exile unanimously voted to change the title of Kalön Tripa to Sikyong in Article 19 of the Charter of the Tibetans in exile and relevant articles. The Dalai Lama had previously referred to the Kalon Tripa as Sikyong, and this usage was cited as the primary justification for the name change. According to Tibetan Review, "Sikyong" translates to "political leader". The online Dharma Dictionary translates sikyong (srid skyong) as "secular ruler; regime, regent".

== Kalön Tripa ==
=== Tibet ===
| No. | Portrait | Name (birth–death) | Term of office | | | Dalai Lama | Ref. |
| No. | Portrait | Name (birth–death) | Took office | Left office | Time in office | Dalai Lama | Ref. |
|---|---|---|---|---|---|---|---|
| 1 | | Tsarong Wangchuk Gyalpo (?–c. 1912) | 1903 | 1912 | 8–9 years | 13th Dalai Lama (1879–1933) | |
| 1 | | Chankhyim Trekhang Thupten Shakya (?–c. 1920) | 1907 | 1920 | 12–13 years | 13th Dalai Lama (1879–1933) | |
| 1 | | Paljor Dorje Shatra (c. 1860–c. 1926) | 1907 | 1923 | 15–16 years | 13th Dalai Lama (1879–1933) | |
| 1 | | Sholkhang Dhondup Phuntsog (1862–1926) | 1907 | 1926 | 18–19 years | 13th Dalai Lama (1879–1933) | |
| 2 | | Langdun (1906–1980) | 1926 | 1940 | 13–14 years | 13th Dalai Lama (1879–1933); 14th Dalai Lama (1937–1950) | |
| 3 | | Lobsang Tashi (1897–1966) | 1950 | 27 April 1952 | 1–2 years | 14th Dalai Lama (1937–1950) | |
| 3 | | Lukhangwa (1895–1966) | 1950 | 27 April 1952 | 1–2 years | 14th Dalai Lama (1937–1950) | |

== Kashag ==
| No. | Portrait | Name (birth–death) | Term of office | | | Dalai Lama | Ref. |
| No. | Portrait | Name (birth–death) | Took office | Left office | Time in office | Dalai Lama | Ref. |
|---|---|---|---|---|---|---|---|
| 1 | | Jangsa Tsangy | 1959 | 1960 | 0–1 years | 14th Dalai Lama in exile (1950–present) | |
| 2 | | Surkhang Wangchen Gelek (1910–1977) | 1960 | 1964 | 3–4 years | 14th Dalai Lama in exile (1950–present) | |
| 3 | | Gyurme Sonam Topgyal (1896–1967) | 1965 | 1967 † | 1–2 years | 14th Dalai Lama in exile (1950–present) | |
| 4 | | Garang Lobsang Rigzin (1905–?) | 1970 | 1975 | 4–5 years | 14th Dalai Lama in exile (1950–present) | |
| 5 | | Kunling Woeser Gyaltsen (1915–2001) | 1975 | 1980 | 4–5 years | 14th Dalai Lama in exile (1950–present) | |
| 6 | | Wangdue Dorjee (1919–1994) | 1980 | 1985 | 4–5 years | 14th Dalai Lama in exile (1950–present) | |
| 7 | | Juchen Thupten Namgyal (1929–2011) | 1985 | 1990 | 4–5 years | 14th Dalai Lama in exile (1950–present) | |
| 8 | | Kalsang Yeshi (born 1941) | 1990 | 1991 | 0–1 years | 14th Dalai Lama in exile (1950–present) | |
| 9 | | Gyalo Thondup (1928–2025) | 1991 | 1993 | 1–2 years | 14th Dalai Lama in exile (1950–present) | |
| 10 | | Tenzin Tethong (born 1947) | 1993 | 1996 | 2–3 years | 14th Dalai Lama in exile (1950–present) | |
| 11 | | Sonam Topgyal (1940–2012) | April 1997 | 5 September 2001 | 4 years, 5 months | 14th Dalai Lama in exile (1950–present) | |
| 12 | | Lobsang Tenzin (born 1937) | 5 September 2001 | 8 August 2011 | 9 years, 337 days | 14th Dalai Lama in exile (1950–present) | |
| 13 | | Lobsang Sangay (born 1968) | 8 August 2011 | 20 September 2012 | 1 year, 43 days | 14th Dalai Lama in exile (1950–present) | |

== Sikyong ==
| No. | Portrait | Name (birth–death) | Term of office | | | Cabinet | Elected | Ref. |
| No. | Portrait | Name (birth–death) | Took office | Left office | Time in office | Cabinet | Elected | Ref. |
|---|---|---|---|---|---|---|---|---|
| 1 | | Lobsang Sangay (born 1968) | 20 September 2012 | 21 May 2021 | 8 years, 243 days | 14th cabinet | 2011-12 | |
| 1 | | Lobsang Sangay (born 1968) | 20 September 2012 | 21 May 2021 | 8 years, 243 days | 15th cabinet | 2016-17 | |
| 2 | | Penpa Tsering (born 1967) | 21 May 2021 | Incumbent | 5 years, 110 days | 16th cabinet | – | |
| 2 | | Penpa Tsering (born 1967) | 21 May 2021 | Incumbent | 5 years, 110 days | 17th cabinet | 2021-22 | |

== See also ==
- 2021 Central Tibetan Administration general election
