= Tashi Wangdi =

Tibetan diplomat and politician (1947–2025)

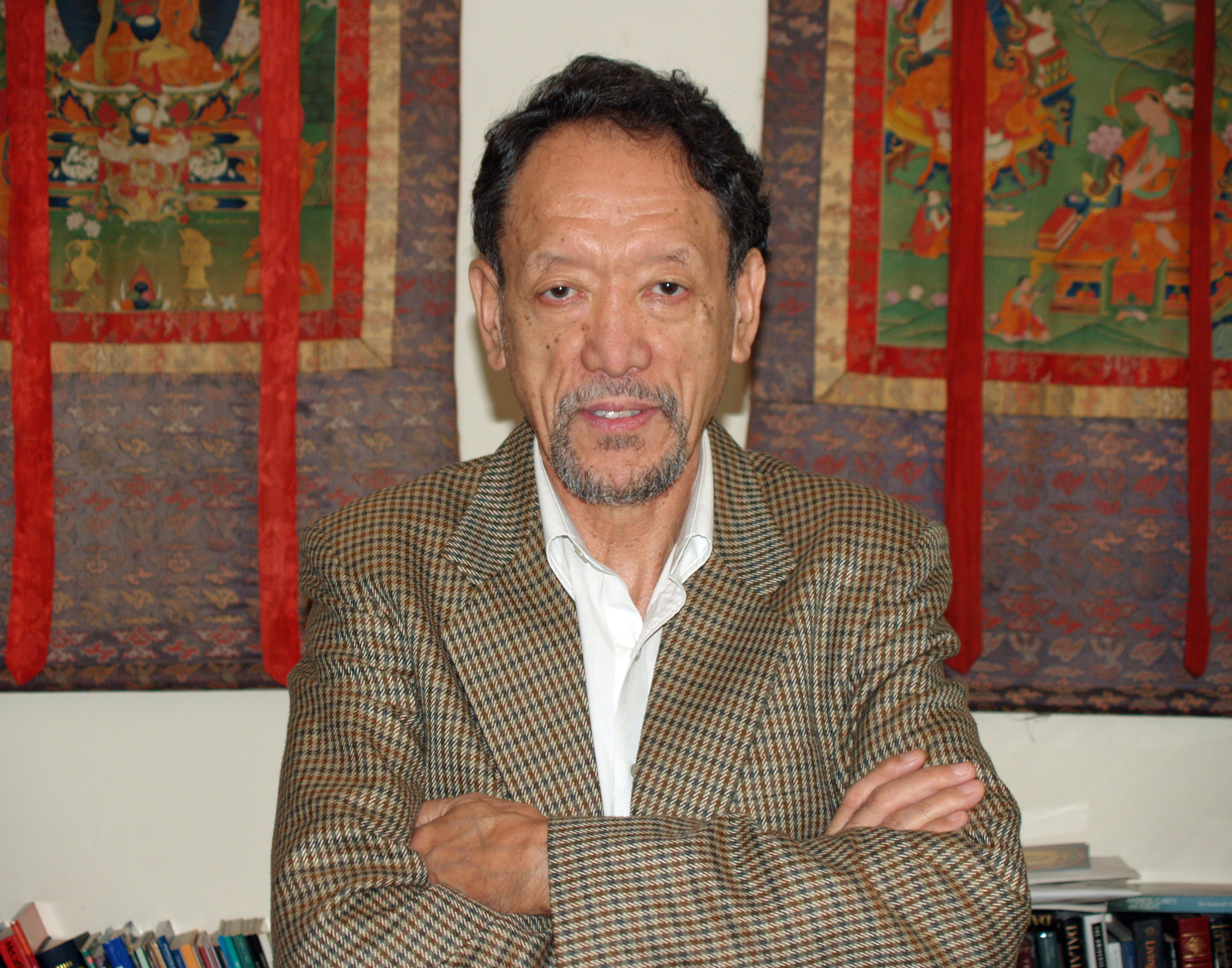
Tashi Wangdi in 2007

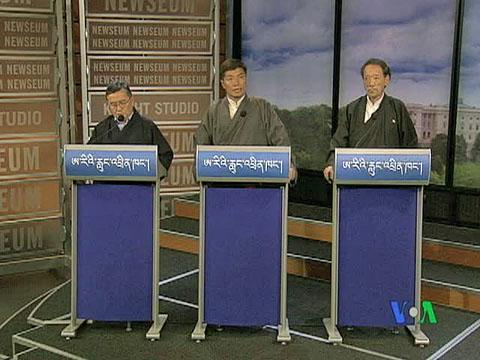
Tenzin Tethong (l), Lobsang Sangay (c) and Tashi Wangdi (r) Prime Minister of the Tibetan Government-in-Exile debate in Washington on an internationally-televised debate, 1 March 2011

Tashi Wangdi (Tibetan: བཀྲ་ཤིས་དབང་འདུས་, Wylie: Bkra-shis Dbang-'dus; 15 April 1947 – 1 May 2025) was the representative to the Americas of the Dalai Lama, Tenzin Gyatso, from 16 April 2005 to 2008. From 1966 he served the Central Tibetan Administration, Tibet's government-in-exile. He held the position of kalon, or cabinet minister, in virtually every major department, including the Department of Religion and Culture, Department of Home, Department of Education, Department of Information and International Relations, Department of Security, and Department of Health.

Wangdi studied at Durham University, graduating with a degree in Politics and Sociology in 1973. He was once the Dalai Lama's representative to the Indian government in New Delhi.

"We are seeking a solution within the framework of the Chinese Constitution for a meaningful autonomy", said Wangdi of his government's status. "Until we are able to achieve that goal, we effectively have a government in exile with a charter—a Constitution. In that charter, His Holiness [the Dalai Lama] is effectively head of state, and the prime minister is head of government."

Wangdi died on 1 May 2025, at the age of 78.
