= Lobsang Tenzin =

Tibetan Buddhist monk and politician (born 1936/37)

Lobsang Tenzin, 5th Samdhong Rinpoche
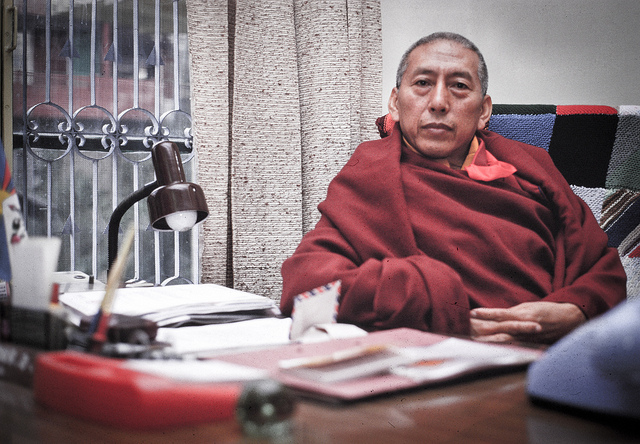

Prime Minister of the Central Tibetan Administration
- In office 5 September 2001 – 8 August 2011
- Monarch: Tenzin Gyatso
- Preceded by: Sonam Topgyal
- Succeeded by: Lobsang Sangay

Personal details
- Born: 5 November 1939 (age 87) Jol, Tibet
- Education: Drepung Monastery

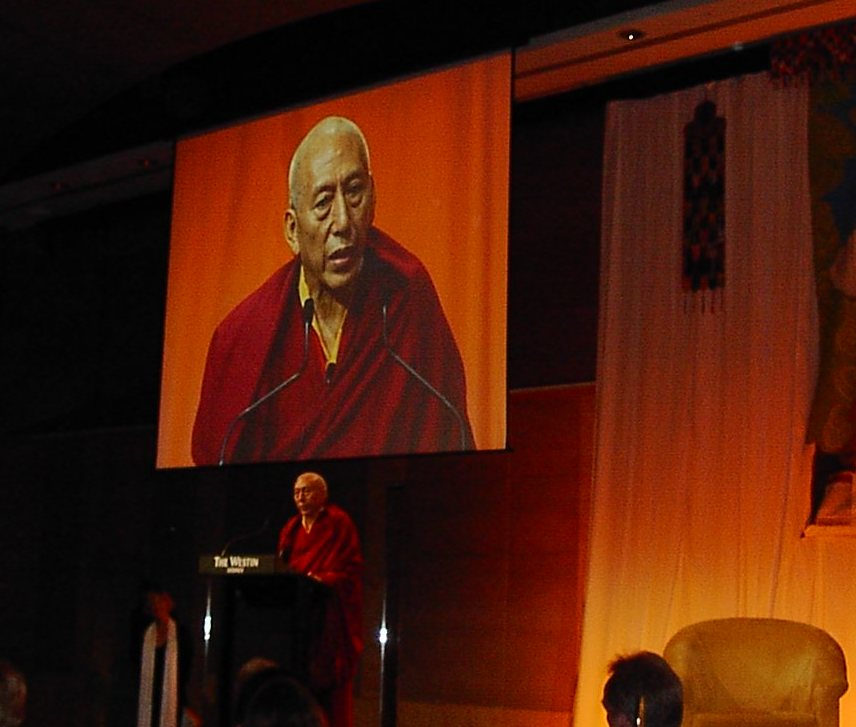
Tenzin at a fund-raising dinner in Sydney, Australia. (2006)

Lobsang Tenzin, better known by the titles Professor Venerable Samdhong Rinpoche (zam gdong rin po che) and to Tibetans as the 5th Samdhong Rinpoche (born 5 November 1937), is a Tibetan Buddhist monk and politician who served as the Prime Minister (then officially called the Kalon Tripa or chairman) of the cabinet of the Central Tibetan Administration, the Tibetan government-in-exile based in Dharamshala, India.

== Early life ==
Samdhong Rinpoche was born in Jol in eastern Tibet. At the age of five, he was recognised, according to Tibetan tradition, as the reincarnation of the 4th Samdhong Rinpoche and enthroned in Gaden Dechenling Monastery at Jol. Two years later he took vows as a monk, started his religious training at Drepung Monastery in Lhasa and completed it at the Madhyamika School of Buddhism.

== Exile to India and life as an educationist ==
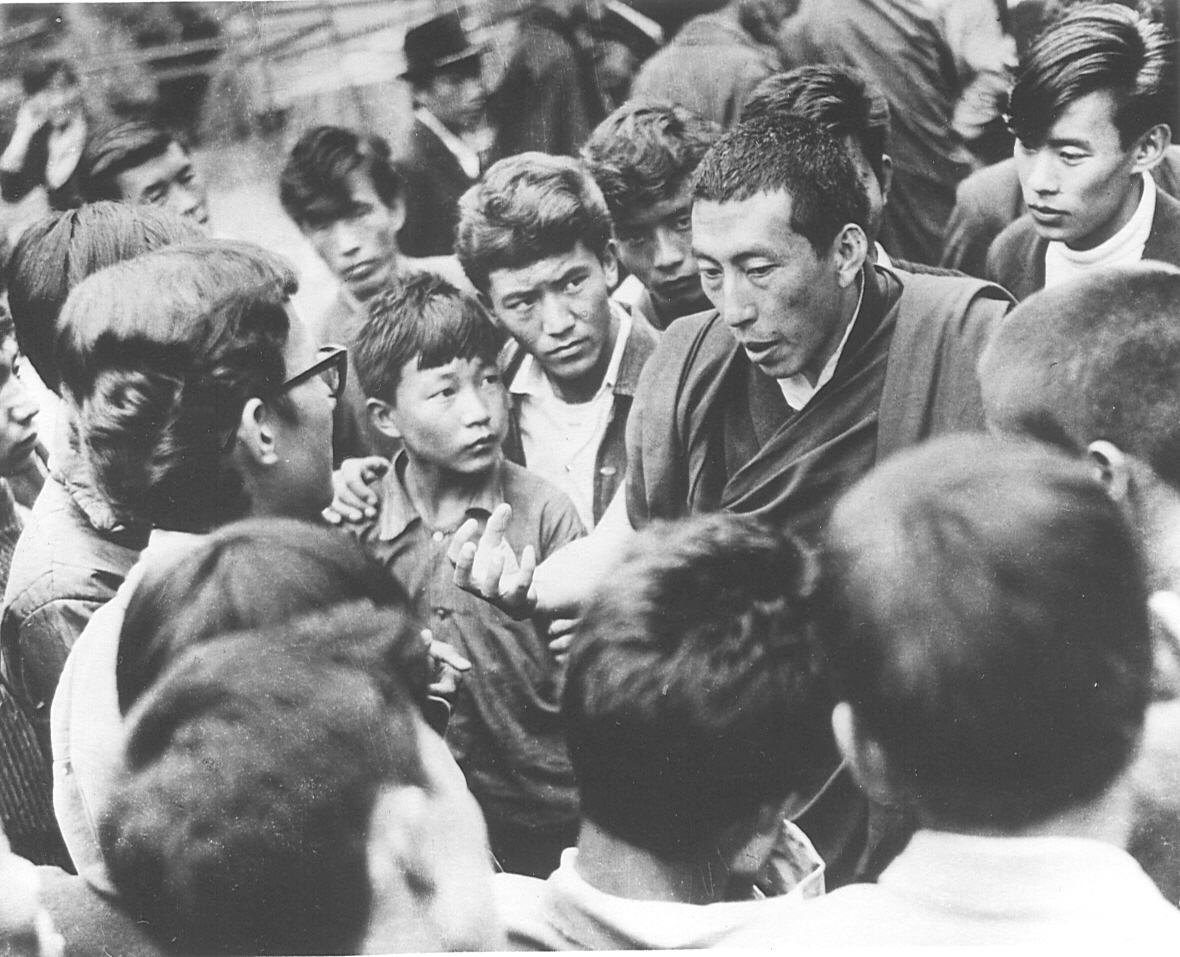
Children of Tibet with Samdhong Rinpoche

After his training in Lhasa, he fled to India in 1959, after the Tibetan Uprising, along with many Tibetans who followed the 14th Dalai Lama, Tenzin Gyatso into exile. From October 1961, he served as the religious teacher of Tibetan School in Shimla and in 1963 served as the acting Principal. In 1964 he worked as religious teacher of Darjeeling Tibetan School and in 1965 at the age of 26, he was appointed as the Principal of Central School for Tibetans, Dalhousie and served there till 1970. He received his Lharampa degree in the year 1968 and Ngagrimpa degree in 1969. In 1971 he became Principal of Central Institute of Higher Tibetan Studies (CIHTS) at Varanasi (Benares), and from 1988 to 2001 he was the director.

From 1994 to 1995, he was awarded National Lectureship from Indian Council of Philosophical Research (ICPR), New Delhi. He assumed many important responsibilities including President of the Association of Indian Universities (AIU), a strong academic group of more than 250 Vice-Chancellors of Indian Universities, Chancellor of Sanchi University of Buddhist-Indic Studies and Chairman of various Trust and Foundations. He is regarded as one of the leading Tibetan scholars of Buddhism and is also an authority on the teachings of Mahatma Gandhi. He is fluent in Hindi and English, Tibetan being his mother tongue. Rinpoche is one of the very few Buddhist scholars in the world with this depth, experience and clarity in Buddhist philosophy and he also spent many years exploring directly with Jiddu Krishnamurthy, who was one of the great educationists in India. Rinpoche has been an honored guest at many forums in India. He has spoken on challenges India faces today, and has stressed on inclusion of the poor masses in development of the country.

== Political activities ==
In 1991 Lobsang Tenzin was appointed by the Dalai Lama as a member of the Assembly of Tibetan People's Deputies, and later was unanimously elected as its chairman. Rinpoche served twice as the Speaker of the Tibetan Parliament-in-Exile from 1991 to 2001. Between 1996 and 2001, he was an elected member of the Assembly representing exiled Tibetans from Kham province and also its chairman. Rinpoche contributed to drafting the new constitution of the Tibetan Government in Exile, introduced educational and economic reforms, and ensured a policy of non-violence, transparency, environmental sustainability, and organic farming.

In 2000 the Dalai Lama decided that the Tibetan people in exile should elect their own Prime Minister, and in July 2001 Lobsang Tenzin was elected with about 29,000 votes, or about 84% of those cast, which is about 25% of the exile Tibetan population. Juchen Thubten Namgyal, the other candidate, won the remainder. Since 2001 he has travelled extensively to gain support for the cause of Tibetan autonomy and raise awareness of the Dalai Lama's proposals for negotiating autonomy with the Chinese government.

During his Prime Ministership, Rinpoche negotiated many times with the Chinese officials to bring a suitable solution to the Tibetan cause. However no meaningful development could be made in this direction.

== Advocacy and teachings ==
Samdhong Rinpoche is an advocate of Gandhian philosophy, is a lifelong campaigner of non violence and is on the board of trustees of Swaraj Peeth Trust, a Gandhian centre for non violence and peace. He has held lectures and talks with exchange groups in Germany, Switzerland and USA where he spoke extensively on Buddhist ideology and its importance in contemporary politics and economy. A large score of his lectures on general subjects like peace, happiness and compassion, electoral reforms, modern ethics, the environment, Swaraj and non violence are available in audio and video on his website and SoundCloud.

== Stance on "Middle Way Approach" ==
Rinpoche is a staunch supporter of the middle path and in sync with the views of the Dalai Lama. He is of the opinion that the Tibet issue is alive on the international forum and has received widespread support due to its right direction and commitment to non violence.

In his own words

“Tibet cause is a just cause and not a power struggle. It is neither a political struggle nor a battle against the system. It is the struggle between truth and falsehood; justice and injustice.”

A lifelong campaigner of Gandhian principles, he seeks not only political freedom for the Tibetan people but also to preserve the Tibetan Culture. In an interview he said,

“Our ultimate goal is not just political freedom but the preservation of Tibetan culture. What will we gain if we win political freedom but lose what gives value to our lives? It is why we reject the option of violence. For respect for life is an inseparable aspect of the Tibetan culture we are fighting for."

== Note on his name ==
Lobsang Tenzin is his given Tibetan name. His legal name in India is Samdhong Rinpoche, although in fact this is a Tibetan religious title, like the Dalai Lama. In English he is commonly called Professor Rinpoche, and accepts this although it is incorrect. Tibetans address him as Rinpoche, which literally means "the precious one", used to be styled tulkus (incarnate lamas).

== Publications ==
1. Buddhist Meditation
2. Zam-gdoṅ Rin-po-cheʼi gsuṅ bśad daṅ gsuṅ rtsom phyogs bsgrigs
3. Samdhong Rinpoche Uncompromising Truth for a Compromised World
4. Bod kyi da ltaʼi dza drag gnas bab daṅ ṅa tshoʼi las ʼgan
5. "Biography of H.E. Venerable Professor Samdhong Rinpoche" by Liisa Cay Pasila. Publisher: Library of Tibetan Works and Archives in 2025.

Political offices
Preceded by Sonam Topgyal	Prime Minister of the Central Tibetan Administration; 2001–2011	Succeeded by Lobsang Sangay
