= Dolma Gyari =

Tibetan politician

Dölma Gyari
- Gyari in 2008

Minister for Security
- Incumbent
- Assumed office 10 November 2021
- Monarch: 14th Dalai Lama
- Leader: Penpa Tsering

Minister for Home Department
- In office 2011–2016

Member of the Tibetan Parliament in Exile
- In office 1991–2011

Personal details
- Born: 1964 (age 61–62) Kalimpong, West Bengal
- Party: Tibetan Youth Congress
- Relations: Lodi Gyari (brother)
- Education: Punjab University (BA); Delhi University (LLB)

Dölma Gyari (Tibetan: རྒྱ་རི་སྒྲོལ་མ, born 1964) is a Tibetan politician in exile and a former activist, active since the early 1980s.

== Early life and education ==
Gyari was born in 1964 to a well to do family in Kalimpong in India. She studied at the Central School for Tibetans (CST) Darjeeling and graduated in 1981. She was a recipient of the school's best girl medal. She received her BA in Political Science at Punjab University and LLB at Delhi University.

== Family ==
Dolma Gyari was born in India to a prominent Tibetan family from Kham Nyagrong. Her grandmother Chimi Dolma, the female chieftain of Nyarong, led the Gyaritsang army into many battles with the invading Communist army.

Dorje Youdon, Gyari's mother, also the wife of a chieftain, led the Tibetan army into many battles at the age of 18.

Her brother, the late Lodi Gyari Rinpoche, the envoy of the Dalai Lama, and chairperson of International Campaign for Tibet (ICT), led the ten rounds of Sino-Tibet dialogues until 2010.

== Activism ==
Gyari was a student leader who represented girl students, international students, Tibetan students, and Tibetan women students through various student groups and committees during her days in Darjeeling and Chandigarh.

She worked for the Regional Tibetan Youth Congress in Chandigarh during the same time and joined the central Tibetan Youth Congress (TYC) later. TYC is the largest grassroots Non-governmental organization in the Tibetan exile community across the world.

Gyari was elected as the executive member of Central TYC and worked as Information Secretary and Joint Secretary for two terms in the late 80s.

== Political career ==
She was elected to the Tibetan parliament in exile at 26 and served for close to two decades, from 1991 to 2011, as a member of parliament and as deputy speaker, the highest position held by a Tibetan woman in the history of Tibet.

During her time as MP and Deputy Speaker, she was a part of the major transitions the Tibetan democracy adopted, from the drafting of the charter-in-exile to direct election of Kalon Tripa (Head of the Cabinet) by the people, to revisiting Tibetan political approach, connecting with world leaders and people to the devolution of political power by the Dalai Lama.

In 2011, Gyari announced her decision to run for Sikyong of the Central Tibetan Administration, equivalent to the prime minister of a country, but withdrew later.

After the election, she was appointed as the Nangsi Kalon (Home Minister) of the CTA. During her tenure as CTA Home Minister, the Tibetan Rehabilitation Policy of 2014 was formulated by the government of India, which addressed the many lands and social welfare concerns of the Tibetan refugees.

In 2004, she was appointed by the Dalai Lama to be the Chairperson of the Tibetan Centre for Human Rights and Democracy (TCHRD), taking over from Prof. S. Samdhong Rinpoche.

In 2020, Gyari once again announced her candidacy for Sikyong.

== Awards ==
Gyari is a recipient of the Nari Shakti award presented by International Nepali Sanskritik Parishad, Uttam Nagrik Puraskar by the Maharashtra Dalit Sahitya Akademy, and Peace of India award presented by Goa state.
