= 2016 Central Tibetan Administration general election =

- October 18, 2015 (first round); March 20, 2016 (second round)
- Sikyong
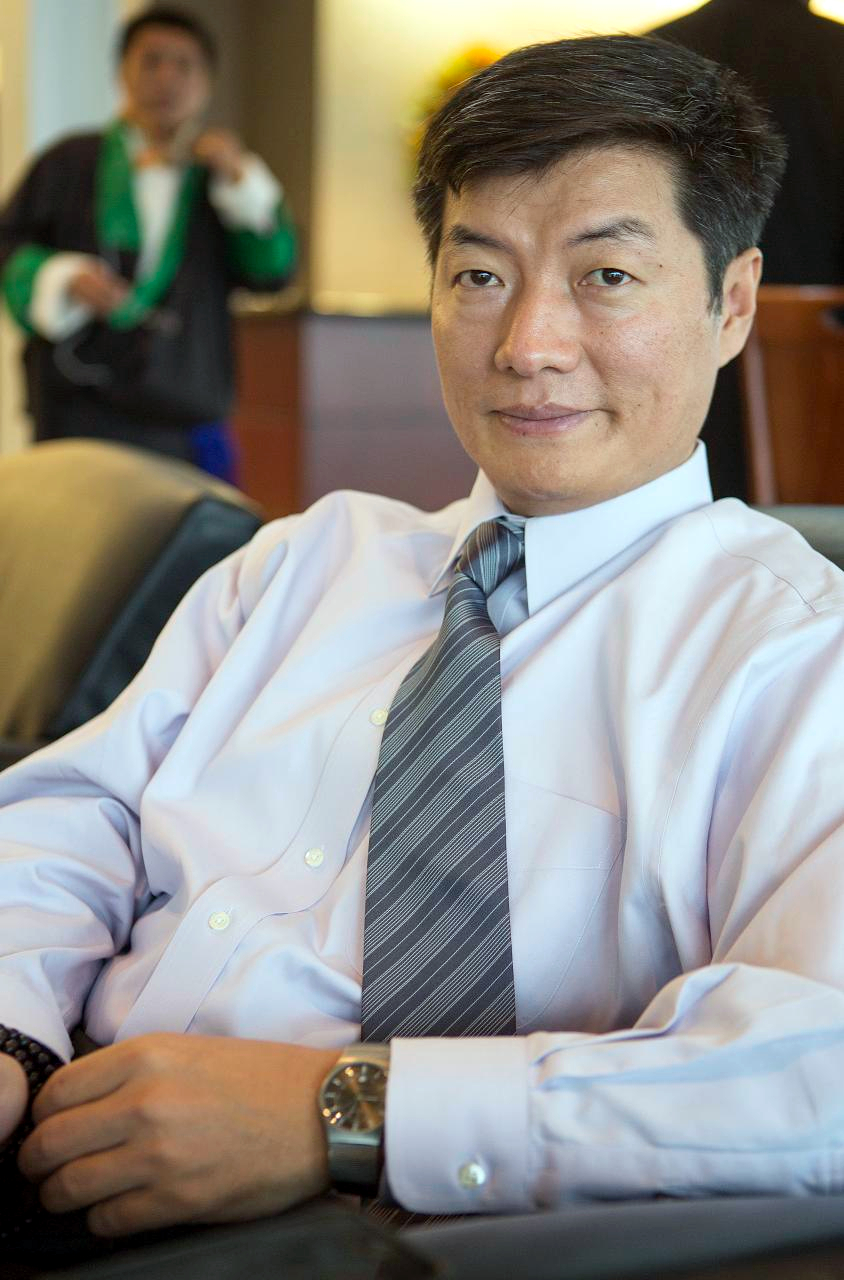

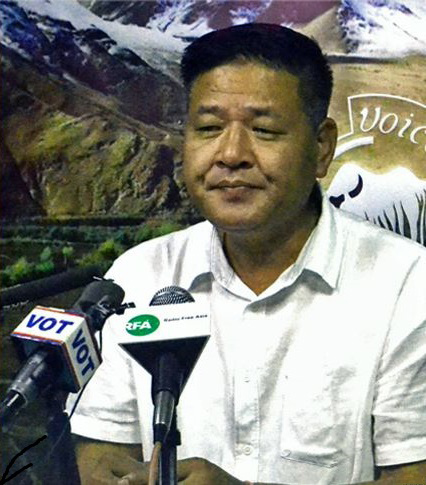
Candidate	Lobsang Sangay	Penpa Tsering
Party	National Democratic	National Democratic
Popular vote	33,876	24,864
Percentage	57.67%	42.33%
Sikyong before election
Lobsang Sangay
National Democratic
Elected Sikyong
Lobsang Sangay
National Democratic

Elections for the office of Sikyong and the Chitue (Members) of the Tibetan Parliament in Exile were held between October 18, 2015 and March 20, 2016. Tibetans in exile voted for the fourth time their political representative and executive of the Central Tibetan Administration, the self-proclaimed Tibetan government in exile. The election was overseen and organized by the independent CTA agency, Tibetan Election Commission.

Incumbent Sikyong Lobsang Sangay ran for re-election, winning with 57.3% of the votes in the second round, over his main rival Speaker of the Parliament in Exile, Penpa Tsering. Other candidates were Chairman of the Federation of Tibetan Cooperatives in India, Tashi Wangdu, and former Chinese political prisoner and president of Tibetan Ex-Political Prisoner's Association, Lukar Jam.

For the first time this election showed and proliferation of political parties, something unusual in Tibetan politics. The National Democratic Party, a moderate independent leaning party, has traditionally been the only political party in the Tibetan diaspora. The NDPT endorsed both Sangay and Pempa Tsering for their current offices. The pro-Middle Way Approach Tibetan People's Party endorsed Wangdu and also presented its own candidates for Parliament. The radically separatist Tibetan National Congress endorsed Jam.

== Results ==
=== Sikyong ===
The preliminary round of voting for Sikyong was held on 18 October 2015. Candidates needed to receive at least 33% of the vote in order to be eligible for the final round.

There were six candidates; Lobsang Sangay (incumbent Sikyong, endorsed by the National Democratic Party), Penpa Tsering (Speaker of Parliament, also endorsed by NDPT), Atsok Lukar Jam (former political prisoner and activist, endorsed by Tibetan National Congress), Tashi Wangdu (President of the Federation of Tibetan Cooperatives in India, endorsed by People's Party of Tibet), Tashi Topgyal (independent candidate) and Samdhong Rinpoche. All candidates except Jam (who wants full independence of Tibet from China) supported the Middle Way Approach to Chinese-Tibetan relations. This is the same approach endorsed by the Dalai Lama and seeks to achieve real autonomy for Tibet inside the Chinese territory.

Candidate	Party	Preliminary round		Final round	
Candidate	Party	Votes	%	Votes	%
Lobsang Sangay	National Democratic Party	30,508	66.71	33,876	57.67
Penpa Tsering	National Democratic Party	10,732	23.47	24,864	42.33
Lukar Jam Atsok	Tibetan National Congress	2,557	5.59		
Tashi Wangdu	People's Party of Tibet	1,880	4.11		
Tashi Topgyal	Independent	38	0.08		
Samdhong Rinpoche	Independent	18	0.04		
Total		45,733	100.00	58,740	100.00
Valid votes				58,740	98.97
Invalid/blank votes				613	1.03
Total votes				59,353	100.00
Registered voters/turnout				90,377	65.67
Source: CTA
