= Tibetan National Congress =

Tibetan National Congress བོད་རྒྱལ་ཡོངས་རང་བཙན་ལྷན་ཚོགས
- Founded: 13 February 2013
- Ideology: Tibetan nationalism; Tibetan independence
- Political position: Right-wing
- Seats in Parliament: 0 / 43

The Tibetan National Congress is a Tibetan political party in exile of pro-independence ideology founded on 13 February 2013. The party maintains more radical positions than the moderate pro-independence National Democratic Party (the major party among the Tibetan diaspora) and supported the candidacy of former political prisoner Lukar Jam for Sikyong (Prime Minister of the Tibetan government in Dharamsala) in the 2016 elections, as the only one of the candidates that supports the full independence of Tibet and not just greater autonomy. Party leaders have described it as a political option for Tibetans of pro-independence ideas. The party is not represented in the Parliament of the Central Tibetan Administration.
