= List of chief secretaries of Rajasthan =

The Chief Secretary is the highest-ranking officer in the Indian Administrative Service (IAS) in the state government of Rajasthan. This position acts as the principal advisor to the Chief Minister and the state government and is responsible for the administration of various departments within the state. The Chief Secretary also coordinates with the central government and other states, ensuring the implementation of government policies and programs. The incumbent chief secretary of Rajasthan is Voruganti Srinivas.

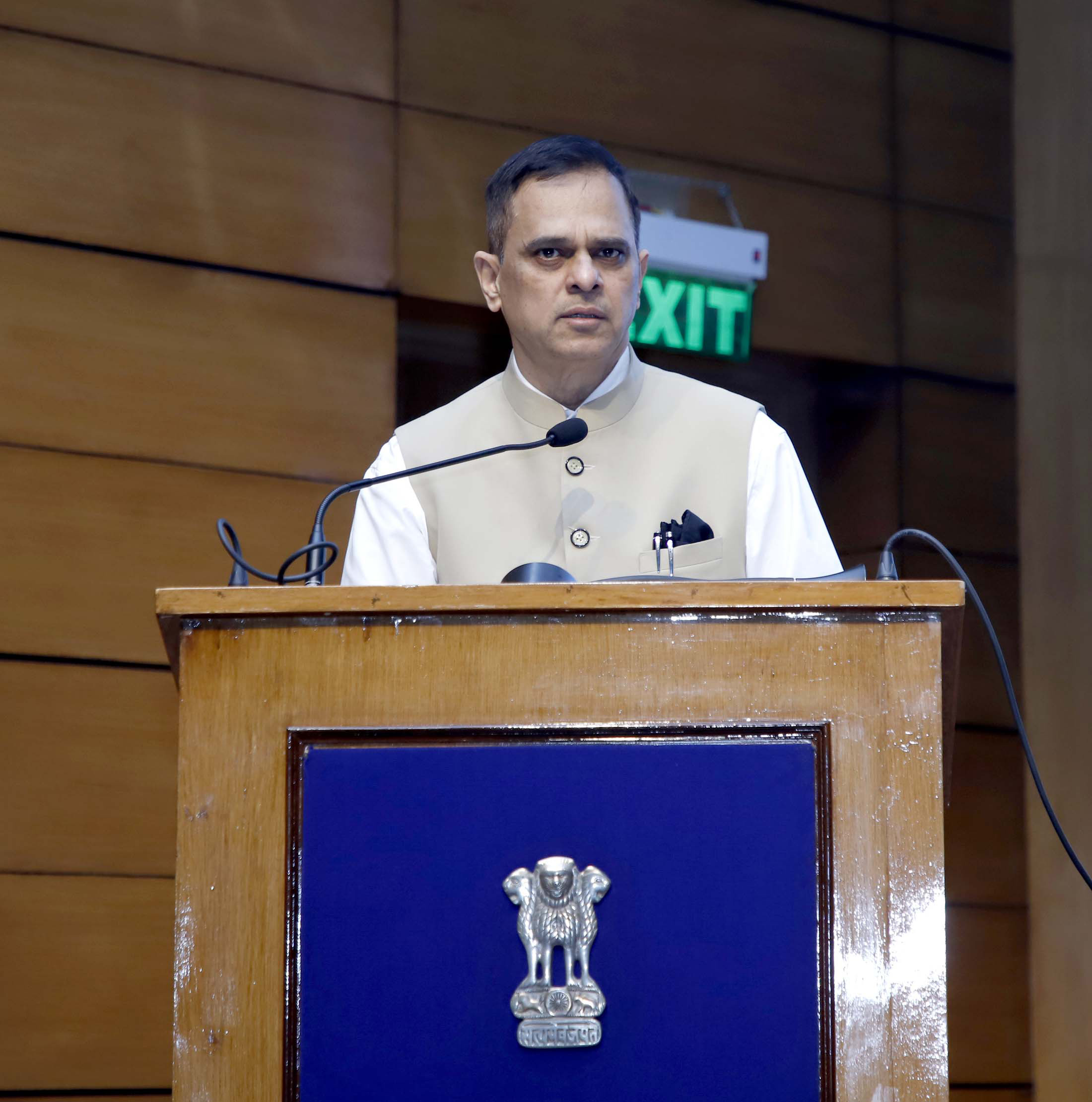
V. Srinivas

== Chief Secretary ==
Name	Assumed office	Left office
K. Radhakrishnan	13 April 1949	2 May 1950
V. Narainan	2 May 1950	1 September 1950
K. Radhakrishnan	1 September 1950	31 January 1951
S. W. Shiveshvarkar	8 February 1951	16 February 1953
B. G. Rao	16 February 1953	30 December 1954
Krishan Puri	30 December 1954	12 January 1957
K. N. Subramaniyam	11 March 1957	6 May 1958
Bhagwat Singh Mehta	9 May 1958	26 September 1964
Saanwal Dan Ujjwal	26 September 1964	16 January 1965
Bhagwat Singh Mehta	16 January 1965	29 October 1966
K. P. U. Menon	29 October 1966	22 October 1968
R. D. Mathur	22 October 1968	16 May 1969
Zorawar Singh Jhala	17 May 1969	9 August 1971
Sunder Lal Khurana	9 August 1971	23 June 1975
Mohan Mukherjee	7 July 1975	1 May 1977
R. D. Thapar	4 May 1977	22 June 1977
Mohan Mukherjee	22 June 1977	31 October 1977
Gopal Krishna Bhanot	28 November 1977	29 December 1980
Madan Mohan Kishan Wali	29 December 1980	20 February 1984
Anand Mohan Lal	21 February 1984	21 July 1985
Naresh Chandra	22 July 1985	9 March 1986
Vipin Bihari Lal Mathur	10 March 1986	31 January 1992
T. V. Ramnan	31 January 1992	31 August 1993
Govindji Mishra	31 August 1993	28 January 1994
H. M. Mathur	28 January 1994	2 February 1994
Meetha Lal Mehta	2 February 1994	31 December 1997
Arun Kumar	1 January 1998	31 December 1999
Inderjit Khanna	1 January 2000	26 December 2002
R. K. Nayar	26 December 2002	28 February 2005
Anil Vaish	28 February 2005	30 June 2007
D. C. Samant	30 June 2007	27 February 2009
Kushal Singh	27 February 2009	31 October 2009
T. Srinivasan	1 November 2009	31 August 2010
Salauddin Ahmad	31 August 2010	28 February 2012
C. K. Mathew	30 February 2012	13 December 2013
Rajiv Mehrishi	22 December 2013	28 October 2014
C. S. Rajan	31 October 2014	30 June 2016
O. P. Meena	30 June 2016	30 June 2017
Ashok Jain	30 June 2017	30 December 2017
N. C. Goyal	30 December 2017	30 April 2018
D. B. Gupta	30 April 2018	2 July 2020
Rajeeva Swarup	2 July 2020	31 October 2020
Niranjan Kumar Arya	1 November 2020	31 January 2022
Usha Sharma	1 February 2022	31 December 2023
Sudhansh Pant	1 January 2024	16 November 2025
Voruganti Srinivas	17 November 2025	Incumbent
