= Penpa Tsering =

Sikyong of the Tibetan Government in Exile

- སྤེན་པ་ཚེ་རིང་།
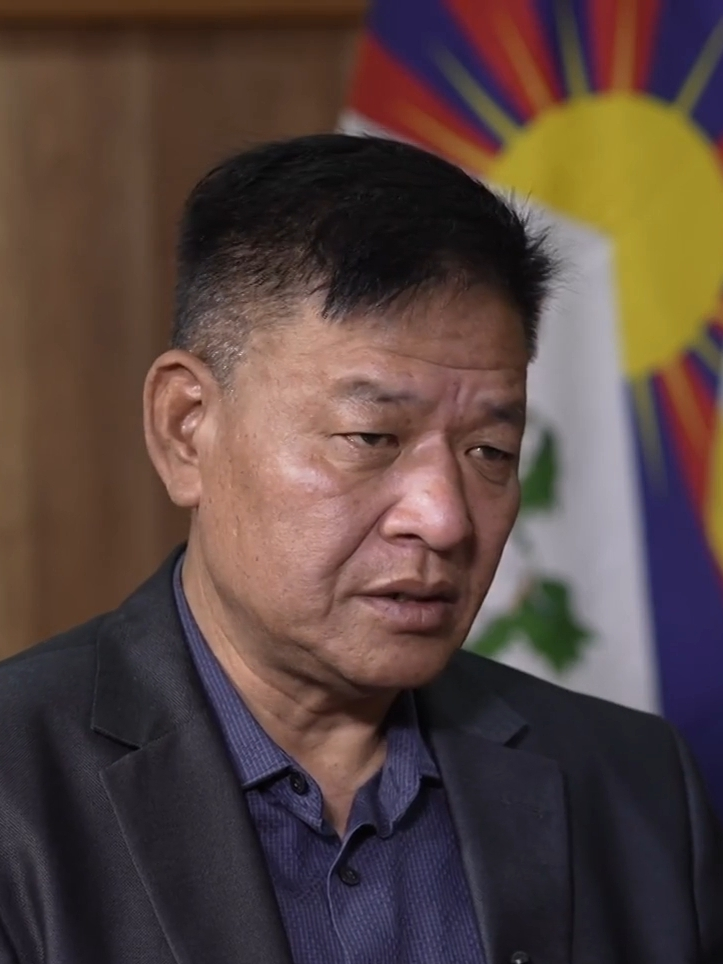
- Penpa Tsering in 2023

2nd Sikyong of the Central Tibetan Administration
- Incumbent
- Assumed office 27 May 2021
- Preceded by: Lobsang Sangay

Speaker of the Tibetan Parliament in Exile
- In office 2008–2016
- Monarch: 14th Dalai Lama
- Preceded by: Karma Chophel (14th TPiE)
- Succeeded by: Khenpo S Tenphel (16th TPiE)

Personal details
- Born: 1967 (age 58–59) Bylakuppe, Karnataka, India
- Citizenship: Tibetan in exile
- Party: National Democratic Party of Tibet/ Independent
- Education: Madras Christian College

Penpa Tsering (Tibetan: སྤེན་པ་ཚེ་རིང་།, Wylie: spen pa tshe ring) is a Tibetan politician based in India. He is the second democratically elected Sikyong of the Central Tibetan Administration in India. He succeeded the last Sikyong Lobsang Sangay on 27 May 2021. Penpa Tsering was the speaker of the Parliament of the Central Tibetan Administration (Tibetan Parliament in Exile) for two terms between 2008 and 2016.

== Early life ==
Penpa Tsering was born in a refugee camp in Bylakuppe in the Indian state of Karnataka in 1967. After topping his schooling, he graduated with Honours degree in economics from Madras Christian College. Following stints in the Tibetan Freedom Movement and the Nigerian-Tibet Friendship Association during his college days, he went on to serve as the executive director at the Tibetan Parliamentary and Policy Research Centre (TPPRC) in Delhi between 2001 and 2008. TPPRC is a joint project of the Friedrich Naumann Foundation and Assembly of Tibetan People’s Deputies, with a mandate of "promoting the political programme of the Tibetan administration".

== Political career ==
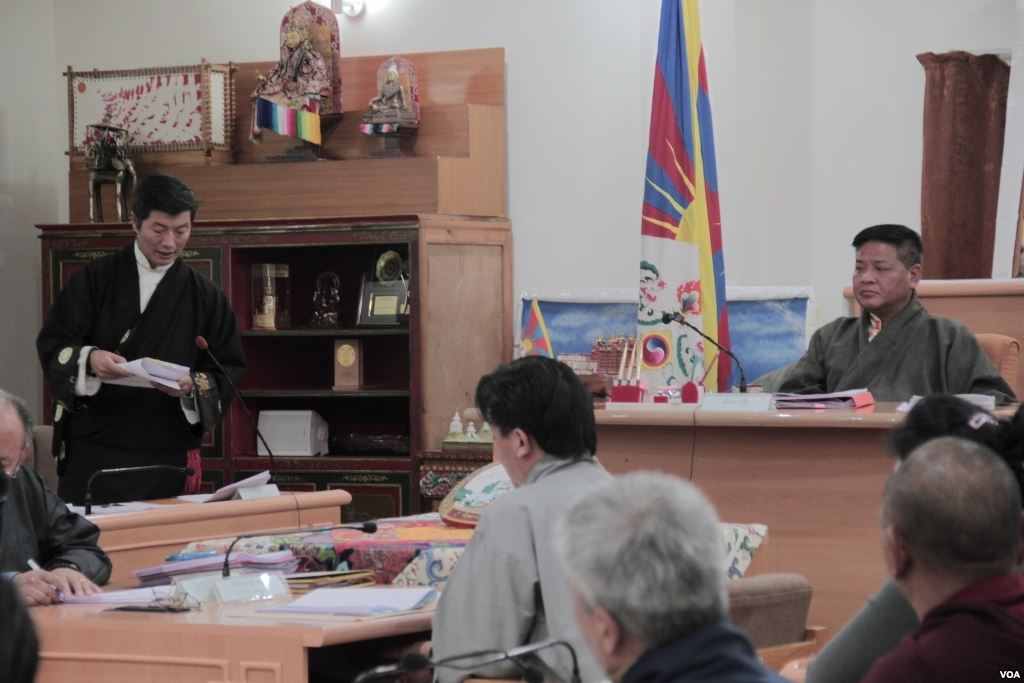
A session of the Tibetan Parliament in Dharamshala, 2013. Penpa Tsering, Speaker, is visible on the right. Lobsang Sangay on the left.

Penpa was elected to the Parliament of the Central Tibetan Administration (CTA) for two terms from 1996 and 2006. Following this he became the speaker of the 14th and 15th Parliament between 2008 and 2016. In July 2016, he was appointed the 'North America Representative of the Dalai Lama, Representative to Office of Tibet, Washington, D.C.' for a year. He formally took charge on 29 August 2016. As Representative, his duties involved meeting leaders and officials, chairing cultural events related to Tibet, and addressing Tibetans and Tibet related issues.

Penpa was runner up in the Sikyong election in 2016. He announced his candidacy for 2021 election on 3 September 2020. During the 2021 CTA general election, Penpa secured 34,324 votes, 5,417 more than Kaydor Aukatsang (Kelsang Dorjee Aukatsang) who secured the second highest votes; a total of 63,991 Tibetans voted. Penpa has spoken about "resolving the issue of Tibet", "taking care of the welfare of Tibetans in exile", pursuing "all possible ways to communicate with China," "facilitat(ing) a visit of the Dalai Lama to China," and advocating for the release of "Panchen Lama Gedhun Choekyi Nyima and all other political prisoners".

Penpa was sworn in as Sikyong on 27 May 2021 in the presence of the Dalai Lama who attended virtually. The oath was administered by Chief Justice Commissioner Sonam Norbu Dagpo. He often quotes the middle way and guidance of Dalai Lama.

On 28 May 2026, US official Riley Barnes congratulated Sikyong Penpa Tsering on his re-election as head of the Central Tibetan Administration, with leaders from Taiwan, India, and Australia also sending support. The statements underscored continued international backing for Tibetans living in exile amid China’s control and restrictions in Tibet.
