= Tenpa Yarphel =

Tibetan monk and politician-in-exile

Tenpa Yarphel (Tibetan: བསྟན་པ་ཡར་འཕེལ, Wylie: bstan-pa yar-vphel) is a Tibetan monk and politician. He is a member of the 16th Tibetan parliament-in-exile

== Early life ==
He was born in Kham area in eastern Tibet, and came to India in 2001. He attended Sera Je Monastic University, and Sarah Institute of Higher Studies in 2004 and 2008. He worked as an editor at the Department of Religion and Culture in Central Tibetan Administration(CTA) during which he edited literature on history of more than 300 monasteries in Tibet.

== Career ==
Ven. Yarphel landed in the eye of controversy over comment on ill-effects of relying on Nechung Oracle, which the monk claimed was an outdated, feudalistic practice in the governing systems of the 21st century. This raised backlash from the highly pious Tibetan community. HH 17th Karmapa, the head of Kagyu sect of which the monk belonged, criticized the monk. Irate Tibetan groups demanded his resignation from Tibetan exile politics.
