= World Organisation of Students and Youth =

The World Organisation of Students and Youth (WOSY) is an international student and youth organisation with India as headquarters. It was founded in Delhi on 29 October 1985. Currently, Mr. Nitin Sharma is the Chairperson of WOSY. Mr. Sharma works for a Swiss multinational company. He is also the International Coordinator of Human Rights working group under the Civil Societies 20 India. Mr. Shubham Goyal is the General Secretary of WOSY. Shubham, is a practicing advocate at the Delhi High Court.

== History ==
The World Organisation of Students and Youth was launched in Delhi on 29 October 1985 on the occasion of the International Youth Year Conference in the midst of 11,000 student delegates from fourteen countries. Atal Bihari Vajpayee, who would become Prime Minister after successfully contesting the Indian General Election of 1996, inaugurated the organisation. Air Chief Marshal Arjan Singh of the Indian Air Force and Swami Ranganathananda, thirteenth president of the Ramakrishna Math and Ramakrishna Mission, participated in the inaugural conference.

== Objectives ==
- International understanding and co-operation with the approach of "World is a Family"
- Propagating the United Nations' ideals of peace and co-existence.
- Bringing students and youth of the world together for the promotion of social justice and humanity.
- Helping the mobility of the students and youth to enable worldwide interaction of culture, information, knowledge and wisdom.
- Generating students and youth opinion and organising them for the fight against terrorism, religious fanaticism, apartheid, colonialism, racism, imperialism and oppression of any sort.
- Propagating humanism and spiritualism which, combined with a scientific outlook, may offer a viable philosophy of life for the world.

== Associate organisations ==
- Pragyik Vidyarthi Parishad, Nepal
- National Students' Forum, UK
- Tibetan Youth Congress, Dharmashala, India
- Tibetan National Congress, Dharmashala, India
- Friends Of Tibet, Dharmashala, India
- National Forum, South Africa
- Nigeria Youth and Students Organization (NYSO) Nigeria
- Akhil Bharatiya Vidyarthi Parishad, India

== See also ==
- One World Youth Project
- Student organisation
