= Dolma Tsering Teykhang =

Tibetan politician and teacher (born 1956)

- སྒྲོལ་མ་ཚེ་རིང་བཀྲས་ཁང
- Tsering in 2021

Speaker of the Parliament of the Central Tibetan Administration
- Incumbent
- Assumed office 31 May 2026
- Preceded by: Khenpo Sonam Tenphel

Deputy Speaker of the Parliament of the Central Tibetan Administration
- In office 8 October 2021 – 31 May 2026
- Preceded by: Acharya Yeshi Phuntsok
- Succeeded by: Khenpo Sonam Tenphel

Personal details
- Born: 1 July 1956 (age 70) Dêgên, Tibet Area
- Education: Central Tibetan School Administration
- Occupation: Politician,

Dolma Tsering Teykhang (Standard Tibetan: སྒྲོལ་མ་ཚེ་རིང་བཀྲས་ཁང, romanized: sgrol ma tshe ring bkras khang; born 1 July 1956) is a Tibetan teacher and politician, Speaker of the Parliament of the Central Tibetan Administration since 2026.

== Career ==
Dolma Tsering Teykhang was born on 1 July 1956 in Dêgên, Tibet Area. Few years later, her parents fled Tibet with her during the 1959 Tibetan uprising.

She completed her schooling and subsequently obtained a bachelor's degree and a teaching qualification. She has worked as a teacher in Tibetan schools for near thirty years and was member of the Utsang Central Executive Committee. In 2001, Tsering earned a Fulbright Program scholarship.

Tsering has been member of the Parliament of the Central Tibetan Administration for the Ü-Tsang region since she was elected in the 2001 general election.

According to Dolma Tsering Teykhang in 2016, after the destruction of part of the Larung Gar Buddhist Academy, five hundred nuns were sent for patriotic re-education, they were allegedly forced to sing "hymns of loyalty to communism".

After the 2021 general election, Tsering was elected Deputy Speaker of the Tibetan parliament. She has participated in diplomatic activities of the Tibetan diaspora, meeting with embassies and international organizations.
