= Khalid Iqbal =

Pakistani painter, teacher

- Born: 23 June 1929; British India (in modern-day Simla, India)
- Died: 19 June 2014 (aged 84); Model Town, Lahore, Pakistan
- Resting place: Model Town, Lahore
- Education: St Joseph's Academy, Dehradun
- Alma mater: St Joseph's Academy, Dehradun Forman Christian College Oriental College Slade School of Fine Art
- Known for: Painting
- Awards: Tamgha-e-Quaid-e-Azam by the Government of Pakistan (1977); Pride of Performance by the President of Pakistan (1980)

Khalid Iqbal (23 June 1929 – 19 June 2014) was a Pakistani painter, art teacher and professor emeritus, is widely recognized for landscape paintings as well as his natural forms paintings and portraits of Punjab, Pakistan.

The recipient of national awards such as the Pride of Performance and Tamgha-e-Quaid-e-Azam, he is sometimes referred to in the Pakistani media as "father of landscape painting".

== Biography ==
He was born on 23 June 1929 in British India (in modern-day Simla, India). He attended St Joseph's Academy, Dehradun where he obtained his O levels education. In 1949, he obtained bachelor's degree from Forman Christian College, and diploma in French in 1952 from the Oriental College. He took art classes in the evening at the Mayo School of Arts (now known as the National College of Arts).

He later worked as an art teacher at Aitchison College from 1949 to 1952, and subsequently went to England and attended Slade School of Fine Art to study fine arts from 1952 to 1955.

Later in 1956, he served as a lecturer at University of Punjab for Fine Arts Department.

Following the tenure of Shakir Ali, Iqbal also served as principal of National College of Arts (NCA), Lahore for 15 years till 1980. In 1993, he was honored with the Chair of Professor Emeritus at the National College of Arts.

== Awards and recognition ==
- Tamgha-e-Quaid-e-Azam (Medal of Quaid-e-Azam) by the Government of Pakistan for his contributions to painting in 1977.
- Pride of Performance Award by the President of Pakistan in 1980.

== Death and legacy ==
He suffered health complications and was subsequently admitted to the Ittefaq Hospital, at Model Town, Lahore and died of pneumonia on 14 June 2014.

His funeral was attended by some of his pupils and fellow painters including Nayyar Ali Dada, Saeed Akhtar, Ajaz Anwar and noted Pakistani news media personality Mustansar Hussain Tarar.

== Bibliography ==
- Ḥasan, Musarrat (2004). Khalid Iqbal: A Pioneer of Modern Realism in Pakistan. National College of Arts. p. 74. ISBN 978-969-0-01855-7.
