= Khenpo Sonam Tenphel =

Tibetan politician (b. 1974)

Ven. Khenpo Sonam Tenphel
- མཁན་པོ་བསོད་ནམས་བསྟན་འཕེལ
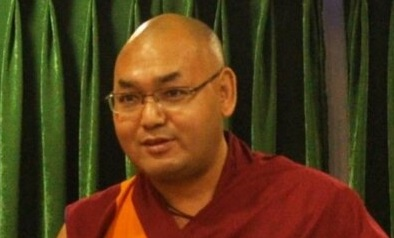
- Sonam in 2014

Deputy Speaker of the Parliament of the Central Tibetan Administration
- Incumbent
- Assumed office 31 May 2026
- Preceded by: Dolma Tsering Teykhang

Speaker of the Parliament of the Central Tibetan Administration
- In office 8 October 2021 – 31 May 2026
- Succeeded by: Dolma Tsering Teykhang

Speaker of the Parliament of the Central Tibetan Administration
- In office 30th May 2016 – 29th November 2018

Personal details
- Born: 18 July 1974 (age 52) Kham, Tibet Area
- Education: Ngagyur Nyingma Institute
- Occupation: Politician

Khenpo Sonam Tenphel (born 18 July 1974) is a Tibetan politician who is serving as Deputy Speaker of the Tibetan parliament-in-exile, the Parliament of the Central Tibetan Administration.

Sonam has been member of the Parliament of the Central Tibetan Administration for the Nyingma school of Tibetan Buddhism since he was elected in the 2006 general election, serving in the 14th Tibetan Parliament-in-Exile (TPiE) from 2006-2011. He was reelected a member of the TPiE in the 15th, 16th, 17th and 18th sessions.

He is the former Deputy Speaker of the 15th TPiE.

At the 2016 Central Tibetan Administration general election, he was elected as Speaker of the 16th TPiE, serving from 30 May 2016 to 30 November 2018

At the 2021 Central Tibetan Administration general election Sonam was elected Deputy Speaker of the 17th Tibetan parliament, serving from 8 October 2021 – 31 May 2026.

== Personal life ==
He was born in Rekhe, Kham region, Tibet. As a child, he studied at the Nari Tashi Choeling monastery. In 1993, he fled to India and received an audience with His Holiness the Dalai Lama. He joined the Ngagyur Nyingma Institute, a branch of the Namdroling Monastery, where he received a Bachelor's Degree and Master of Buddhist Philosophy from the institute. Since 2011 he has a Doctorate in Buddhist Philosophy (equivalent to a Doctor of Philosophy degree), and received a Khenpo title.
