= International Himalayan Festival =

Cultural festival held every year in the state of Himachal Pradesh

International Himalayan Festival is a festival that is held every year in the state of Himachal Pradesh, India to honour Dalai Lama, a recipient of the Nobel Peace Prize in 1985. This cultural festival is known for the performances by various groups from around Himachal Pradesh and sometimes other Himalayan regions as well. The festival is particularly significant as it symbolizes the peace initiative. The Festival is supported by the Indo-Tibetan Friendship Society alongside the Central Tibetan Administration and Himachal Pradesh Tourism. In 2018, it was held in Kangra district of Himachal Pradesh in the month of December.

== Celebrations ==
The festival is aimed at reinforcing the ties and harmony between the locals of Himachal Pradesh and the Tibetans living there. The main features of the International Himalayan Festival includes cultural shows and exhibitions, mainly by the artists of the Tibetan Institute of Performing Arts, local craftsmen, social groups and school children. One of the real attractions amid the International Himalayan Festival is the widespread stalls in the streets. Each stall speaks to the way of life, traditions of the state and display the local herbs and handicrafts of the inhabitants. Along the streets, there are various food stalls that offer delightful authentic delicacies. One can spend the whole day tasting these dishes. Different stalls in the festival feature the lifestyle, meticulous work, customary herbs, and cooking styles of the Himalayan area. Different cultural programs and shows are conducted as part of this grand festival. The showcase of its rich culture is certain to keep the sightseers stuck during this festival.

This festival is held at that time when snowflakes begin hitting the place. Since Himachal Pradesh is located in the lower region of Himalayas, the climate gets really chilly during the month of December. What's more, amid this celebration, tourists can invest energy getting a charge out of the conventional shows performed by the local residents. During these three days, the whole state of Himachal Pradesh observes an amicable mix of cultural programmes performed by different communities of the state. Tourists during this time get the chance to experience the rich culture that this place is blessed with.
