= 1960 Tibetan Parliament in Exile election =

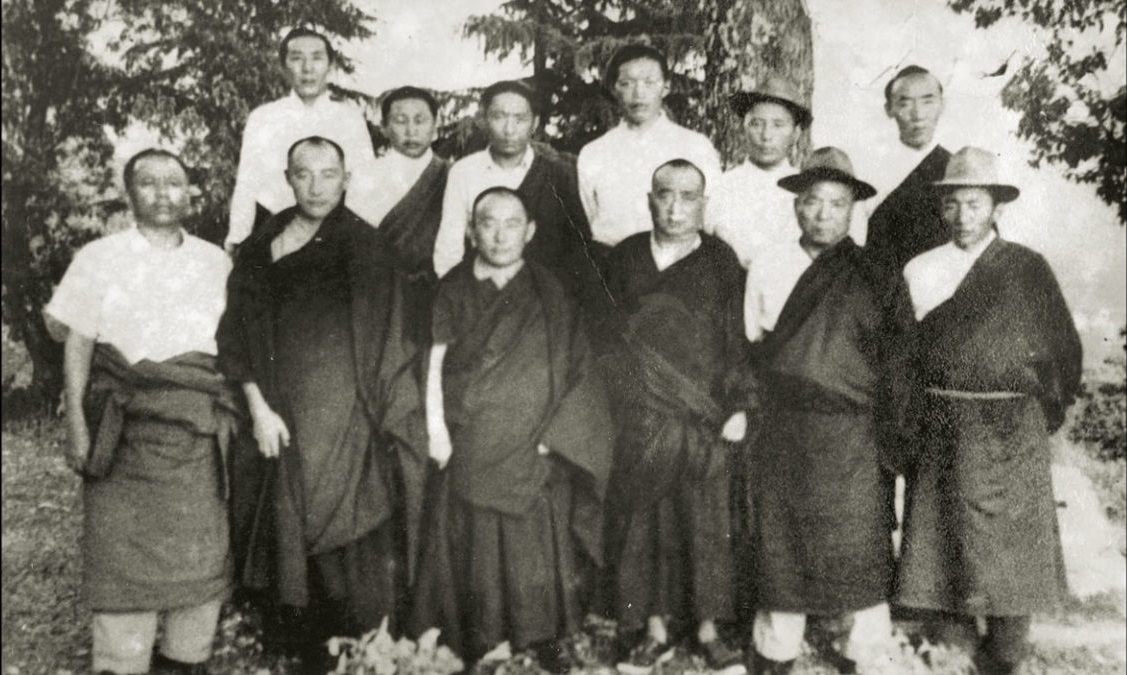
First Commission of Tibetan People's Deputies

The first election for the then named Tibetan Assembly was held on September 2, 1960, as part of a process of democratization of the Tibetan community encourage by the Dalai Lama. The election for Parliament was announced by the Dalai Lama in a trip to Bodh Gaya on January of the same year. This was the first time in history that Tibetans could elect their political leaders and September 2 is currently celebrate among the Tibetan diaspora as “Democracy Day”. One of the first decisions of the Assembly was to abolish all hereditary titles and functions of the old aristocracy, Buddhist hierarchy and tribal leaders declaring the equality of all Tibetans. Since that, other 15 assemblies have been elected.

== Composition ==
Seat	Member	Representation
1	Karma Thubten	Nyingma
2	Jheshong Tsewang Tamdin	Sakya
3	Atro Rinpoché Karma Shenphen Choekyi Dawa	Kagyu
4	Chiso Lobsang Namgyal	Gelug
5	Samkhar Tsering Wangdu	Ü-Tsang
6	Tamshul Dhedong Wangdi Dorje (Wangdue Dorjee)	
7	Phartsang Chukhor Kalsang Damdul	
8	Drawu Rinchen Tsering	Kham (Dhotoe)
9	Jangtsetsang Tsering Gonpo	
10	Sadutsang Lobsang Nyandak	
11	Alag Trigen Jamyang	Resigned, replaced by Tongkhor Trulku Lobsang Jangchub, Amdo (Dhomey)
12	Gungthang Tsultrim	
13	Gyalrong Trichu Dorje Pelsang	
