= St Joseph's Academy, Dehradun =

Coordinates: 30.3297173°N 78.0483449°E

St. Joseph's Academy, Dehradun
- Arms of the St. Joseph's Academy, Dehradun
- Rajpur Road; Dehradun; India

Information
- Motto: Laborare Est Orare (Work is Worship)
- Religious affiliation: Patrician Brothers
- Established: 1934
- Principal: Rev. Bro. Joseph M. Joseph.
- Gender: Co-educational
- Enrollment: 3500
- Houses: 4
- Publication: The Academician (Annual); The SJA Epistle (tri-annual)
- Affiliation: CISCE
- Website: stjosephacademy.in

St. Joseph's Academy, Dehradun (SJA) is a co-educational Indian Certificate of Secondary Education school in Dehradun, the capital of the state of Uttarakhand in India. Founded in 1934, the school is governed by the Society of the Brothers of St. Patrick (Ireland). It is located in the heart of the city of Dehradun on the main thoroughfare Rajpur Road.

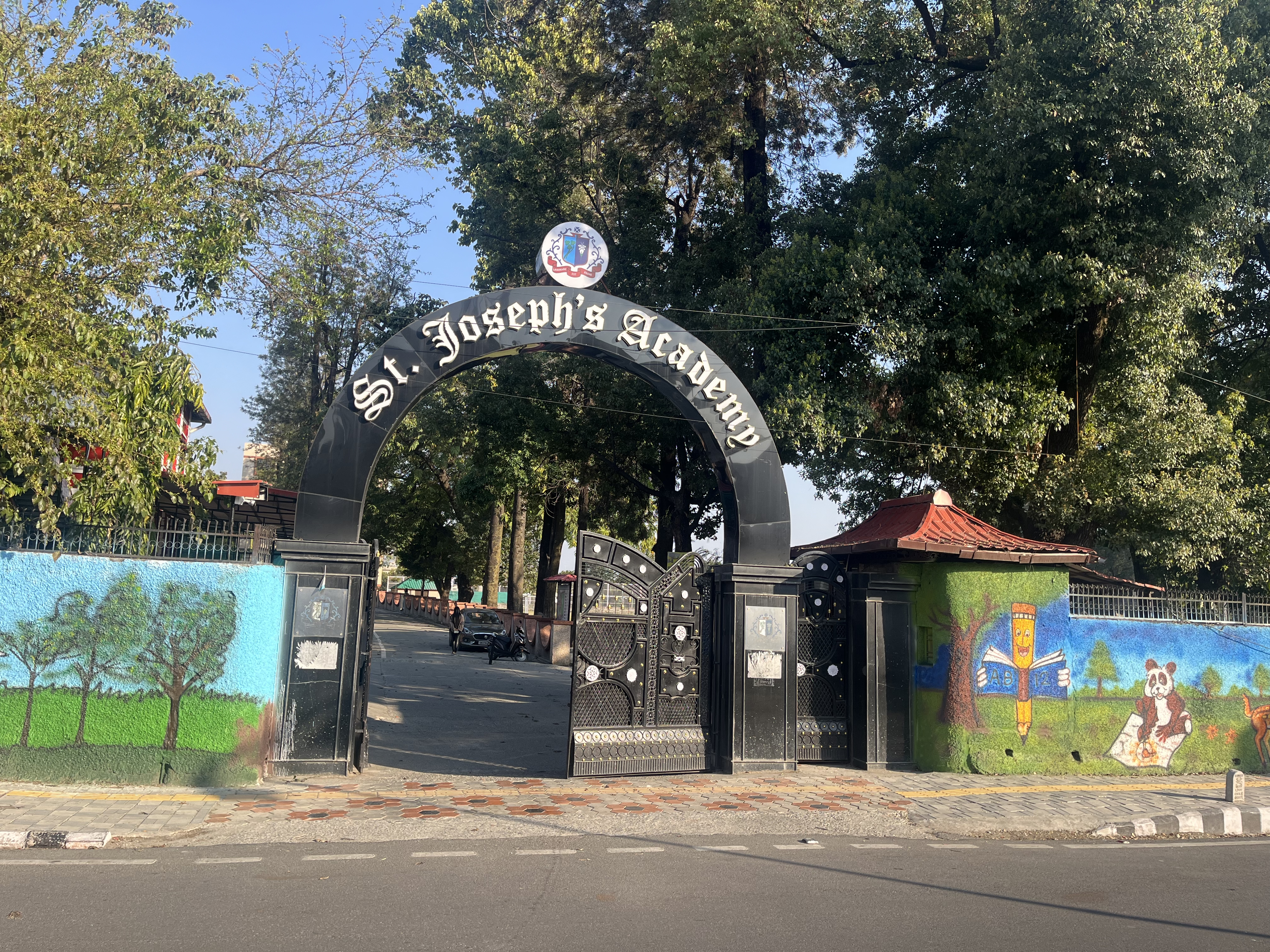
Entrance of the school

== History ==
St. Joseph's Academy was formally opened and blessed on 2 March 1934 by Rev. Fr. Antanasius. Rev. Bro. A.M. Keogh was the first principal of SJA. St. Joseph's Academy has an auditorium, built in 1984 and inaugurated by Mother Teresa.

In 2004 St. Joseph's completed 70 years, to commemorate the occasion, the play ‘Peter Pan’ was staged. The musical 'Joseph and the Amazing Technicolor Dreamcoat' was staged in 2006 and on the 80th anniversary the musical 'Anandsagar' was staged.

== Motto ==
The school motto (Latin) is "Laborare Est Orare", which means "Work is Worship".

== Academics ==
Until 1975, the school prepared students for the Senior Cambridge Examination for which, the answer scripts were sent to England. In the year 1976, the school officially became an affiliate of the Council for the Indian School Certificate Examinations, New Delhi, which conducts the Indian Certificate of Secondary Education Examination (ICSE - X) and the Indian School Certificate Examination (ISC - XII) Examinations.

== House system ==
The student body is divided into four houses. Events such as Cultural Week (Confluence), the Sports-Day and the House Cup are held each year.

The four houses, named after the former Principals of the school, are:

- Bergin (Blue)
- Donovan (Yellow)
- Dooley (Green)
- Duffy (Red)

== List of Principals ==
The following is a list of principals of the school, along with their years of service.

List of School Principals
Name	Years of service
BRO. A. M. KEOGH	1934
BRO. V. M. MCEVOY	1935–1937
BRO. X.W. HENDERSON	1938
BRO. A.M. MULVIHILL	1939–1941
BRO. C. J. BERGIN	1942–1944
BRO. V.M. MCEVOY	1945–1946
BRO. I. W. O'BRIEN	1947–1949
BRO. C.P. BURKE	1950–1952
BRO. A. P. DOOLEY	1953–1958, 1960–1962, 1966–1968
BRO. L.T. DINEEN	1959
BRO. M. K. DUFFY	1963–1965, 1972–1974
BRO. E. T. DUNNE	1969–1971
BRO. S. C. COFFEY	1975–1976
BRO. T. J. MULDOWNEY	1977–1982
BRO. J. C. CARROLL	1982–1988, 2002–2009
BRO. X. THONNIPARA	1988–1991
BRO. B. ATHAKKAD	1991–1993
BRO. B. VALLOCHERIL	1993–1997
BRO. DOMINIC JACOB	1997–2002
BRO. A. J. GEORGE	2009–2014
BRO. DENNIS JOSEPH	2014–2017
BRO. BABU VARGHESE	2017–2019
BRO. JEYASEELAN	2019–2024
BRO. JOSEPH M JOSEPH	2024–

== Notable alumni ==
The school has an official alumni association that has its own website.

- Abhimanyu Easwaran - Bengal Ranaji Captain
- Anirudh Thapa - Indian professional footballer
- Arvind Krishna - CEO of IBM
- Jubin Nautiyal - Indian playback singer
- Kaydor Aukatsang - Tibetan politician
- Navtej Sarna - author-columnist (IFS, former Ambassador to United States, High Commissioner to UK and Ambassador to Israel)
- Nitin Sahrawat - actor, environmentalist
- Prahlad Kakkar - Indian Marketing Guru & founder and key director for Genesis Film Productions, an Indian production house
- Pranati Rai Prakash - winner of India's next top model
- Prem Rawat - author and Global Peace Ambassador
- Rrahul Sudhir - actor
- Vijai Singh Shekhawat - Chief of Naval Staff of the Indian Navy
- Sudhansh Pant - IAS, Chief Secretary Rajasthan
