= Green Book (Tibetan document) =

Document issued by the Tibetan Government in Exile since 1971

The Green Book is a document issued since 1972 by the Central Tibetan Administration (commonly known as the Tibetan Government in Exile) to Tibetans living outside Tibet, and described by the issuing organization as "the most official document issued by the Tibetan Government in Exile." More than 90 percent of Tibetan exiles own one. It serves as a receipt book for the person's "voluntary taxes" to the CTA, and has been described by a CTA official as "the passport of the exiled Tibetans to claim their rights from the Tibetan Government in Exile". The CTA says that in the future, the document "will become the basis for claiming Tibetan citizenship".

The document is valid for five years. Stateless Tibetans in exile may use this document as proof of Tibetan identity when applying to the National Immigration Agency of Republic of China for residency in Taiwan.

== History ==
A system for collecting an annual "voluntary contribution" from the Tibetans in exile was introduced by the Central Tibetan Administration on 1 August 1972. On 3 March 2005 an updated Green Book format was launched by the CTA's Department of Finance; the document holders data are stored in a computer database that had been created in a project that had started two years previously.

=== Blue Book ===
The Green Book is issued only to Tibetan exiles, but starting in 1996 the CTA has also issued a Blue Book to non-citizens to raise funds for "the social and resource development fund". The official name is the Tibetan Solidarity Partnership project.

== Eligibility ==
As of 2010, the CTA web site states that "Any Tibetan who has aged 6 or more is obligated to apply for Green Book and become a full-fledged member of the exile Tibetan community. The Green Book affirms that the individual is a legitimate exile Tibetan who is affiliated to the Tibetan Exile Government."

For this purpose, CTA defines a Tibetan as "any person born in Tibet, or any person with one parent who was born in Tibet", and, as Tibetan refugees often lack documents attesting to their place of birth, the eligibility is usually established by an interview. Green Books have been issued since 1971. They are owned by more than 90 per cent of Tibetan refugees.

== Contributions ==
Before the issuance of the book, one is expected to pay an annual "voluntary tax" to the CTA. As of 2008, the tax is ₹58 (US$1.10) for adults residing in India, and US$44 for adult residents of the United States. The Green Book logs all the taxes the holder has paid. It is a major source of funding for the Central Tibetan Administration.

According to the CTA website, the rate is lower for students and the unemployed. But those in India, Nepal, and Bhutan who work for a salary are supposed to contribute 4% of their base salary or 2% of their gross salary (whichever is higher), whereas for those who had income other than salary, the suggested annual contribution was 0.15% of their net annual income.

== Benefits eligibility ==
According to the CTA, the Data Unit of the Department of Finance manages the central database of Green Book holders.

The holder of a green book needs to be current on their contributions in order to exercise such rights with the CTA as voting or standing for election, applying for scholarships awarded by the CTA, or for employment with the CTA.

The Green Book is not an international travel document. Those Tibetans who live in India but do not have Indian citizenship can receive a travel document from the Indian authorities. It was reported in 1994 that the process of applying for such a document typically starts with presenting one's Green Book (along with other documents) to the CTA office in Dharamsala, which then forwards one's application to the Indian authorities.
