= Kaydor Aukatsang =

Tibetian politician

- Aukatsang in 2015
- Born: Kelsang Dorjee Aukatsang; 1968 (age 57–58); Kalimpong
- Education: St. Augustine's School, Kalimpong; St Joseph's Academy, Dehradun; St. Stephen's College, Delhi (BA); Tufts University (MA)
- Occupation: Politician
- Spouse: Lhanze Nelung Aukatsang
- Parent(s): Jampa Kalden, former CTA Secretary of the Department of Security
- Relatives: Youdon Aukatsang

Kelsang Dorjee "Kaydor" Aukatsang (Tibetan: སྐལ་བཟང་རྡོ་རྗེ་ ༼སྐལ་རྡོར༽ དབུ་དཀར་ཚང་) is a Tibetan politician and candidate for the Central Tibetan Administration office of Sikyong. Kaydor was a close aide of the previous Sikyong, Dr. Lobsang Sangay, under whom he held various official positions including, the role of North America representative for the Dalai Lama, Chief Resilience Officer of the Central Tibetan Administration and the Director of the Social and Resource Development Fund (SARD).

== Early life ==
Aukatsang was born in Kalimpong in 1968. He was the son of Jampa Kalden Aukatsang, former Secretary of the Department of Security, CTA; and Dickyi Dolkar. Growing up, he attended SFF Tibetan School, Chakrata; St. Augustine's School, Kalimpong; and St Joseph's Academy, Dehradun.

== Education ==
From 1973 to 1975, studied at SFF Tibetan School, Chakrata, India, then, from 1975 to 1986, studied at St. Augustine’s School, Kalimpong, India; and from 1986 to 1988, he studied at St Joseph's Academy, Dehradun, India; In 1991, Aukatsang graduated with honors with a Bachelor of Arts in English Literature from the prestigious St. Stephen's College, Delhi.

From 1996 to 1998, he studied at The Fletcher School at Tufts University, Boston, USA, with a Master of Arts in Law and Diplomacy (MALD), focusing on international business relations and China studies. The course content includes finance, international business strategy and Chinese foreign policy (MALD).

== Career ==
Aukatsang has served a plethora of roles within various communities in the Tibetan diaspora including President of the Capital Area Tibetan Association, as well as President of the Tibetan Association of Northern California and Assistant to the Tibet Secretary-General Lobsang Sangay.

Within the CTA, Aukatsang held the roles of Special Advisor to the Sikyong, Representative of the Dalai Lama to North America, and Chief Resilience Officer of the CTA and the Director of the Social and Resource Development Fund (SARD) under incumbent Sikyong Lobsang Sangay’s administration. During his role as SARD officer, he managed to secure substantial grants and financial aids from USA and Canadian government for the CTA's coffers.

He was also previously a member of the Initial Steering Committee for the Global Philanthropy Forum, board member for the Tibet Justice Center, and International Advisory Committee member of The Mountain Institute. There, he participated in the 29th, 30th, 31st and 32nd meetings of the Task Force on Sino-Tibetan Dialogue as a Special Guest. Other positions he has held include Trustee of the Dalai Lama Trust (2013-2019), Honorary Chairman of Tibet House US (2013-2016), International Advisory Committee member of The Mountain Institute (2009-2012), Co-Chair of the Grantmakers Without Borders (2001–2003), Board member of Tibet Justice Center (2003-2004), Member of Initial Steering Committee of Global Philanthropy Forum (2001-2003).

== Sikyong campaign ==
On September 2, 2020, Aukatsang announced his candidacy for the office of Sikyong. After the primary election on January 8, Aukatsang has become one of the two leaders in the primary election. The top two candidates will go to the second round of voting in April. On December 4, 2020, Aukatsang confirmed that he had tested positive for the coronavirus, briefly halting his campaign. His rival Penpa Tsering, who leans on Middle Way policy and conservative section of the society, won the presidential race in May 2021.

== Post election activities ==
On 30 August 2021, Kaydor Aukatsang penned an article titled " Crisis of Leadership and Democracy in Peril" He is currently a nonresident Senior Fellow at the Atlantic Council.

== See also ==
- 2021 Central Tibetan Administration general election
- Sikyong
