= Rakesh Tewari =

Indian archaeologist

Rakesh Tewari (born 2 October 1953) now retired, served as the Director General of the Archaeological Survey of India (2014 - 2017), and was formerly Director, State Department of Archaeology, Uttar Pradesh from 1988 to 2013. He is an Indian citizen and was born in Sitapur district of Uttar Pradesh. His chief archaeological contribution is to demonstrate that rice was cultivated in the Indian subcontinent as early as the 9th millennium BP, in the site of Lahuradewa. He has also done research on the use of iron in the middle Ganga plains. He was succeeded by Usha Sharma.

Preceded by Pravin Srivastava	Director General of the Archaeological Survey of India; 2014-2017	Succeeded by Usha Sharma
