= People's Party of Tibet =

People's Party of Tibet བོད་ཀྱི་མིམང་ཆབསྲིད་ཚོགས་པ།
- President: Tenzin Rabgyal
- Founded: 2011
- Headquarters: Dharamsala, India
- Ideology: Liberalism; Middle Way Approach
- Political position: Center
- Seats in Parliament: 14 / 43

The People's Party of Tibet is a political party in the Tibetan government in exile, officially the Central Tibetan Administration, based in India. In May 2011, Tenzin Rabgyal founded the People's Party of Tibet in an effort to bring plurality to the democratic process for Tibetans. The party currently holds 14 seats in the Tibetan parliament.

The party endorsed Tashi Wangdu for the 2016 general election.
