= Dêgên =

Town in Baingoin County, Nagqu, Tibet, China

Coordinates: 30°30′N 90°5′E

Dêgên (Tibetan: བདེ་ཆེན་; Chinese: 德庆镇; pinyin: Déqìngzhèn) is a town of Baingoin County, Tibet Autonomous Region, People's Republic of China. It has a total area of 746.2 square kilometres (288.1 sq mi), and as of 2019 it had a registered population of 7,901 people.

It consists of the following eight village-level settlements: 那高查社区, 亚零村, 那色村, 加龙村, 乡那村, 南措村, 南美村, 保雄村.

Is the birthplace of the Tibetan politician Dolma Tsering Teykhang.
