= V. Srinivas =

Chief Secretary of Rajasthan

Voruganti Srinivas IAS
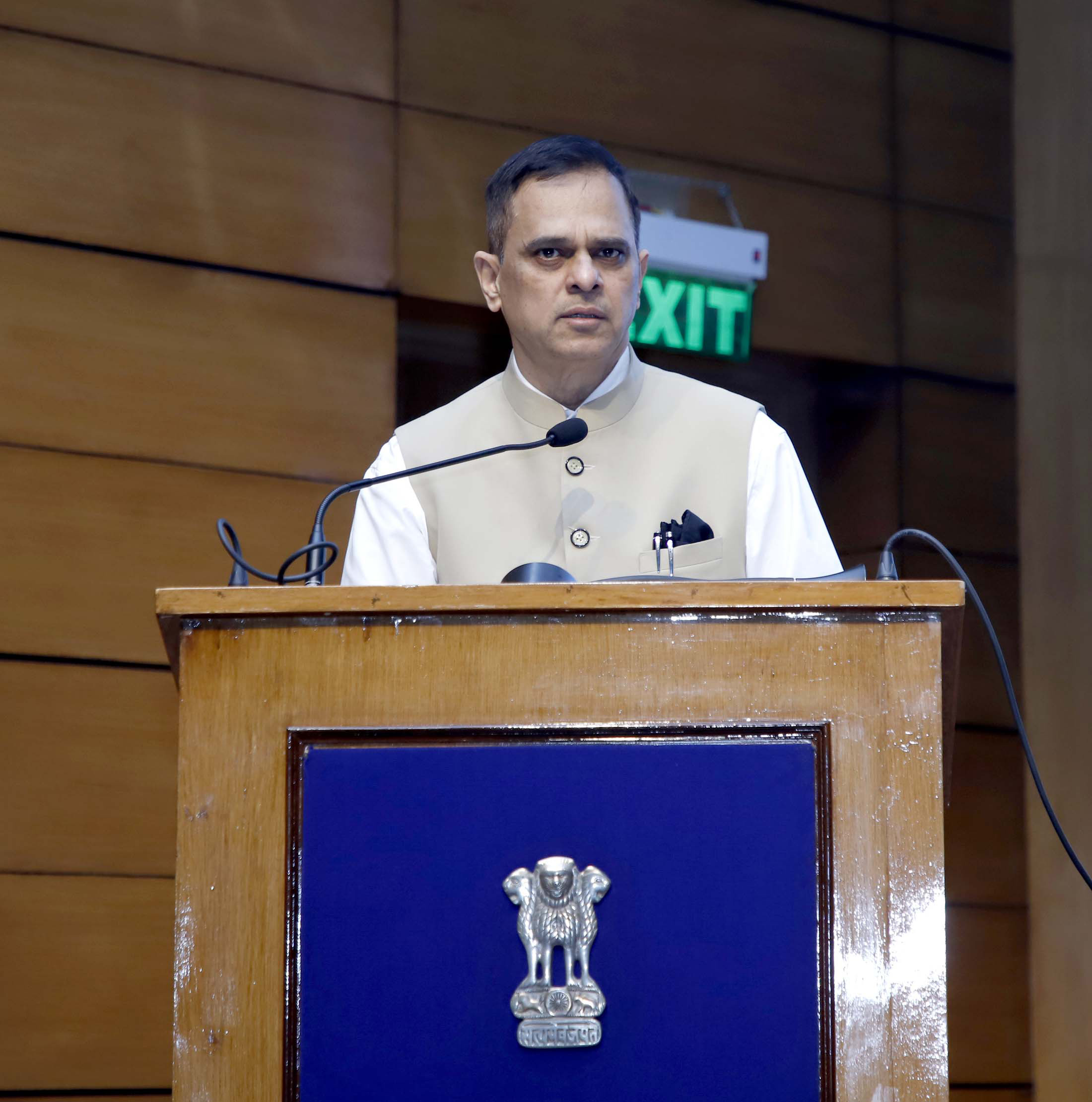

Chief Secretary Government of Rajasthan
- Incumbent
- Assumed office 17 November 2025
- Preceded by: Sudhansh Pant

Secretary of Ministry of Pension, Administrative Reforms and Grievances
- In office 1 December 2021 – 16 November 2025
- Preceded by: Sanjay Kumar Singh
- Succeeded by: Nivedita Shukla Verma

Personal details
- Born: 1 September 1966 (age 60) India
- Education: (B.Tech) (M.Tech); Osmania University

Voruganti Srinivas (born 1 September 1966) is an Indian Administrative Service (IAS) officer belonging to 1989 batch officer of the Rajasthan cadre and is currently serving as Chief Secretary of Rajasthan from 17 November 2025 onwards. He has served in various key posts in both Union and Rajasthan governments. Also, he served as President International Institute of Administrative Sciences from 2025 till 2028.
