= Lukar Jam Atsok =

Tibetan poet

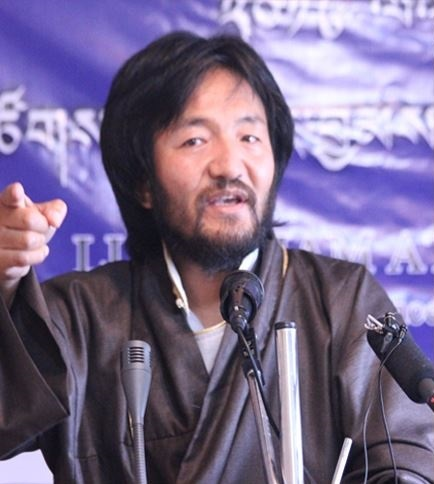
In April 2015, Lukar Jam announced his candidacy for the 2016 election of Sikyong

Lukar Jam Atsok or commonly Lukar Jam, born 1972, in Tsolho Dragkartri district, in Amdo, Tibet. He is a Tibetan refugee and political activist that ran for Prime Minister (Tibetan: Sikyong) of the Tibetan Government-in-Exile in Dharamshala, India in 2016. A former Chinese political prisoner, Lukar Jam went on to become President of the non-profit Gu-Chu-Sum, dedicated to the welfare of Tibetan political prisoners. He has worked as a civil servant with the Tibetan Government-in-Exile and currently lives in the Tibetan enclave of McLeod Ganj, high above Dharamsala, India in the western foothills of the Himalayas.

== Biography ==
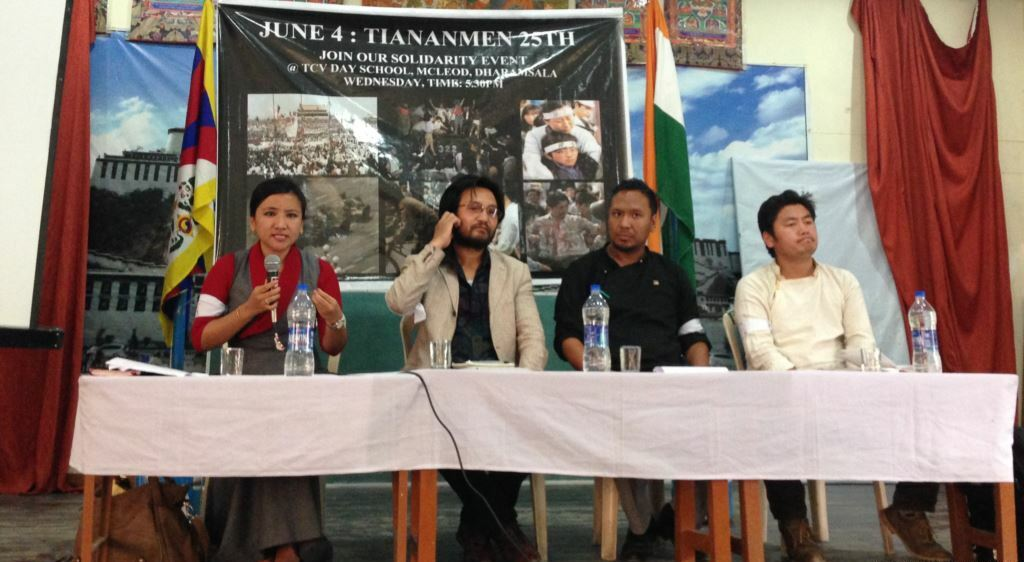
A Tibetan Tiananmen Square commemoration in June 2014, (Left to right) Tenzin Dhadon Sharling, Member of the Tibetan Parliament-in-Exile; Lukar Jam, Executive member of the Gu Chu Sum Movement of Tibet; Tenzin Jigme, President of the Tibetan Youth Congress; and Dorjee Tseten, Students for a Free Tibet Asia Director. Their talk was followed by the documentary ‘The Tank Man' and a call for the release of Liu Xiabo, prominent Chinese democracy activist and Uyghur Economist Ilham Tohti

The Chinese authorities arrested him in March 1993, together with his friends Tsegon Gyal and Namloyak, on his return to Tibet after studying for a year in India in a Tibetan school in exile. Unable to lead a normal life due to constant harassment, he decided to flee from Tibet, but was arrested on his way to exile in Dhingri County, Shigatse Prefecture.

After more than a year of detention in Shigatse Nyari and Seitru prisons in the Tibet Autonomous Region, the Intermediate People's Court sentenced him to 14 years imprisonment on accusations of "counter-revolutionary activities", "separatist activities" and of being the animator of "crimes against revolution." Mr. Lugar Jam was from Tsolho Dragkartri district where he was a businessman prior to his arrest. He was later detained in Terlengkha at the Public Security Bureau Detention Center. Tortured during his detention, he was released on 28 April 1995 for medical reasons after he fell seriously ill and weighing only 30 kg. He left Tibet after recovering from his illness and arrived in Dharamsala, India on 17 November 1997. He worked in the research and analysis wing of the Ministry of Security of the Central Tibetan Administration under the leadership of the 14th Dalai Lama until 5 March 2005. He later became President of Gu-Chu-Sum Movement of Tibet, an organization dedicated to the welfare of former political prisoners in Dharamsala, India. He is also a writer and a poet.

He was a candidate in the 2016 race for Tibetan Prime Minister and was the only candidate to openly support Tibetan independence and received the endorsement of the US non-profit Tibetan National Congress, a Tibetan political party advocating the independence of Tibet.

Lukar Jam was eliminated in the first round of the election similar to a primary. He was opposed to two other candidates Penpa Tsering and Harvard Law School graduate Lobsang Sangay who was elected.

In February 2017, he wrote a poem in honor of Professor Elliot Sperling who was known for his support of Tibetan national independence.

== See also ==
- Sikyong
- Tibetan Government-in-Exile
