= Michael Backman =

Australian-born writer

Michael Backman (born 19 September 1967) is an Australian-born writer who now resides in London. Much of his writing relates to Asia's economies, business, culture and politics. Later books have been on Asian art and history. He is also director of an eponymous art gallery in central London.

== Writing and ideas ==
Michael Backman has written widely about the ills faced by Asia's economies, arguing for greater scrutiny and transparency and denouncing official corruption. He argues that a free and well-resourced media is one way in which greater transparency and accountability can be brought about. His bluntness coupled with his knowledge of Asia has drawn both public praise and opprobrium from political leaders and others in Asia.

Another recurring theme of Backman's is that business people seeking to do business in Asia must understand the cultural and political context of Asia and not just business per se. Accordingly, his books have included chapters on the role of women in Asia, Islam, executions, and so on. Another theme is that Asian leaders must be accountable for their actions - to the citizens they are supposed to serve and that this is best guaranteed by an independent judiciary and a free media.

Backman's main book on corporate governance in Asia – Asian Eclipse – was described by one commentator in Hong Kong's South China Morning Post as "the most corrosive, devastating attack on Asian business practices I've ever seen. It was a real eye opener. I thought it was amazing stuff." Backman has said that legal advice prevented him from going even further. The Economist named it as one of the "finest" non-fiction books of the year. Said The Economist, "Backman really understands why business evolved the way it did in Asia". Praise also came from some surprising quarters. Thailand's then Prime Minister Thaksin Shinawatra included the book in his list of 109 books that all Thais should read. His books have been translated into Chinese, Indonesian and Spanish as well as being available in English.

Backman has also played a role in the debate over his native Australia's relationship with Asia. Rowan Callick writing in the Australian Financial Review described Backman as "the brilliant young writer on regional business strategies" and one of the fresh names to drive debate over Australia's future role in Asia.

Backman is not without his critics. The support he has offered Malaysia's former Prime Minister Mahathir Mohamad has been criticised for example. But then perhaps not surprisingly, Backman's support was quoted approvingly in a speech by Malaysia's then Transport Minister Ling Liong Sik.

== Early writing career ==
Backman has said that he first developed his interest in Asia while at university in Australia. Many of the other students were from Asia, particularly from Malaysia.

He first came to notice with the Australian Government's publication in 1995 of 'Overseas Chinese Business Networks in Asia' of which he was the principal. Although a government publication, it received wide international media coverage such as in the Financial Times. A reviewer in Fortune magazine recommended it in favour of John Naisbitt's Megatrends Asia. The Australian trade minister cited the report in the Far Eastern Economic Review as one of his favourite books of the year.

Backman left the Australian government shortly after to write more books. These have looked at culture, politics and business in Asia. A recent book, Asia Future Shock looks at what Asia will be like in the coming decades.

== On media restrictions ==
Backman has frequently criticised media restrictions in Asia. He has blamed many of Asia's political and economic problems on a lack of transparency and accountability. He said in a speech to the National Press Club in Canberra in 1999 in the middle of the Asian economic crisis that "If Asia had a little more bluntness – a little more truth – it would not be in the economic mess it is now."

In October 2003 in Singapore's Today newspaper, he wrote that the Singapore government should loosen up media restrictions. The column attracted many letters to the editor in favour from Singaporean readers. But shortly after Singapore's Minister for Information Lee Boon Yang accused Backman in a speech at a Singapore Press Club luncheon at Raffles Hotel of seeking to intervene in Singapore's domestic politics. He said that Backman had "knowingly crossed the line" with his remarks. Lee's claim was widely ridiculed, and was the subject of an editorial in the Wall Street Journal which said that Lee's assertion that Backman had sought to intervene in domestic politics showed that Singapore was politically repressed. It also said that the fact that Today published Backman's column showed that some in the Singapore media agreed with him and wanted to carve out more independence.

The affair was taken up by international media freedom watchdog Reporters Sans Frontières (Reporters without Borders) in its 2004 report on Singapore. Said the report:

Today, one of [Singapore’s] three English-language dailies, ran a column in October by Australian writer Michael Backman that was scathing about Singapore's system of censorship. He criticised the information minister's meddling in editorial content, the system of publication licences and the regime's paranoia. The government's reaction was acrimonious. In a response published five days later, the information ministry insisted that the media system was suited to Singapore's circumstances. At the start of November, information minister Lee Bon Yang told the Press Club that foreign journalists should stay out of Singapore's politics. He said Backman had knowingly crossed the line and meddled in internal politics.

== On President Suharto ==
Among Backman's research was his analysis of the Soeharto family's business empire. His figure of 1,251 companies in which members of the Soeharto family had significant interest has been widely quoted in media and studies around the world.

He has been critical of the degree to which academics in Australia were captured by Indonesia and were beholden to former President Soeharto's New Order regime.

He provided an affidavit on behalf of Time Magazine when it was sued in a Jakarta court by former President Soeharto for defamation over an article it published on 24 May 1999, called 'Suharto's Billions' in which Backman was quoted. Backman has since said that he did not support all of Time's findings in the article and that some he did not believe at all.

His book Asian Eclipse contains several chapters on the Soeharto family's business dealings. The link between Soeharto and Australia's then Prime Minister Paul Keating was examined too, leading to the matter being raised in the Australian Parliament. Senator Susan Knowles told the Parliament that Backman had raised in the book "extraordinarily important questions about the national interest".

== On Singapore ==
Singapore's then Prime Minister Goh Chok Tong quoted Backman in his 1998 National Day Rally Address calling him an expert in overseas Chinese. For his part Backman has often praised Singapore in his writing but he has also been critical. He admires Singapore's lack of corruption but has been deeply critical of what he sees as the Singapore government's petty harassment of opposition political figures and the degree to which it micro-manages Singapore. He wrote a series of columns for the Age following Singapore's elections in 2006 in which he was critical of the process. Each column was answered by a published letter by Eddie Teo, Singapore's High Commissioner to Australia, providing readers of the Age with an interesting debate of a type that Singapore's government tries to deny Singaporeans. Backman made this point in a column by pointing out that prior to his appointment as high commissioner to Australia, Teo was head of Singapore's Internal Security Department and so had spent his time denying Singaporeans a free media of a type that he was now taking advantage of in Australia.

Backman has also dismissed the Asian values debate as self-serving on the part of its proponents and has pointed out that those most identified with the debate – Singapore's leadership – are largely drawn from the baba or Straits Chinese community whose values draw on the paternalism of Victorian England rather than on Asia.

Nonetheless, Backman has held up Singapore as a model for the rest of Asia when it comes to Asia, and has said repeatedly that Singapore embarrasses the rest of Asia when it is claimed that corruption is an unavoidable part of Asian culture.

== Malaysia Bodoh controversy ==
Backman has written extensively about Malaysia, often favourably. However, in 2006, Backman penned a column for the Melbourne Age newspaper in which he questioned the Malaysian government's wasteful spending. Playing on Malaysia's national catchcry 'Malaysia Boleh! (Can!)’ Backman said that if the government did not change its ways then that would be 'Malaysia Bodoh! (Stupid!)’ The column was published as UMNO, Malaysia's ruling party, was holding its general assembly. Dissatisfaction with UMNO was growing in Malaysia and Backman's column was immediately spread widely in Malaysia and among expatriate Malaysians by the Internet. Journalists asked the then Trade Minister Rafidah Aziz what she thought of Backman's remarks. She said that she didn't care what Backman said because he was a foreigner and that she had better not catch a Malaysian saying such things. The minister's comments were reported in the Malaysian media and they caused still more anger among Malaysians annoyed that apparently a foreigner can comment on how Malaysia is run but Malaysians cannot. Meanwhile, the column continued to circulate and Backman reportedly received more than a thousand e-mails in support from Malaysians.

Shortly after the column was published, the term Malaysia Bodoh entered into popular Malaysian discourse. Malaysians critical of their government took to calling their country or at least its administration Bodohland and websites with political comment sprung up that made use of the terms boleh and bodoh as part of their domain names.

Backman had earlier penned a column in which he criticised Rafidah's allocation of permits to import cars into Malaysia. Then opposition leader Lim Kit Siang had quoted from Backman's article in the Malaysian Parliament to embarrass the minister.

Backman wrote more columns on Malaysia in the lead-up to and in the aftermath of the historic 2008 elections at which the Malaysian government achieved its worst result in fifty years. These two were widely distributed and cited by commentators within Malaysia.

== Bibliography ==
Books written by Michael Backman:

- Asia Future Shock: Business Crisis & Opportunity in the Coming Years (Palgrave Macmillan, 2008)
- Big in Asia: 30 Strategies for Business Success - with Charlotte Butler (Palgrave Macmillan, 2007)
- Inside Knowledge: Streetwise in Asia (Palgrave-Macmillan, 2005)
- The Asian Insider: Unconventional Wisdom for Asian Business (Palgrave Macmillan, 2004, 2006)
- Big in Asia: 25 Strategies for Business Success - with Charlotte Butler (Palgrave Macmillan, 2003, 2004)
- Asian Eclipse: Exposing the Dark Side of Business in Asia (John Wiley & Sons, 1999, 2001)
- Rare Antique Asian and Colonial Decorative Arts (Paul Holberton Publishing, 2016)
- Daim Zainuddin: Malaysia’s Revolutionary and Troubleshooter (River Books, 2018)
- Malay Silver and Gold: Courtly Splendour from Indonesia, Malaysia, Singapore, Brunei and Thailand (River Books, 2024)
