= National Democratic Party of Tibet =

National Democratic Party of Tibet བོད་ཀྱི་རྒྱལ་ཡོངས་མང་གཙོ་ཚོགས་པ།
- President: Tsetan Norbu
- Vice President: Karma Yangdup
- Founded: 2 September 1994
- Headquarters: Dharamsala, India
- Membership: 5,000 (worldwide)
- Ideology: Cultural conservatism Constitutional monarchism Tibetan nationalism
- Political position: Centre to centre-right
- Colours: Blue, red, white
- Seats in Parliament: 16 / 43

Party flag

- National Democratic Party of Tibet

Tibetan name
- Tibetan: བོད་ཀྱི་རྒྱལ་ཡོངས་མང་གཙོ་ཚོགས་པ
Transcriptions
- Wylie: bod-kyi rgyal-yongs mang-gtso tshogs-pa
- THL: Bökyi Gyelyong Mangtso Tsokpa
- Tibetan Pinyin: Poigyi Gyailyong Mangco Cogba
- Lhasa IPA: pʰỳːci cɛ̀ːjoŋ màŋt͡so t͡sóʔpa

The National Democratic Party of Tibet (NDPT) is a major party in the Tibetan government in exile, officially the Central Tibetan Administration, based in India.

It was founded on 2 September 1994, but the seeds of the party were planted by the 14th Dalai Lama at a meeting of the Tibetan Youth Congress in 1990. Based on that meeting, leaders of the congress began drawing up a constitution. Mr. TT Karma Chophel was elected the first President of the NDPT, and ten other executive members were chosen.

== Structure and activities ==
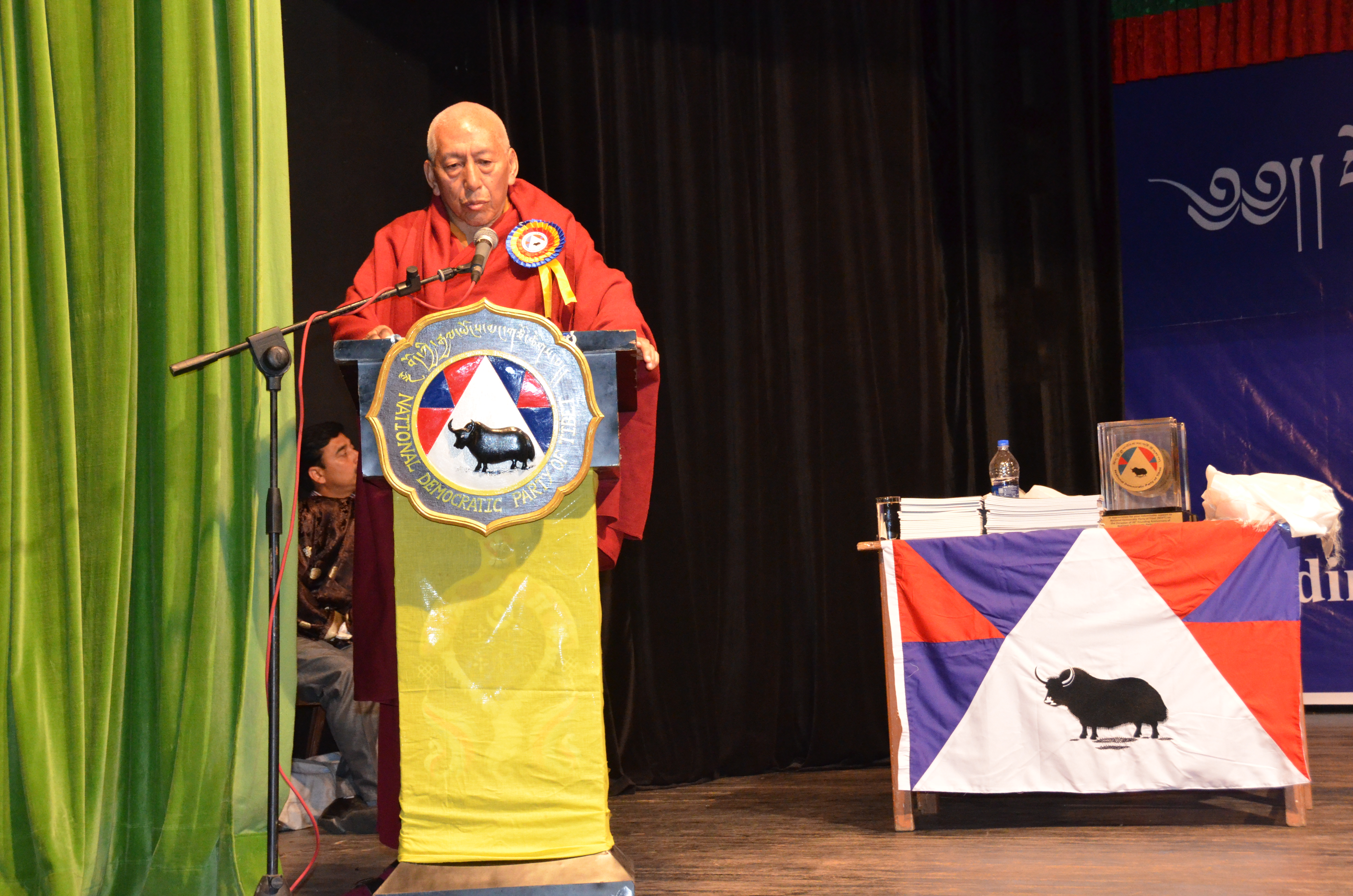
Samdhong Rinpoche at a National Democratic Party of Tibet event on 2 September 2014.

According to the party, its main aim and objectives are to prepare for the establishment of the political parties in a future Tibet, to promote democracy, to educate the Tibetan people about the significance of political parties, and to create awareness among the people about Tibetan issues.

In 2008, the party held workshops on democracy in Tibetan settlements located in remote parts of India, where the Tibetan community was taught about democracy as a value. In the 5th National Convention, the party passed a bill to support Tibetan political science students in different universities.

This party played an important role in arousing political discussions in exile. The party supported Dr. Lobsang Sangay both during the 2011 and 2016 Tibetan Election for Kalon Tripa, now termed Sikyong (Prime Minister) to head the Central Tibetan Administration. However, in 2016 the party nominated Speaker Penpa Tsering along with Dr. Sangay to provide wider choice to the Tibetan diaspora.

== Party leaders ==
- TT Karma Chophel (1994–1996)
- Kunga Tsering (1996–1997)
- Acharya Yeshi Phuntsok (1997–2000; 2000–2004)
- TT Karma Chophel (2004–2006)
- Chime Youngdung (2006–2012)
- Gelek Jamyang (2012–2016)
- Tsetan Norbu (2016–2019; 2019–2021)

== Opposition ==
In May 2011, Tenzin Rabgyal founded the People's Party of Tibet in an effort to bring plurality to the democratic process for Tibetans.

== See also ==
- Tibetan Communist Party
