= Meetha Lal Mehta =

Indian Civil Servant

- Born: 25 December 1938; Bhadsora, Rajasthan
- Died: 7 December 2014 (aged 75)
- Occupations: Social worker, civil servant
- Known for: Social service
- Awards: Padma Shri; Indira Gandhi Priyadarshni Vriksha Mitra Award; Acharya Jai Mal Gyan Award; Mewar Gaurav Award; Chanakya Award

Meetha Lal Mehta (25 December 1938 – 7 December 2014) was an Indian civil servant, a former Chief Secretary to the Government of Rajasthan and the founder chairman of Rajasthan Mission on Livelihoods (RMoL), a joint initiative by the Government of Rajasthan and UNDP for upgrading the livelihoods of the poorer sections of the people of the state. The Government of India honoured him in 2015 with the award of Padma Shri, the fourth highest Indian civilian award.

== Biography ==
Meetha Lal Mehta, born 1939, did his early college studies at the National Defence College in New Delhi from where he graduated in Physics and secured his master's degree from Rajasthan University. He continued his higher education at the University of London to obtain a post graduate diploma from in urbanization. Later, he entered Indian Administrative Service and became the Chief Secretary to the Government of Rajasthan. He served the state as the Chief Secretary during the ministry of Bhairon Singh Shekhawat from 2 February 1994 to 31 December 1997.

On his retirement from the civil service, Mehta became the chairman of Rajasthan Mission on Livelihoods (RMoL), a state sponsored initiative, partly funded by UNDP, for the betterment of the lives of the financially compromised people of Rajasthan. Under the aegis of this program, Mehta was known to have introduced many schemes, such as Apna Rickshaw Apne Naam Yojna, where the rickshaw pullers of the state were assisted to own their own vehicle. The project also arranged for redesigning their vehicle for better performance. He served as the additional secretary of the Ministry of Home Affairs in Rajasthan, as the director of National Bank for Agriculture and Rural Development (NABARD) and as the chairman of three state bodies such as the Compensation Committee, the Nomination and Remuneration Committee and the Audit Committee. He was the head of many state public undertakings like Rajasthan State Mines and Minerals (RSSM), Rajasthan State Co-operative Bank (RSCB), Rajasthan State Warehousing Corporation (RSWC), Spin Fed and Rajasthan knowledge Corporation Limited (RKCL). He was also a board member of the Reserve Bank of India and Prasar Bharati and a director of Vaibhav Global, a private enterprise doing business as an online retailer of fashion jewellery and lifestyle accessories till his death.

Mehta is a recipient of several awards such as Indira Gandhi Priyadarshni Vriksha Mitra Award (1986), Acharya Jai Mal Gyan Award (1988), Mewar Gaurav Award (1994) and Chanakya Award (2010). He died, aged 75, on 7 December 2014 at a private hospital in Mumbai, following the complications from a heart attack suffered a month earlier. The Government of India included him in the 2015 Republic Day honours list, posthumously, for the civilian award of Padma Shri.

== See also ==
- Reserve Bank of India
- National Bank for Agriculture and Rural Development
- Indian Administrative Service
- National Defence College
- Rajasthan University
- University of London
