= Sudhansh Pant =

Former Chief Secretary of Rajasthan

Sudhansh Pant IAS

Secretary of Ministry of Social Justice and Empowerment
- Incumbent
- Assumed office 1 December 2025
- Appointed by: Appointments Committee of the Cabinet
- Preceded by: Amit Yadav

Chief Secretary Government of Rajasthan
- In office 1 January 2024 – 11 November 2025
- Governor: Kalraj Mishra
- Preceded by: Usha Sharma (IAS)
- Succeeded by: Voruganti Srinivas

Union Health Secretary of India
- In office 1 August 2023 – 31 December 2023
- Preceded by: Rajesh Bhushan(IAS)
- Succeeded by: Apurva Chandra (IAS)

Personal details
- Born: 14 February 1967 (age 59) Lucknow, Uttar Pradesh
- Education: (B.Tech) IIT Kharagpur
- Occupation: Civil servant

Sudhansh Pant (born 14 February 1967) is an Indian Administrative Service officer of 1991 batch from Rajasthan cadre who is currently serving as the Secretary of Ministry of Social Justice and Empowerment of India since December 2025. He previously served as the Chief Secretary of Rajasthan from 2024 to 2025. Before that he served as the Health Secretary in the Health Ministry of India and has also served as OSD in the Ministry of Ports, Shipping and Waterways.
