= Usha Sharma (civil servant) =

Former Chief Secretary of Rajasthan

Chief Secretary Government of Rajasthan.
- In office 31 Jan 2022 – 31 December 2023
- Governor: Kalraj Mishra
- Preceded by: Niranjan Kumar Arya (IAS)
- Succeeded by: Sudhansh Pant

Director General of Archaeological Survey of India
- In office 2017–2020
- Preceded by: Rakesh Tewari
- Succeeded by: V.Vidyawati

Personal details
- Born: 26 June 1963 (age 62) Uttar Pradesh, India
- Education: B.Sc. (Hons.) in Chemistry
- Occupation: Retired IAS Officer

Usha Sharma (born 26 June 1963) is a retired Indian Administrative Service (IAS) officer who is former Chief Secretary Government of Rajasthan.She is the second woman to hold this post, after Smt. Kushal Singh. Sharma is CP Joshi’s( former Speaker, Rajasthan Legislative Assembly) sister-in-law.

== Early life and education ==
Usha Sharma was born on June 26, 1963, in Uttar Pradesh, India. She holds a B.Sc. (Hons.) degree in Chemistry.

== Career ==
Indian Administrative Service

Sharma joined the Rajasthan cadre of the Indian Administrative Service (IAS) in 1985.

Director General of Archaeological Survey of India

In 2017, Sharma was appointed as the Director General of the Archaeological Survey of India (ASI), an order issued by the Department of Personnel and Training (DoPT) on 22 July 2017. During her tenure, the ASI acquired a new headquarters building named Dharohar Bhawan, inaugurated by Prime Minister Narendra Modi in 2018. Sharma also oversaw the restoration of the Natamandap of Jagannath Temple in Odisha and the conservation of the Jagamohan of Sun Temple in Konark.

Chief Secretary of Rajasthan

Sharma served as the Director General of the ASI until 2020 when the state government appointed her as the Chief Secretary of Rajasthan and served there till 31 December 2023.

Preceded by Rakesh Tewari	Director General of the Archaeological Survey of India; 2017-2020	Succeeded by V Vidyawati
