= 2021 Central Tibetan Administration general election =

Tibetian election

- 18 October 2021 (first round); 20 March 2022 (second round)
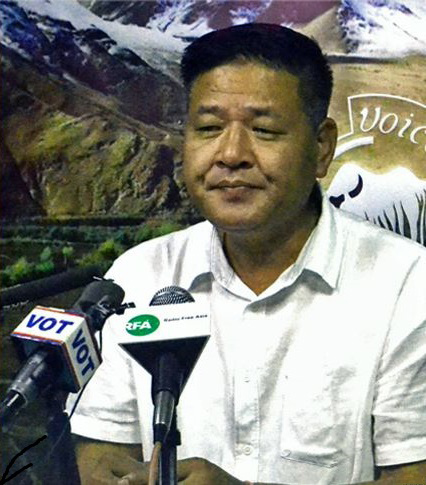

	First party	Second party
Candidate	Penpa Tsering	Kaydor Aukatsang
Party	Independent	Independent
First ballot	32,199	26,590
First percentage	55%	45%
Final percentage	65%	35%
Sikyong before election
Lobsang Sangay
National Democratic Party of Tibet
Elected Sikyong
Penpa Tsering
National Democratic Party of Tibet

The 2021 Central Tibetan Administration general election elected its next leader, the Sikyong, for the Central Tibetan Administration, a government-in-exile of Tibet based in India. Candidate Penpa Tsering won the election and succeeded Dr. Lobsang Sangay, who had served two consecutive terms as Sikyong.

== Candidates ==
The first Tibetans to publicly announce their proposed candidacy for the position were former minister Dolma Gyari; former minister, representative of the Dalai Lama in America and acting president of the Tibet Fund Lobsang Nyandak; and member of parliament Acharya Yeshi Phuntsok.

Kelsang Dorjee Aukatsang, Tashi Wangdu, and Penpa Tsering then announced their candidacies on 2 September 2020. Ngodup Dongchung announced his candidacy on 9 September, and Tashi Topgyal on 10 September.

== Background ==
Throughout 2020, a civil society initiative called Smartvote Tibet invited Tibetans to submit questions for Sikyong and MP candidates in order to build an informed electorate. Smartvote Tibet is an initiative formed by a group of Tibetans. the candidates answer questions submitted on a wide range of current issues. Then, voters can answer the same set of questions, after which they receive a list of candidates who best match their preferences.

The project Smartvote Tibet was covered by Tibetan media outlets such as Radio Free Europe, Voice of Tibet and Phayul.

== History ==
Hundreds of voters, most wearing facemasks, using hand sanitizer, and maintaining social distancing, voted in Dharamshala, India.

Following the primary, the two Sikyong candidates receiving the highest vote share move on to the second round. The date for the second round was set for 20 March.

== See also ==
- Central Tibetan Administration
