= Parliament of the Central Tibetan Administration =

Unicameral legislature of the government-in-exile of Tibet

Parliament of the Central Tibetan Administration གྲོས་ཚོགས་ཐོག་གསུང་བཤད།
- 17th Tibetan Parliament

Type
- Type: Unicameral
- Term limits: None

History
- New session started: 2026

Leadership
- Speaker: Dolma Tsering Teykhang since 31 May 2026
- Deputy Speaker: Khenpo Sonam Tenphel since 31 May 2026

Structure
- Seats: 45
- Political groups: NDPT (16); PPT (14); Four schools + Bön (13)
- Length of term: 5 years

Elections
- Voting system: Plurality block voting
- Last election: 2026
- Next election: 2031

Meeting place
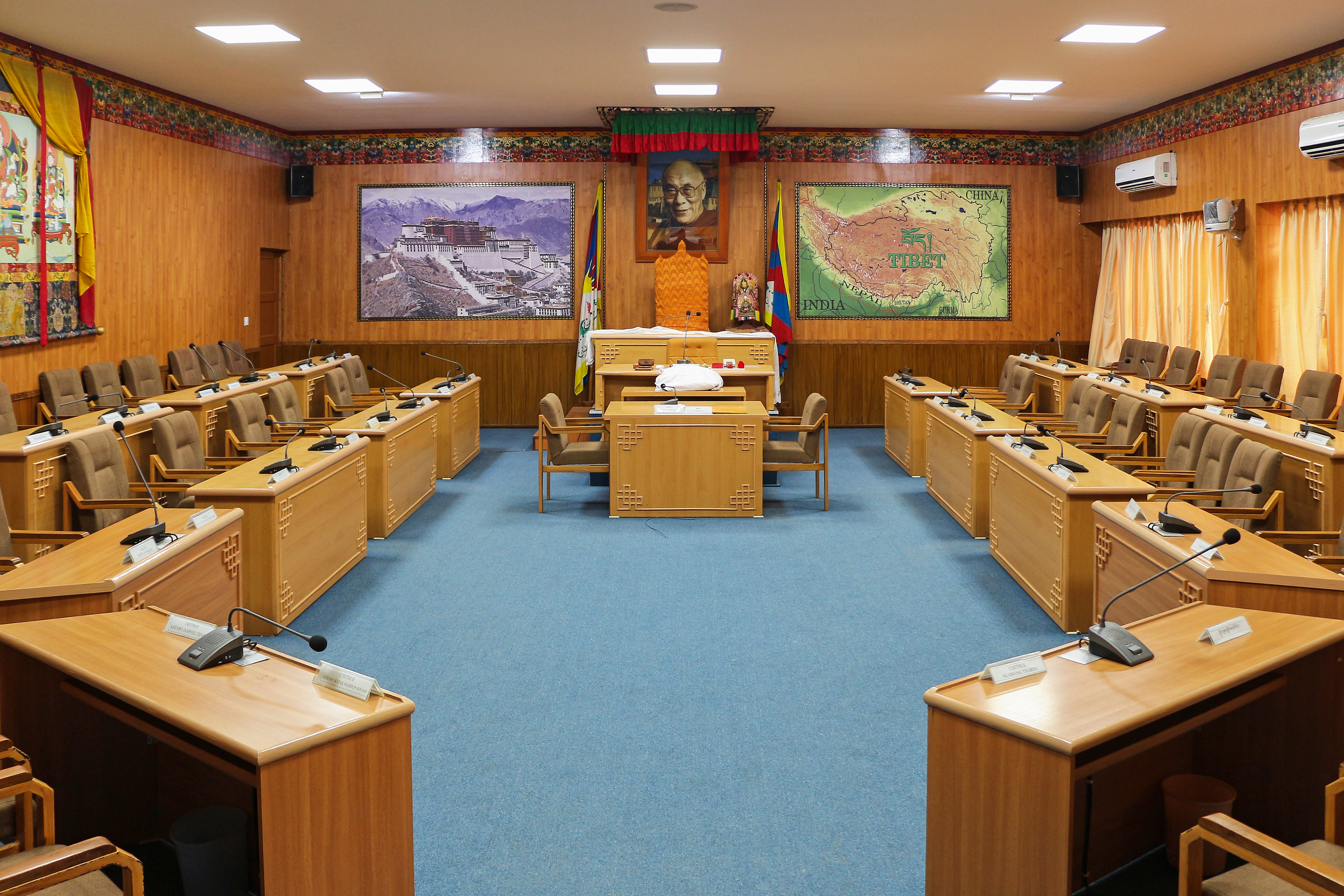
- Building of Central Tibetan Administration, Dharamshala, Himachal Pradesh, India

Website
- tibetanparliament.org

The Tibetan Parliament in Exile (TPiE), officially the Parliament of the Central Tibetan Administration, is the unicameral and highest legislative organ of the Central Tibetan Administration. It was established and is based in Dharamshala, India. The creation of this democratically elected body has been one of the major changes that the 14th Dalai Lama brought about in his efforts to introduce a democratic system of administration.

Today, the parliament consists of 45 members: ten members each from Ü-Tsang, Kham, and Amdo, the three traditional provinces of Tibet; the four major schools of Tibetan Buddhism and the traditional Bön faith elect two members each; five members are elected by Tibetans in the west: two from Europe, one from Australasia, one from North America and one from Canada. The Tibetan Parliament in Exile is headed by a Speaker and a Deputy Speaker, who are elected by the members amongst themselves. Any Tibetan who has reached the age of 25 has the right to contest elections to the parliament.

The elections are held every five years and any Tibetan who has reached the age of 18 is entitled to vote. Sessions of the parliament are held twice every year, with an interval of six months between the sessions. When the parliament is not in session, there is a standing committee of eleven members: two members from each province, one member from each religious denomination. The members of the parliament undertake periodic tours to Tibetan settlements to make an assessment of people's overall conditions. On their return, they bring to the notice of the administration all the grievances and matters which need attention. The Tibetan Parliament in Exile also keeps in touch with people through local parliaments established in thirty-eight major Tibetan communities. The Charter provides for the establishment of a local parliament in communities having a population of at least 160.

Local parliaments are scaled-down replicas of the Tibetan Parliament in Exile. They keep an eye on the activities of their respective settlement/welfare officers. They also make laws for their respective communities according to the latter's felt-needs. Laws passed by local parliaments must be implemented by their respective settlement/welfare officers.

== Historical background ==
=== Background (before 1959) ===
The Dalai Lama had, in fact, initiated the process of democratization in Tibet itself. In his autobiography "My Land and My People", he recalls how he appointed a Reforms Committee of eminent citizens to redress the inequalities prevailing in Tibet at the time; but the reforms were obstructed by the Chinese invasion. In his foreword to the constitution for Tibet drafted in 1963, the Dalai Lama stated: "Even prior to my departure from Tibet in March 1959, I had come to the conclusion that in the changing circumstances of the modern world, the system of governance in Tibet must be modified and amended so as to allow the elected representatives of the people to play a more effective role in guiding and shaping the social and economic policies of the State. I also firmly believed that this could only be done through democratic institutions based on social and economic justice."

Before the Chinese occupation of Tibet, important decisions were taken by the Tsogdu (National Assembly), in which monks and other societal groups were represented along with the Kalons (Cabinet Minister) and other officials. Though, no direct elections were held, rather, members were selected as representatives of communities and trade groups. Thus, the Tsogdu was made up of the abbots of the three great monasteries and lay representatives of various classes and professions such as: artisans, tradesmen, soldiers and boatmen. Thus, the Tibetans had little or no experience of democratic governance when they came to India. However, one of the first pronouncements made by the Dalai Lama after arriving in India showed that he had already envisaged a process of democratization that would maintain close links with the land from which the Tibetans had been forced to flee.

=== Establishment of the Commission of Tibetan People's Deputies ===
In February 1960, at Bodh Gaya (where Buddha achieved enlightenment), the Dalai Lama outlined a detailed program designed to introduce the exiled Tibetans about the practice of democratic. He advised them to set up an elected body with three exile representatives each from the three provinces and one each from the four religious schools of Tibetan Buddhism. Elections were duly held and the first elected representative body in Tibetan's history "The Commission of Tibetan People's Deputies (CTPD)" took oath on 2 September 1960. This historic date is observed by the Tibetan exile community as Tibetan Democracy Day.

On 4 September 1960, the Dalai Lama explained to the elected members about the importance of fully functioning polity which should be rooted in traditional values but adapted to the widely accepted modern democratic system of governance. With this end in view, the Dalai Lama provided the agenda for the meeting. For the first time ever, a weeklong joint meeting of the elected Deputies and Cabinet Minister was held to discuss the positive aspects and the shortcomings of the existing Tibetan polity, the future course of action, the expansion of the existing departments of the Central Tibetan Administration and the appointment of civil servants. The members proposed a list of 29 names to administer the Councils for Religion, Home, Foreign Relations, and Education; the Office of Finance, Information and Security, as well as the Civil Service Commission.

However, the Commission at that time had no secretariat and the facilities for its functioning were limited. The Deputies were engaged to various departments of the Central Tibetan Administration (CTA) to gain an experience, while the supervision of the infant administration was entrusted to the Dalai Lama and the Kalons. This practice was followed till the Fourth CTPD. The Deputies met twice each month to assess the situation and discuss important issues. The Deputies, members of the Kashag (Cabinet) and the administrative heads of the departments met as the National Working Committee once every six months to present reports and review activities. The Chairmanship was on the rotation basis among the members.

=== 1963 "Constitution" ===
On 10 March 1961, the 2nd anniversary of the Tibetan National Uprising Day, the Dalai Lama formulated a draft constitution of Tibet; he sought views from the people and their elected representatives to suggest amendments and for the improvement.

On 10 October 1961, a synoptic version of a draft constitution was circulated among the Tibetan diaspora. Settlement Officer, the Deputies and the civil servants unanimously appreciated it and pledged to follow its provisions, which incorporated traditional Tibetan values within modern democratic norms. However, they expressed inability to accept the provisions which curtailed the powers of the Dalai Lama.

Eventually, on 10 March 1963, the Dalai Lama promulgated a constitution consisting of 10 chapters and 77 articles. He also made structural changes to the governmental institutions and the appointment of civil servants. The term of the elected Assembly Deputies was set at three years. It was also decided that there should be an elected chairman and a Vice Chairman of the commission. On 8 February 1964, rules were also framed concerning the election and terms of office for a three Gharthue (Local Assembly Members) in the larger settlements. The members were to be a representative from each of the three provinces elected directly by the people to assist the Settlement Officer in overseeing development activities.

For the Second and Third CTPD, the total strength of the elected representatives was increased from 13 to 17 with one additional seat reserved for a woman from each of the three provinces, while the Dalai Lama began nominating an eminent Tibetan as per the new constitution.

In 1965, the role of the Deputies was enhanced when the commission was entrusted with the authority to abolish the traditional practice of appointing both monks and lay officials to each office, and to abolish the various hereditary titles and prerogatives. The CTPD restructured the rules of public service and framed new ranks and designations. By the end of the Third CTPD's term in 1969, the Deputies had been authorized to oversee the work of the CTA's departments. On 3 May 1966, a separate Commission house and secretariat was set up. The Commission meets twice a month, and the presentation of bi-annual report and reviewing the meeting of the National Working Committee continued.

On 10 March 1970, the First Annual General Meeting (replacing the biannual meetings) was held in conjunction with the anniversary of the Tibetan National Uprising Day. People's representatives, administrators at all levels and monastic representatives participated in this meeting. This practice was followed till 1981. The first photo exhibition to showcase the achievements of the Tibetan refugees in agriculture, animal husbandry, cottage industries and religious institution was also held alongside. The Deputies held their Commission sessions, scrutinized the work reports of the CTA departments and held the Kashag responsible for lapses in redressing public grievances. The commission, thus, acted as a bridge between the people and the CTA.During the Fourth and Fifth CTPD, the Dalai Lama did not nominate any members in the Assembly; hence, the number of Deputies came down to 16.

In 1972, a group of public-spirited Tibetans from Varanasi approached the administration with a ten-point memorandum and sought permission to visit the settlements to rouse the Tibetan public's support to their action plan for the cause of Tibet's freedom. The permission was granted and in July 1972, the preliminary convention of the Tibetan Freedom Movement was held. In order to strengthen their legitimizing bond with the CTA, all Tibetans above the age of six were obliged to pay at least one rupee per month as a form of voluntary contribution. For this purpose the Tibetan Freedom Movement sub-committee, known as Bhod Rawang Denpai Legul (BRDL) was set up in each Tibetan community across the world. This formalized the commitment of the entire exiled community to the democratic functioning of the CTA, including their participation and responsibility for it. The members of the Tibetan Freedom Movement sub-committees replaced the Gharthue.

In 1973, during the Fifth CTPD, the Fourth Annual General Meeting was held in conjunction with the second photo exhibition. In the same year on 25 August, new rules for the recruitment, appointment and transfer of civil servants was framed and announced.

Till the Fifth CTPD, the Election Commission adopted many different ways and means to elect the Deputies of the CTPD. In 1974, the election system was reviewed and positive elements from the Indian electoral system were incorporated. On 21 November 1974, a new set of electoral rules was put into the place; it includes the seats reservation for women in CTPD.

Till 1975, the Kashag was fully responsible for the budget of the departments and there was no financial accountability to the CTPD. In 1975, new rules were framed regarding the control of the CTA's budget. It was decided that the income and expenditure of all the departments of the CTA should be approved and sanctioned during the annual meeting of the National Working Committee chaired by the Chairman of CTPD. In the same year, during the National Annual General Meeting, it was decided that the 2nd day of September should be commemorated annually as the founding day of Tibetan Democracy and declared a national holiday.

In 1977, during the 8th Annual General Meeting, the 3rd Photo Exhibition of the Tibetan diaspora was held. In the same year, the budget session was held on 1 February for the coming financial year which starts from 1 April every year. On 5 October 1977, In addition to the four Tibetan Buddhist schools, followers of the Bon religion also came to have a separate Deputy, hence, the strength of Deputies were increased to 17 during the 6th and 7th CTPD.

=== The Assembly of Tibetan People's Deputies and electoral reforms ===
In 1979, the term of the Cabinet Ministers was fixed for 5 years, and the Dalai Lama was entrusted to appoint or dismiss any of the Cabinet Ministers. At the time of the 6th CTPD session, the Commission of Tibetan People's Deputies (CTPD) was renamed as the Assembly of Tibetan People's Deputies (ATPD).

It was decided during the Annual General Meeting of 1981 that this meeting would now be held once every two years rather than annually.

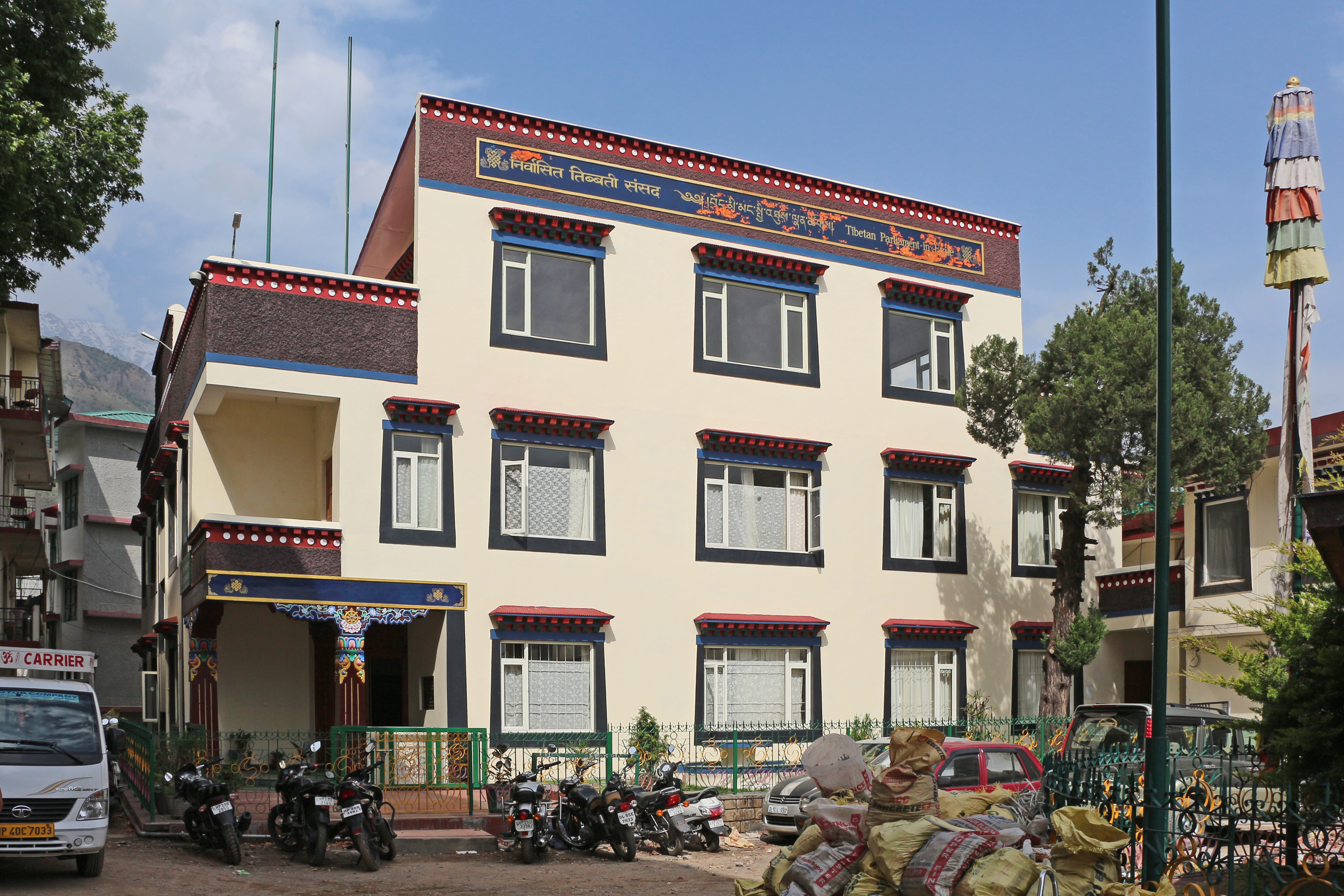
Building of the Parliament of the Central Tibetan Administration, Dharamsala

Since 1974, the Tibetan Youth Congress has been carrying out a persistent campaign, urging that the Deputies to the ATPD be elected by the combined electorate of all the three provinces. In 1981, the High-Level Standing Committee decided by a majority vote to hold the election to the 8th ATPD as petitioned by the Youth Congress and this was duly announced by the Election Commission. But the Do-toe public then protested that the existing system was adequate. As a result, the High-Level Standing Committee reviewed its decision and decided that a one-time voting would be held for the 8th ATPD and the Dalai Lama would then nominate the members from the primaries.

The Dalai Lama reduced the number of provincial Deputies to two each from three provinces and one eminent Tibetan besides the 5 Deputies from the religious traditions, which brought the total strength to 12. As entrusted, the Dalai Lama selected all the members of the ATPD from the list determined by the primary election voting.

In 1984, the Election Commission announced the election schedule for the 9th ATPD. Again, the Do-toe public demanded for the continuance of the previous system, therefore, on the advice of the Dalai Lama, a meeting was held under the auspices of the ATPD. The meeting was attended by representatives of the provinces, the Tibetan Youth Congress and new arrivals from Tibet. And it was decided that so long as a unanimous decision could not be reached, the Dalai Lama should appoint the ATPD members. Also it was decided on the meeting that the term of the ATPD be increased to five years, and on 8 July 1985 it was announced and extended the term of the 8th ATPD by two years to make it five.

=== Towards an elected head of government ===
The Dalai Lama nominated all the members of the 9th ATPD. That was an interim measure proposed during the National General Assembly and approved by the High Level Standing Committee that it should continue till common acceptable solution is found. The 9th ATPD lasted only for one year, as the election for the 10th ATPD was notified.

On 3 September 1988, during the Dalai Lama's first audience to the 10th ATPD, the Dalai Lama stressed that he shall not hold any state responsibility when a new government is set up in future Tibet. He also said that the members of the ATPD should be elected by the people rather than him. He further added that Tibetans should be educated about democracy and be able to shoulder more responsibilities of the government.

Again, on 6 May 1989, during the General Assembly, The Dalai Lama emphasized the need for more democratic reforms, including the election of a head of the government. He suggested setting up a constitution drafting committee for this purpose. The leaders and the people of Tibet felt that their inherent faith in the Dalai Lama was more democratic than any alternative arrangement that might be set up. On this basis, they pledged to undertake democratic reforms but pleaded the Dalai Lama not to withdraw from the leadership.

The Dalai Lama once again advised the Kashag to continue discussions on possible reforms. In August 1989, the Kashag convened a conference of 230 participants comprised by members of the ATPD, government officials, NGOs and representatives of new arrivals from Tibet. Following it, the Kashag circulated a five-point discussion paper and called for feedback on it from Tibetans both in exile and in Tibet. The five points were: 1) Whether to have a Prime Minister in the existing government set up. 2) Whether the Ministers should be elected or appointed as before by the Dalai Lama. 3) Whether a political party system should be introduced for government formation. 4) Whether any change should be made in the number of ATPD members and their responsibilities. 5) What other democratic changes could be made.

A total of 287 suggestions were received from Tibetans inside and outside of Tibet. Then, on 11 May 1990, a Special People's Congress was called, and on the basis of suggestion received, it was decided that the ministers shall continue to be appointed by the Dalai Lama; however, the elected ATPD members no longer required approval from The Dalai Lama. Also, on that day, the Kashag and the ATPD were declared dissolved. The Dalai Lama directed participants in the Special Congress to elect an interim Kashag, to hold office until the proclamation of a new charter.

=== Interregnum ===
The interregnum period was from 12 May 1990 to 28 May 1991. During this period, the Dalai Lama appointed a Constitution Review Committee with instructions to draft a democratic charter for the Tibetans in exile and also to review the existing draft constitution for future Tibet. The draft charter for the Tibetans in exile was to incorporate well defined provisions based on the realities of the situation in exile although the Dalai Lama agreed to be the head of the state and government owing to the prevailing circumstances. But he emphasized that when a truly democratic system is achieved in Tibetan society then the Dalai Lama would no longer hold any official responsibility or political designation.

The charter drafting committee consulted a number of Tibetan and non-Tibetan experts and scholars and came out with a documents which reflected the above directives.

The draft charter was based on: the draft constitution of 1963, the Five Point Peace Plan of 1987, the Dalai Lama's address to the European Parliament in 1988, and his addresses to the 10th ATPD in 1988, the 16th General Assembly in 1989, and the Special Congress in 1990.

In the years that followed, the community in exile showed extreme reluctance to accept the Dalai Lama's directives suggesting limits on his powers. However, in 1990, thirty years after initiating the democratic process, the Dalai Lama announced a dramatic change, empowering the parliament to conform the established norms of democracy.

The Dalai Lama address on 11 May 1990 to the Deputies attending the 10th session of the ATPD, and other eminent Tibetans, that he is renouncing the supreme authority vested in him to approve the members of the Assembly and to supervise its functioning. Further, the Dalai Lama went on to outline proposals for expanding the membership of the assembly, electing Kalons, who were not the members of the Assembly, for giving more representation to women, and on the advisability of setting up two Houses of the legislature. He spoke on the need for a judicial tribunal to look into the people's complaints and also on other requirements of a fully functioning democracy. The future administration was thus projected as a fully democratic government capable of shouldering greater responsibilities.

=== Expanded Assembly and new Charter ===
On 29 May 1991, the Dalai Lama addressed the 11th ATPD on the outcome of his epochal pronouncement of the previous year. The membership of the Assembly had risen from 12 to 46, which represented from all sections of the society. 10 members each from the three traditional provinces of Tibet, namely, U-Tsang, Do-toe and Do-mey; 2 each from the four Buddhist schools and Bon; 2 from Europe, 1 from North America, and 3 nominated by the Dalai Lama as being the head of the state.

When the Charter was adopted on 14 June 1991, it provided that a candidate needed to win at least 70% of the Assembly votes to be declared elected as Kalon. When the Assembly failed to elect the required seven Kalons, the Dalai Lama was urged to nominate a list of not less than double the number of Kalons to be elected. The impractical provision was amended in 1993, so that seven candidates securing the highest number of votes would be declared elected as Kalons.

A Supreme Justice Commission was set up as the apex tribunal for arbitrating civil cases within the Tibetan diaspora and for interpreting the Tibetan laws. Thus, the three pillars of democracy were firmly established, ensuring a fully functioning democratic polity, with a system check and balance and accountability system. An independent Audit Commission was set up to audit the accounts of all central and local offices. An independent Public Service Commission was set up to oversee the recruitment and maintain the records of all Tibetan public servants. To oversee the election of Kalons, members of the ATPD, Settlement Officers and Local Assembly, an independent Election Commission was set up.

The Assembly approves and sanctions the budget of the Government in exile presented by the Finance Minister. Though members could propose cuts or seek to raises on the recurring budget expenses, the planned budget for social welfare activities are generally approved without much discussion. However, the Kalons remain accountable for the utilization of the funds. The Assembly was empowered to impeach the Kashag, the Supreme Justice Commissioners, and the heads of the three independent bodies: Audit, Public Service and Election by two-thirds majority; and under special circumstances, even the Dalai Lama could be impeached by a three-fourths majority vote of the Assembly.

On 16 September 1998, the Dalai Lama proposed further reforms to the election of Kalons, citing dissatisfaction on his part in finding suitable candidates. He also said the existing process was inadequate and did not fulfill the norms of real democracy. He suggested that a Kalon Tripa be elected by the Assembly from a list of three nominees by him. The elected Kalon Tripa was then to nominate at least 14 candidates for the Assembly to vote on to elect his ministerial colleagues. The other option proposed was for the Kalons to be elected by an electorate consisting of the Assembly members, all civil servants above the rank of Deputy Secretary, members of the Local Assemblies, the Tibetan Freedom Movement Sub-Committee members and representatives of NGOs. The candidate with the maximum number of votes could be the Chief Kalon, or the elected Kalons could vote for Kalon Tripa among themselves.

These proposals were thoroughly discussed in the Assembly and seek suggestions from the public. On 3 October 2000, the Dalai Lama approved the amendment of the Charter regarding the election of the Kalong Tripa and the other Kalons. Under it, the Assembly would elect the Kalon Tripa from a list of not less than two members provided by the Dalai Lama and the Kalon Tripa would nominate his ministerial colleagues, subject to approval or rejection by the Assembly by a simple majority vote. The Kalon Tripa could appoint a maximum of seven Kalon.

However, sensing that the latest amendment may need to be further amended sooner or later, the Dalai Lama suggested that the Kalon Tripa be directly elected by the people. In his landmark address to the last session of the 12th ATPD, on 15 March 2001, he referred to the latest amendment and said that the process had brought the system closer to the essence of democracy. Accordingly, the Charter was amended to provide for direct election of the Kalon Tripa and for the Kalon Tripa to nominate candidates for the election of his ministerial colleagues. This was another significant milestone in the democratic reform of the Tibetan polity.

=== Direct election ===
The 13th ATPD formally began with the opening of its first session on 31 May 2001. The direct election of the Kalon Tripa, the Chief Executive of the Central Tibetan Administration, in 2001 was the most significant democratic development during its term. The Assembly approved far reaching policies of the Kashag on a negotiated solution to the Tibet issue, the new education policy, privatization of businesses, organic and natural farming policy in the settlements and better functioning of the Tibetan cooperatives, etc. The 12th Kashag brought in a new sense of accountability and transparency to the Assembly. The financial status of the Central Tibetan Administration was made public and the funds earmarked for social welfare were placed under complete control of the Assembly.

In September 2003, the Dalai Lama pushed further reforms to give up the last vestiges of his administrative power. He suggested that he no longer make direct nominations to the Assembly, or directly appoint the heads of the three independent institutions of Audit, Public Service and Election Commission, or nominate the Supreme Justice Commissioners. The commissions were placed under a common head in view of their limited workload under the current situation.

Regarding these, the Assembly amended the relevant articles of the Charter, leaving it open for the Dalai Lama to decide whether to nominate up to three eminent Tibetans to the Assembly. Selection committees were to be formed for the appointment of the Supreme Justice Commissioners and the heads of the three independent institutions.

The five-year term of the 13th ATPD ended on 30 May 2006 and the 14th was constituted on 31 May 2006 till 30 May 2011. The 14th Assembly began with having no direct nominee from the Dalai Lama, so therefore, its strength became 43. Also the Assembly formally changed its name from Assembly of Tibetan People's Deputies (ATPD) to Tibetan Parliament in Exile (TPiE), and the chairman's title to that of Speaker and Vice Chairman to Deputy Speaker.

The 14th TPiE began with a constitutional crisis owing to its inability to elect a Speaker. Despite repeated polling, Do-Mey provincial representative Mr. Penpa Tsering and U-Tsang representative Mr. Karma Choephel kept getting identical number of votes. The impasse was finally resolved with guidance from Chief Election Commissioner, despite the absence of such provision in the Charter, it was suggested to share the speakership between the two candidates for two and half years each.

The 14th TPiE took an important decision to allocate area/zonal responsibilities to the MPs for the purpose of ensuring the well-being of the Tibetan people residing in them. After touring their respective zones, they have to submit their reports to the TPiE's Standing Committee, which, after careful consideration, refer to the Kashag for action through the concerned Ministries and Departments.

The most historic event took place when on 10 March 2011, during the 52nd Anniversary of the Tibetan National Uprising Day, The Dalai Lama has announced about his retirement from the political position. He said, "During the forthcoming eleventh session of the fourteenth Tibetan Parliament in Exile, which begins on 14 March, I will formally propose that the necessary amendments be made to the Charter for Tibetans in Exile, reflecting my decision to devolve my formal authority to the elected leader."

"As early as the 1960s, I repeatedly stressed that Tibetans need a leader, elected freely by the Tibetan people, to whom I could devolve power. Now, we have clearly reached the time to put this into effect…. Since I made my intention clear I have received repeated and earnest requests both from within Tibet and outside, to continue to provide political leadership. My desire to devolve authority has nothing to do with a wish to shirk responsibility. It is to benefit Tibetans in the long run. It is not because I feel disheartened. Tibetans have placed such faith and trust in me that as one among them, so I am committed to playing my part in the just cause of Tibet. I trust that gradually people will come to understand my intention, will support my decision and accordingly let it take effect," said The Dalai Lama.

Following two days of debate in the Tibetan Parliament in Exile, the resolution was passed by a majority of 37 to 1, with five members being on leaves of absence. It asked the Dalai Lama to continue to be both the temporal and spiritual leader of the Tibetan people, saying his leadership was pre-eminently democratic and there was no better alternative to it. However, on 19 March 2011, the Dalai Lama had rejected a resolution passed by the exile Tibetan parliament and reiterated what he has stated in his letter to the parliament on 14 March 2011, to carry out the necessary constitutional and other sweeping amendments to effectuate it.

Also on 25 May 2011, the Dalai Lama rejected a unanimous request from all the 418 delegates to the second Tibetan National General Meeting, held at Dharamsala from 21 to 24 May, that he remain a ceremonial head of the exile Tibetan administration. He did, however, agree to being enshrined as the protector and symbol of the Tibetan nation in a new Preamble and Article 1 of the Charter of Tibetans in Exile.

The Dalai Lama wanted full democratization to be carried out while he was still available to help resolve any problems that may arise along the way, that the decision was a culmination of a reform process he had initiated back in Tibet before 1959, and he said many times that there is no room for kings and religious rulers in today's age of progress toward full democracy. Thus, without any option, the Tibetan Parliament in Exile reluctantly agreed to make necessary changes in the Charter.

On 27 April 2011, the Chief Election Commissioner of the Central Tibetan Administration, Mr. Jamphel Choesang announces new members of the 15th TPiE and Dr. Lobsang Sangay as the Chief of the Cabinet (Kalon Tripa) of CTA in an election held on 20 March 2011, in exile Tibetan community all over the world. The term of the 15th TPiE is from the year 2011 to 2016.

It consists of anywhere between 43 and 47 members, including:

- two delegates from the Tibetan diaspora in Europe
- two delegates from the Tibetan diaspora in North America (an amendment in September 2010 raised the number to two from one)
- ten delegates from each one of the three traditional provinces of Tibet
- two members each from the four schools of Tibetan Buddhism and the traditional Bon school

Election to the parliament is open to all Tibetans who are at least 25 years old, and the minimum voting age is 18. There are no political parties in the elections. Sessions are held twice every year between six month intervals. A standing committee of 12 members is in place when the Parliament is not in session, consisting of two members from each traditional region, one member from each religious denomination, and one member who is directly nominated by the Dalai Lama.

The parliament also helps with organization of local parliaments established in 38 major Tibetan communities.

On April 26, 2026, Tibetans in 27 countries voted for their parliament-in-exile, the India-based Central Tibetan Administration. China condemned the election, calling the CTA a separatist group, amid its broader control over Tibetan affairs. The five-year parliament of 45 members represents provinces, religious traditions, and the diaspora, continuing the Dalai Lama's “Middle Way” policy seeking autonomy rather than full independence.

== Members of the 17th TPiE ==
Members	Constituency or tradition
1. Ven. Khenpo Sonam Tenphel; 2. Ven. Khenpo Jamphal Tenzin	Nyingma tradition
1. Ven. Mr. Kunga Sotop; 2. Ven. Tenpa Yarphel	Kagyu tradition
1. Ven. Lopon Thupten Gyaltsen; 2. Ven. Khenpo Kada Ngedup Sonam	Sakya tradition
1. Ven. Geshe Lharampa Gowo Lobsang Phende; 2. Ven. Geshe Lharampa Atuk Tseten	Gelug tradition
1. Ven. Geshe Atong Rinchen Gyaltsen; 2. Ven. Geshe Monlam Tharchin	Bön tradition
1. Ms. Dolma Tsering Teykhang; 2. Mr. Dawa Phunkyi; 3. Mr. Migyur Dorjee; 4. Mr. Ngodup Dorjee; 5. Mr. Lobsang Gyatso Sithar; 6. Ms. Tsering Yangchen; 7. Mr. Rigzin Lhundup; 8. Ms. Lhagyari Namgyal Dolkar; 9. Mr. Dawa Tsering; 10. Ms. Tenzin Choezin	Ü-Tsang
1. Mr. Dorjee Tseten; 2. Mrs. Youdon Aukatsang; 3. Ms. Juchen Konchok Chodon; 4. Mr. Tenzin Jigdal; 5. Mr. Serta Tsultrim; 6. Mr. Choephel Thupten; 7. Ms. Tsering Dolma; 8. Mr. Phurpa Dorjee Gyaldhong; 9. Mr. Kunchok Yangphel; 10. Mr. Wangdue Dorjee	Do-Toe
1. Ms. Pema Tso; 2. Mr. Dhondup Tashi; 3. Ms. Tsering Lhamo; 4. Mr. Serta Tashi Dhundup; 5. Mr. Ratsa Sonam Norbu; 6. Mr. Karma Gelek; 7. Ms. Yeshi Dolma; 8. Mr. Lobsang Thupten; 9. Ven. Geshe Ngaba Gangri; 10. Mr. Choedak Gyatso	Do-Mey
1. Ven. Thubten Wangchen; 2. Mr. Thupten Gyatso	Europe
1. Mr. Tenzing Jigme; 2. Mr. Thondup Tsering	North America
Mr. Doring Tenzin Phuntsok	Australasia and Asia (Excluding India, Nepal and Bhutan)
