= Central Tibetan Administration =

Tibetan government-in-exile based in India

Central Tibetan Administration བོད་མིའི་སྒྲིག་འཛུགས་
- Flag Emblem
- Motto: བོད་གཞུང་དགའ་ལྡན་ཕོ་བྲང་ཕྱོགས་ལས་རྣམ་རྒྱལ "Tibetan Government, Ganden Palace, Victorious in all Directions"
- Anthem: བོད་རྒྱལ་ཁབ་ཆེན་པོའི་རྒྱལ་གླུ "Tibetan National Anthem"
- Status: Government-in-exile
- Capital-in-exile: Dharamshala
- Headquarters: McLeod Ganj 176215, Dharamshala, Himachal Pradesh, India
- Official languages: Tibetan
- Religion: Tibetan Buddhism
- Government: Presidential republic
  - Sikyong: Penpa Tsering
  - Speaker: Khenpo Sonam Tenphel
- Legislature: Parliament of the Central Tibetan Administration
- Establishment: 29 May 2011
  - 17 Point Agreement repudiated: March 1959
  - Re-establishment of the Kashag in exile: 29 April 1959
  - Charter of the Tibetans In-Exile: 14 June 1991
- Time zone: UTC+5:30 (IST)
- Website tibet.net

The Central Tibetan Administration (Tibetan: བོདབུས་བོད་མིའི་སྒྲིག་འཛུགས།་, Wylie: Bod mi'i sgrig 'dzugs, THL: Bömi Drikdzuk, IPA: [pʰỳ.mìː ʈìʔ.tsùʔ], lit. 'Tibetan People's Exile Organization') is the government-in-exile of Tibet, based in Dharamshala, India. It comprises a judiciary branch, a legislative branch, and an executive branch, and offers support and services to the Tibetan exile community.

The 14th Dalai Lama formally rescinded the 1951 17 Point Agreement with China in early March 1959, as he was escaping Tibet for India. On 29 April 1959, the 14th Dalai Lama in exile re-established the Kashag, which was abolished a month earlier by the government of the People's Republic of China on 28 March 1959. He later became permanent head of the Tibetan Administration and the executive functions for Tibetans-in-exile. On 11 February 1991, Tibet became a founding member of the Unrepresented Nations and Peoples Organization (UNPO) at a ceremony held at the Peace Palace in The Hague, Netherlands. After the Dalai Lama decided no longer to assume administrative authority, the Charter of Tibetans in Exile was updated in May 2011 to repeal all articles relating to his political duties.

The Tibetan diaspora and refugees support the Central Tibetan Administration by voting for members of its parliament, the Sikyong, and by making annual financial contributions through the use of the Green Book. The Central Tibetan Administration also receives international support from other organizations and individuals. The Central Tibetan Administration authors reports, press releases, and administers a network of schools and other cultural activities for Tibetans in India.

== Position on the status of Tibet ==
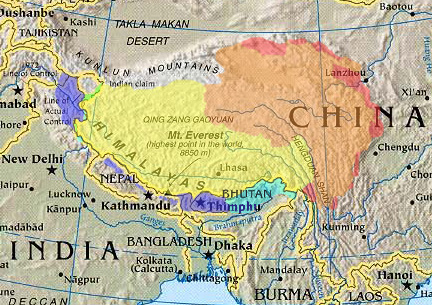
Greater Tibet as claimed by Tibetan exile groups

In 1963, the 14th Dalai Lama promulgated the Constitution of Tibet, and he became permanent head of state of Tibet. In 1974, the 14th Dalai Lama rejected calls for Tibetan independence, and he became permanent head of the Tibetan Administration and the executive functions for Tibetans-in-exile in 1991. In 2005, the 14th Dalai Lama emphasized that Tibet is a part of China, and Tibetan culture and Buddhism are part of Chinese culture. In March 2011, at 71 years of age, he decided to relinquish any political and administrative authority. The Charter of Tibetans in Exile was updated immediately in May 2011, and all articles related to regents were also repealed. In 2017, the 14th Dalai Lama restated that Tibet does not seek independence from China but seeks development.

== Funding ==
The funding of the Central Tibetan Administration comes mostly from private donations collected with the help of organizations like the Tibet Fund, revenue from the Green Book (the "Tibetan in exile passport") and aid from governments like India and the US.

The annual revenue of the Central Tibetan Administration is officially 22 million (measured in US dollars), with the biggest shares going to political activity ($7 million), and administration ($4.5 million). However, according to Michael Backman, these sums are "remarkably low" for what the organization claims to do, and it probably receives millions more in donations. The CTA does not acknowledge such donations or their sources.

According to a Chinese source, between 1964 and 1968, the U.S. provided 1.735 million dollars to the Dalai Lama's group each year. In October 1998, The Dalai Lama's administration stated that it had received US$1.7 million a year during the 1960s from the Central Intelligence Agency.

In 2002, the Tibetan Policy Act of 2002 was passed in the U.S. In 2016, the United States Agency for International Development (USAID) awarded a grant of US$23 million to CTA.

In 2017, U.S. president Donald Trump proposed to stop aid to the CTA in 2018. Trump's proposal was criticized heavily by members of the Democratic Party like Nancy Pelosi, and co-chair of the bipartisan Tom Lantos Human Rights Commission, Jim McGovern. In February 2020, at the annual National Prayer Breakfast, Pelosi prayed as Trump attended; "Let us pray for the Panchen Lama and all the Tibetan Buddhists in prison in China or missing for following their faith". In 2025, the Trump administration halted funds to the CTA, which amounted to half of CTA's budget at the time. However, funding has since been restored as of July of the same year.

== Headquarters ==
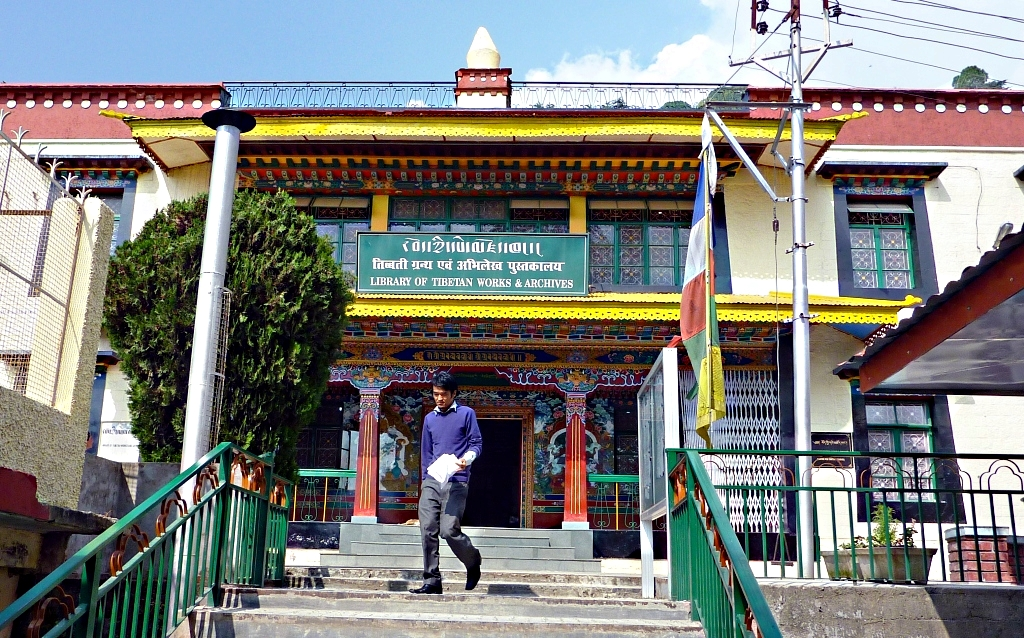
Library of Tibetan Works and Archives in 2010

The Central Tibetan Administration is headquartered in McLeod Ganj, Dharamshala, India.

The CTA attends to the welfare of the Tibetan exile community in India, who number around 100,000. It runs schools, health services, cultural activities and economic development projects for the Tibetan community. As of 2003, more than 1,000 refugees still arrive each year from China, usually via Nepal.

=== Green Book ===
Tibetans living outside Tibet can apply at a Central Tibetan Administration office in their country of residence for a personal document called the Green Book, which serves as a receipt book for the person's "voluntary contributions" to the CTA and the evidence of their claims for "Tibetan citizenship".

For this purpose, CTA defines a Tibetan as "any person born in Tibet, or any person with one parent who was born in Tibet." As Tibetan refugees often lack documents attesting to their place of birth, the eligibility is usually established by an interview.

=== Blue Book ===
The Blue Book or Tibetan Solidarity Partnership is a project by Central Tibetan Administration, in which the CTA issues any supporter of Tibet who is of age 18 years or more a Blue Book. This initiative enables supporters of Tibet worldwide to make financial contributions to help the administration in supporting educational, cultural, developmental and humanitarian activities related to Tibetan children and refugees. The book is issued at various CTA offices worldwide.

== Internal structure ==
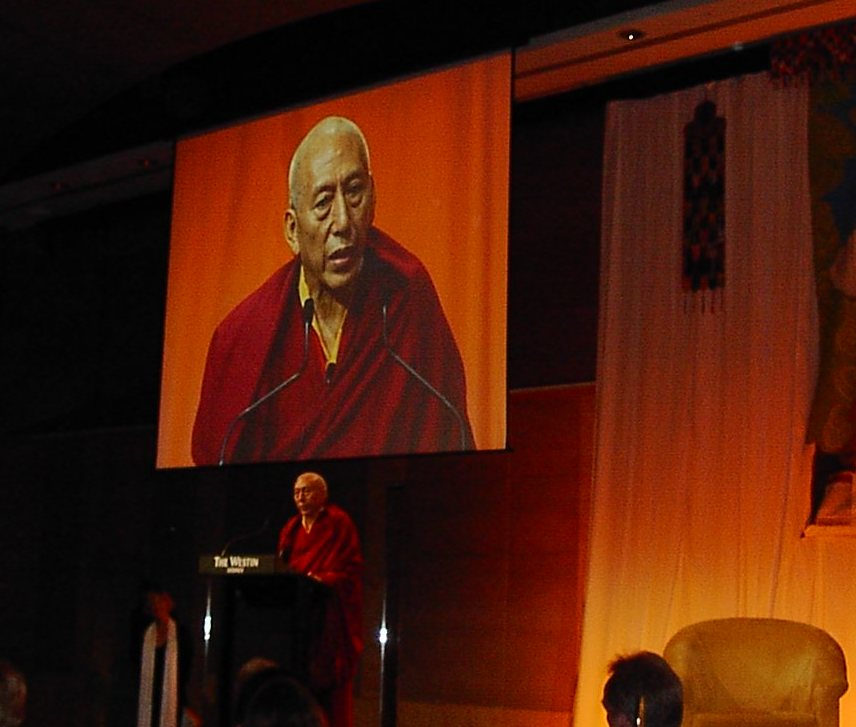
The former chairman of the Cabinet of the CTA, Samdhong Rinpoche, addresses a fundraising dinner in Sydney, Australia, February 2006

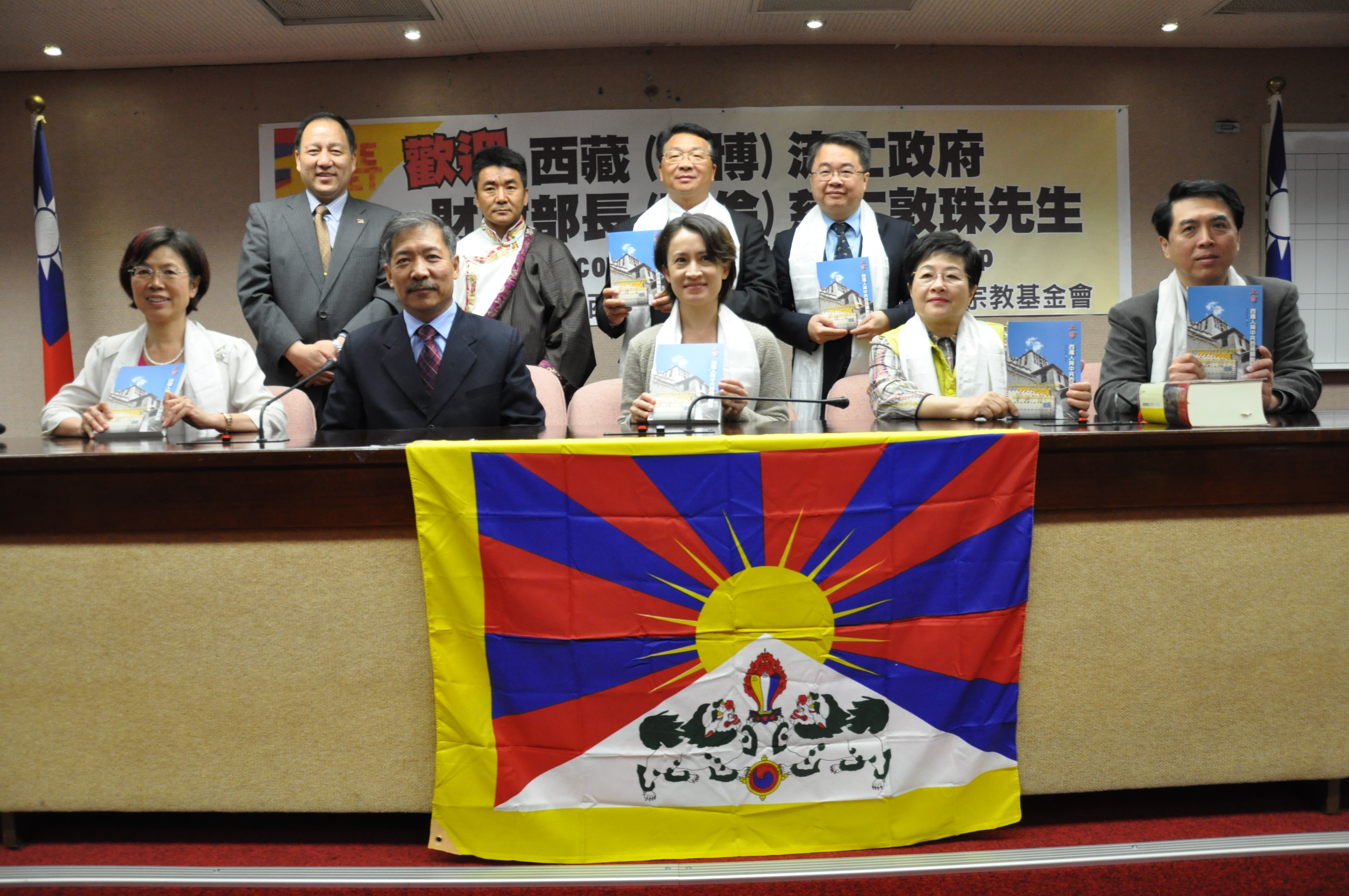
Finance Kalon Tsering Dhondup (front row, second from left) visited the Republic of China in Taiwan's Legislative Yuan in 2013

The Central Tibetan Administration currently operates under the "Charter of the Tibetans In-Exile", adopted in 1991, amended in 2011. Executive authority is vested in the Sikyong, an office formerly held by Lobsang Sangay, who was elected in 2011. The Sikyong is supported by a cabinet of Kalons responsible for specific portfolios. Legislative authority is vested in the Parliament of the Central Tibetan Administration.

The Central Tibetan Administration's Department of Finance is made of seven departments and several special offices. Until 2003, it operated 24 businesses, including publishing, hotels, and handicrafts distribution companies.

On 29 April 1959, the Dalai Lama re-established the Kashag. In 1963, he promulgated Constitution of Tibet, and he became permanent head of state of Tibet. In 1974, he rejected calls for Tibetan independence, and he became permanent head of the Tibetan Administration and the executive functions for Tibetans-in-exile in 1991. On 10 March 2011, at 71 years of age, he decided not to assume any political and administrative authority, the Charter of Tibetans in Exile was updated immediately in May 2011, and all articles related to regents were also repealed, and position Sikyong was created.

=== Kashag ===
Notable past members of the Cabinet include Gyalo Thondup, the Dalai Lama's eldest brother, who served as Chairman of the Cabinet and as Kalon of Security, and Jetsun Pema, the Dalai Lama's younger sister, who served variously as Kalon of Health and of Education. Lobsang Nyandak Zayul who served as a representative of the 14th Dalai Lama in the Americas and a multiple cabinet member. He currently serves as president of The Tibet Fund.

- Penpa Tsering – Sikyong
- Ven Karma Gelek Yuthok – Kalon of Religion & Culture
- Sonam Topgyal Khorlatsang – Kalon of Home
- Karma Yeshi – Kalon of Finance
- Pema Yangchen – Kalon of Education
- Phagpa Tsering Labrang – Kalon of Security
- Lobsang Sangay – Kalon of Information & International Relations
- Choekyong Wangchuk – Kalon of Health

== Settlements ==
The Central Tibetan Administration, together with the Indian government, has constructed more than 45 "settlements" in India for Tibetan refugees as of 2020. The establishment of the Tibetan Re-settlement and Rehabilitation (TRR) settlements began in 1966, with the TRR settlements in South India, Darjeeling, and Sikkim becoming officially "protected areas" and requiring special entry permits for entry.

== Media activities ==
A 1978 study by Melvyn Goldstein and a 1983 study by Lynn Pulman on Tibetan communities-in-exile in southern India argue that the CTA adopted a stance of preserving an "idea of return" and fostering the development of an intense feeling of Tibetan cultural and political nationalism among Tibetans" in order to remain a necessary part of the communities. They state that this was accomplished through the creation of the Tibetan Uprising Day holiday, a Tibetan National Anthem, and the CTA control over local Tibetan-language media that promotes the idea of Chinese endeavours to "eradicate the Tibetan race". From the 1990s onwards, the CTA used Hollywood films in addition to local media to emphasise the Tibetan exile struggle, secure the loyalty of Tibetans both in exile and in Tibet, promote Tibetan nationalism, and foster the CTA's legitimacy to act in the name of the entire Tibetan nation.

== Foreign relations ==
The Central Tibetan Authority is not recognised as a sovereign government by any country, but it receives financial aid from governments and international organisations for its welfare work among the Tibetan exile community in India.

=== United States ===
In 1991, United States President George H. W. Bush signed a Congressional Act that explicitly called Tibet "an occupied country", and identified the Dalai Lama and his administration as "Tibet's true representatives".

In October 1998 the Dalai Lama's administration issued a statement acknowledging the Dalai Lama Group received US$1.7 million a year during the 1960s from the U.S. government through the Central Intelligence Agency, used to train volunteers, run guerrilla operations against the Chinese, and used to open offices and for international lobbying. A guerrilla force was reportedly trained at Camp Hale in Colorado.

During his administration, United States President Barack Obama supported Middle Way Policy of the Central Tibetan Administration and met with the Dalai Lama four times, including at the 2015 annual National Prayer Breakfast.

In 2021, the Biden Administration pledged its support for the CTA, to which a representative expressed gratitude.

== See also ==
- 2021 Central Tibetan Administration general election
- Mongolian and Tibetan Affairs Commission – defunct body in the Republic of China.
- Mainland Affairs Council
- Ganden Phodrang
- Inner Mongolian People's Party
- Chushi Gangdruk
- Parliament of the Central Tibetan Administration
- Simla Treaty
- East Turkistan Government in Exile
