= Rinchen Khandro Choegyal =

Tibetan politician

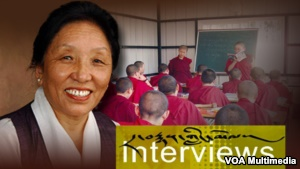
- Rinchen Khandro in 2013

Personal details
- Born: Rinchen Khandro; March 22, 1946 (age 79) Kardze, Kham, eastern Tibet
- Occupation: Minister

Rinchen Khandro Choegyal (born on March 22, 1946) is a Tibetan politician who served as minister of the interior and education in the Tibetan government-in-exile.

== Biography ==
Rinchen Khandro was born on March 22, 1946, in Kardze into a merchant family in Kham, eastern Tibet. She moved with her family to Lhasa, where she attended school. In 1958, she and her family moved to Kalimpong, India, to attend a boarding school. Following the 1959 Tibetan uprising, the family decided to remain in India. In 1967, she joined Loreto Convent in Darjeeling, where she earned a Bachelor of Arts degree. There she met Ngari Rinpoche, the younger brother of Tenzin Gyatso, the 14th Dalai Lama. Rinchen Khandro and Ngari Rinpoche worked at the Tibetan Youth Congress at the time of its fondation. In 1972, they married and became teachers at Tibetan Children's Villages. Then, Rinchen Khandro, with her two newborn children, a son and a daughter, followed her husband when he joined the Special Frontier Force, created by the Indian government to have Tibetans in exile monitor the Chinese border. In 1974, they moved to Kashmir Cottage at the request of the Dalai Lama's mother. After her death in 1982, they converted it into a guesthouse.

Between 1993 and 1996, she served as minister of the interior and minister of education for the Tibetan government-in-exile, holding the latter position from 1996 to 2001.

Rinchen Khandro is the founder of the Tibetan Women's Association in Exile and its first president. She is the administrator of the Dolma Ling Nunnery, located near the Norbulingka Institute in Dharamsala. She also coordinates the Tibetan Nuns Project.
