= Thubten Samphel =

Tibetan writer and government official (1956–2022)

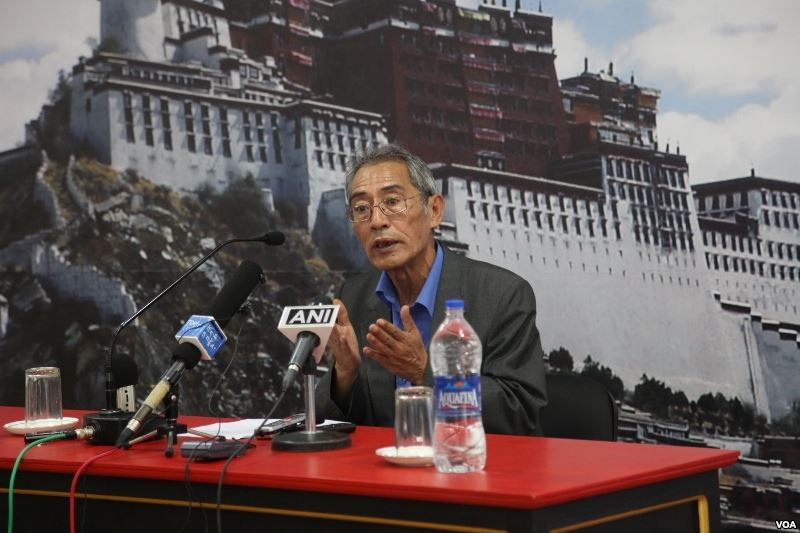
- Samphel in 2013
- Born: 2 November 1956; Lhasa, Tibet Area, China
- Died: 4 June 2022 (aged 65); Bylakuppe, India
- Education: Delhi University; Columbia University
- Occupations: Writer; Government official

Thubten Samphel (Standard Tibetan: ཐུབ་བསྟན་བསམ་འཕེལ; 2 November 1956 – 4 June 2022) was a Tibetan writer, journalist, and government official. He worked as a secretary in the Ministry of Foreign Affairs and was a spokesperson of the Central Tibetan Administration, based in Dharamshala. He also worked for the administration's think tank, Tibet Policy Institute.

== Biography ==
=== Family ===
Born in Lhasa in 1956, Samphel was the son of parents who worked as servants to the mother of the 14th Dalai Lama, Diki Tsering.

=== Exile in India ===
Three years after the 1959 Tibetan uprising, Samphel left Tibet with his older brother. They arrived in Tingri before crossing the Chinese-Nepalese border into the Solukhumbu District.

=== Studies ===
Tsering Dolma, older sister of the 14th Dalai Lama, sent Samphel to school at the Tibetan Children's Villages before he joined Dr. Graham's Homes, a missionary school in Kalimpong. After his secondary studies, he attended St. Stephen's College, Delhi and Delhi University, where he earned a bachelor's and a master's degree in history. While studying for his master's, he was employed in the office of Tenzin Geyche Tethong, a secretary in the private office of the Dalai Lama.

=== Administrative career ===
In 1980, Samphel became an official within the Tibetan government-in-exile. He was among the first group of Tibetan Fulbright Scholars to study in the United States, where he earned a degree in journalism from Columbia University. In 1985, he was sent to Amdo by the Dalai Lama as part of the Fact-finding missions to Tibet. From 1999 to 2012, he was secretary of the Ministry of Foreign Affairs and a spokesperson of the Central Tibetan Administration. In 2012, he became director of the Tibet Policy Institute. In November 2018, he retired from the Central Tibetan Administration.

=== Writer ===
Samphel wrote articles for numerous Tibetan, Indian, and foreign newspapers. He authored the novel Falling through the roof.

=== Death ===
Thubten Samphel died in Bylakuppe on 4 June 2022.

== Publications ==
- Les dalaï-lamas du Tibet (2001)
- Falling through the Roof (2008)
- Tibet : from Tranquillity to Turmoil (2008)
- Tibet: Reports from Exile (2019)
- Copper Mountain (2022)
