= Tenzin Geyche Tethong =

- བསྟན་འཛིན་དགེ་བྱེད་བཀྲས་མཐོང
- Tenzin Gyeche Tethong in 1970

Personal details
- Born: May 22, 1943 (age 83) Tibet

Tenzin Geyche Tethong (Tibetan: བསྟན་འཛིན་དགེ་བྱེད་བཀྲས་མཐོང, Wylie: bstan 'dzin dge byed bkras mthong; born May 22, 1943) is one of the four founders and first president of the Tibetan Youth Congress (TYC). He served as the secretary of the 14th Dalai Lama's private office until retiring in 2007.

== Biography ==
He was born in Tibet near Lhasa, into a noble family, many of whose members were officials in the Tibetan government, like his grandfather, Gyurme Gyatso Tethong, who was a minister. With his father, mother and three brothers, he went into exile in India, in Kalimpong, at the beginning of the Chinese invasion in the early 1950s.

He received his primary and secondary education in Christian schools, first in Kalimpong, then at a convent, and finally at St. Augustine's School until 1955.

In 1956, he met the 14th Dalai Lama during his first visit to India and felt a karmic connection.

From 1956 to 1963, he continued his secondary education at various schools, including Mount Hermon School in Darjeeling. In 1959, with the Tibetan exodus, income from the family property in occupied Tibet was frozen.

His family's financial situation deteriorated, and he was forced to take on translation work. A British woman, Mrs. Buxton, provided him with a scholarship, allowing him to complete his studies, which he resumed three years late. In the early 1960s, his father, Sonam Tomjor Tethong, became headmaster of the Tibetan school in Simla.

At the school in Darjeeling, he met Ngari Rinpoche, who had arrived in India in 1959, and with whom he formed a friendship that has lasted for over 40 years. In the 1960s, he took monastic vows in Dharamsala and remained a monk for 15 years. In 1964, he became secretary to the Dalai Lama. He met Diki Tsering, the mother of Ngari Rinpoche and the Dalai Lama, with whom he got along very well.

In the 1960s, political awareness was growing in Dharamsala, responding to a need among young Tibetans to take a stand for the liberation of Tibet. With his brother Tenzin Namgyal Tethong, Kasur Sonam Topgyal, Lodi Gyari Rinpoche, and the limited resources of a mimeograph machine, he launched Sheja, a newspaper that quickly became very popular in October 1968 in McLeod Ganj.

Driven by this momentum, along with three other Tibetans in exile, the founders of Sheja, he co-founded the Tibetan Youth Congress (TYC) in 1970, becoming its founding president. Nearly 30 years later, the TYC plays a major role in Tibetan politics in exile, mobilizing youth and advocating for Tibetan independence as an opposition political party vis-à-vis the Central Tibetan Administration, according to Tsewang Phuntsok, president of the TYC from 1991 to 1995.

In 1974, Ngari Rinpoche succeeded Tenzin Geyche Tethong as president of the TYC.

After 1980, he left his monastic vows and married Kelsang Chukie Tethong, while retaining his position as secretary.

He served as a minister in the Central Tibetan Administration.

Neville Abbott Jacobs describes Tenzin Geyche Tethong as speaking the most fluent British English of anyone she had ever met.

He appeared in the film 10 Questions for the Dalai Lama by Rick Ray.

He is the author of a biography of the Dalai Lama, published in English in 2020.

== Publications ==
- His Holiness the Fourteenth Dalai Lama: An Illustrated Biography (with Tendzin Choegyal, Gautam Pemmaraju, and Jane Moore, 2021)
