= Tashi Wangchuk =

Tibetan filmmaker

Tashi Wangchuk is a Tibetan filmmaker who works for Voice of America, Tibetan Service as a TV Producer and host. Tashi in collaboration with his cousin/friend filmmaker, Tsultrim Dorjee established Seykhar Films (Formally Tibet Motion Pictures & Arts) in 2005 in Dehradun, India. Seykhar Films is now based in the San Francisco Bay Area, USA. Tashi studied filmmaking (MFA) under a Fulbright Scholarship from SUNY Buffalo. He also has a master's in economics from Dehradun, India. Earlier Tashi Wangchuk served at the prestigious Tibetan Institute of Performing Arts (TIPA) as a Public Relation Officer/Teacher from 2000 to 2002. It was primarily during this period that he is inspired by the arts and film-making.

== Films ==
Tashi and Tsultrim together produced and directed two Tibetan feature films: Richard Gere is My Hero (2007) and Phun Anu Thanu (2006), both of which are very popular among the Tibetan audience around the world. They also made three documentary films: Miss Tibet in Exile (2006), Democracy in Exile (2007) and lately Scent of Juniper (2014) which is Tashi's sole directorial and production venture. The film also received Rising Star Awards at 2014 Canada International Film Festival. Their film, Democracy in Exile was commissioned by India's Public Television Channel, Doordarshan. It has been telecast on DD1, India's foremost TV channel, several times. Earlier Tashi also made a short film titled: The Gentleman of San Francisco (2011) which is liked and appreciated by many viewers. Most of his films are now available online. In 2007, Tashi Wangchuk and Tsultrim Dorjee are conferred honorary award by Gyari Dolma, the then Deputy Speaker of Tibetan Parliament in Exile for their role in promoting filmmaking and awareness about Tibetan issues around the world.

== Theatre and Arts ==
Tashi is also passionate about theatre. During his stay at Tibetan Institute of Performing Arts(TIPA), he wrote, acted, and directed several plays and skits for the institute's youth wing (RTYC). Among the many plays, 'Gurukool College Canteen' and 'The Bollywood Shooting' are two of the notable plays he had directed. The Bollywood Shooting was performed during the 2002 Kalachakra at Bodhgaya, India. Tashi also used to write and direct plays for the Regional Tibetan Youth Congress, Dekyling and Rajpur Chapter.
