= Tsering Wangmo Satho =

Tibetan dancer and opera singer

- Born: 1967 (age 58–59); India
- Education: Tibetan Institute of Performing Arts
- Occupations: Dancer; opera singer; community leader
- Awards: National Heritage Fellowship (2022)

Tsering Wangmo Satho (born 1967) is a Tibetan dancer and opera singer based in the United States. She is a co-founder and artistic director Chaksam-pa, a Tibetan dance and opera troupe.

== Biography ==
Tsering Wangmo Satho was born in 1967 in a Tibetan refugee camp in India. She was inspired by seeing other elder Tibetan singers and dancers, including her mother Bhalu Satho, a folk singer from the southeastern Kongpo region. she studied at the Tibetan Institute of Performing Arts. She performed at the 1989 Texas Folklife Festival, her first appearance in the United States, and later successfully applied for a O-1B visa to remain in the country.

Wangmo Satho moved to the San Francisco Bay Area, where in 1989, she and other artists associated with the TIPA co-founded Chaksam-pa, a Tibetan dance and opera troupe, later becoming the organization's artistic director. In 2006, she released a CD, Forbidden Voice. In 2011, Chaksam-pa's production of The Religious King Norsang at the Craneway Pavilion in Richmond, California was the first full North American lhamo performance with master artists. She also started the Tibetan Cultural Preservation Project in 1995, and in 2020, Chaksam-pa released Songs of Kongpo, her project on collecting hundreds of Kongpo folk songs from her mother's memories.

In June 2022, Wangmo Satho was announced as one of the year's ten National Heritage Fellows. The National Endowment for the Arts noted that her "impact as a Tibetan traditional artist is felt across the diaspora and illuminates the beauty and power of Tibetan arts and culture on an international scale".

Wangmo Satho is also a leader in the Tibetan-American community in the Bay Area. She ran a Tibetan restaurant in San Francisco named Lhasa Moon and collaborated on a 1998 cookbook named The Lhasa Moon Tibetan Cookbook. She also teaches Tibetan language education, having done so in the Bay Area since 1989. She was previously the vice-president of the Tibetan Association of Northern California.

She performed on the film score Fate of the Lhapa (2007) by composer William Susman.

Wangmo Satho is based in Richmond, California.
