= Ngari Rinpoche =

Tibetan tulku, younger brother of the 14th Dalai Lama (1946–2026)

- མངའ་རིས་རིན་པོ་ཆེ
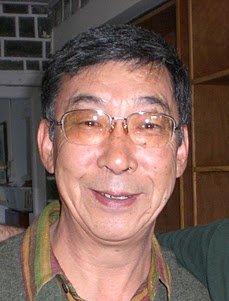
- Rinpoche in 2008

Tulku
- In office 1950 – 17 February 2026

Personal details
- Born: Tenzin Choegyal; March 1946 Lhasa, Tibet
- Died: 17 February 2026 (aged 79) Dharamshala, Himachal Pradesh, India
- Education: Drepung Monastery
- Occupation: Tulku

Tenzin Choegyal (Standard Tibetan: བསྟན་འཛིན་ཆོས་རྒྱལ; March 1946 – 17 February 2026) was a Tibetan tulku and politician.

The younger brother of the 14th Dalai Lama, he was known as Ngari Rinpoche (Standard Tibetan: མངའ་རིས་རིན་པོ་ཆེ).

== Life and career ==
Born in Lhasa in March 1946, Ngari Rinpoche had an older brother who died at the age of two due to smallpox; he was considered to be the child's reincarnation. Three days after his birth, his parents held a celebration, which attracted the likes of Heinrich Harrer. He was recognized as the 16th Ngari Rinpoche and entered the Drepung Monastery at the age of seven. He accompanied his brother and other family members on a trip to China in 1954, where he learned Mandarin. In 1956, he travelled to India to participate in ceremonies for the 2500th anniversary of the Buddha's death.

On 10 March 1959, amidst the Tibetan uprising, he was driven in a Soviet car from Drepung Monastery to the military camp where a performance was to be given in honor of the Dalai Lama. The Dalai Lama canceled his attendance due to the unusual demands to attend without his ministers or bodyguards. Tendzin Choegyal observed that all the Chinese and pro-Chinese Tibetans were armed and described General Tan Guansan as furious at the Dalai Lama's absence. Rinpoche's mother sent a servant to fetch her son after the performance, asking him to join her under the pretext that she was unwell. They both joined the Dalai Lama at Norbulingka the following day. He and the Dalai Lama, as brothers, fled from Tibet to India. Rinpoche studied at St. Joseph's School in Darjeeling, India, and then in the United States. Without renouncing Tibetan Buddhism, he became an adherent of Hinayana and frequented the same school as Tenzin Geyche Tethong. After his return to India, he met Rinchen Khandro Choegyal at Loreto Convent, where she had entered in 1967.

In 1971, Ngari Rinpoche joined the Central Tibetan Administration, the Tibetan government-in-exile, where he remained until 1986. He worked at the Tibetan Youth Congress alongside Richen Khandro Choegyal, who he eventually married in 1972 and with whom he became a teacher at the Tibetan Children's Villages. He also served in the Special Frontier Force for two years, monitoring the Chinese border for the Indian government. In 1974, he moved to the Kashmir Cottage at the request of his mother, Diki Tsering; he converted the cottage into a guesthouse after her death in 1982. In 1991, he was elected to the Parliament of the Central Tibetan Administration, representing Amdo. He served as a spiritual leader of the Karsha Monastery, the most important in Zanskar. He was also a spiritual leader of several monasteries in Ngari. He was a member of the Mind & Life Institute, where he served as an honorary member until his death.

Rinpoche died in Dharamshala on 17 February 2026, at the age of 79. (Note: Many sources mislabel his age as "80".) Apart from his brother, the Dalai Lama, and his sister, Jetsun Pema, he is survived by his wife Rinchen Khando Choegyal, their daughter Tenzin Choezom and son Tenzin Lodoe (also known as Tenzin L. Choegyal). On February 25, the Dalai Lama gave his advice to representatives of eight monasteries under the spiritual authority of Ngari Rinpoche in the search for his reincarnation, a prospect he had openly discussed.

== Publications ==
- His Holiness the Fourteenth Dalai Lama: An Illustrated Biography (with Tenzin Geyche Tethong, Gautam Pemmaraju, and Jane Moore, 2021)
