= Neville Abbott Jacobs =

American advocate for Tibetan culture

- The 1980s, when she was in her late fifties
- Born: Neville Lee Abbott; May 27, 1930; San Francisco, California, U.S.A
- Died: December 2, 2024 (aged 94); Fairbanks, Alaska, U.S.A.
- Education: University of Alaska Fairbanks (1964: BA in anthropology; 1968: MAs in anthropology and journalism)
- Occupations: journalist, photographer, art painter
- Known for: an American advocate for Tibetan culture and philosophy, especially Tibetan Buddhism
- Notable work: One of the promoters of the 14th Dalai Lama's first visit to the United States amidst political friction between the U.S. and China
- Spouses: Harry Waterfield (m. 1954; div. 1963); Robert Jacobs (m. 1968; died 2015)
- Children: None

Neville Abbott Jacobs (birth name: Neville Lee Abbott, 1930–2024) was an American advocate for Tibetan culture and philosophy, especially Tibetan Buddhism. also a lifelong student of the mind like her father, Charles Abbott. She was journalist, photographer, and art painter by profession. She died in Fairbanks, Alaska, on December 2, 2024, at the age of 94.

With the plaque she painted in the background, Neville Abbott Jacobs stands at the boarding entrance of the S.S. Nenana, located in Pioneer Park, Fairbanks, Alaska, U.S.A., in 1989

== Early life and education ==
Neville Abbott Jacobs was born on May 27, 1930, in San Francisco, California, as an only child to Charles Abbott and Enez Stough Abbott. The family moved to Southern California (Burbank and then Sherman Oaks) before finally settling in Anchorage, Alaska, in 1949. Her father engaged in a large contracting firm in California and served as a highway engineer in Alaska.

After graduating from Van Nuys Senior High School, Jacobs attended photography classes and enrolled in a chiropractic college in California, but she moved to Anchorage with her parents before completion in 1949. She ultimately decided to pursue a university education by first enrolling in Anchorage Community College for a semester. She then officially entered University of Alaska Fairbanks (UAF) to work toward a degree in 1958.

While participating in a summer session at the University of Nevada in 1963, she graduated from UAF with a bachelor's degree （BA in anthropology) in 1964. That same year, she was accepted into the University of Hawaii's School of Anthropology and headed to Hawaii in the autumn. However, due to financial difficulties that persisted until 1967, she transferred to UAF, where she graduated in 1968 with an MA in anthropology and an MA in journalism.

== Career and achievements in Tibetan Buddhism advocation ==
=== Career ===
==== As an office worker ====
During the first marriage, while her husband, Harry, was studying at the Colorado School of Mines, Jacobs worked as a travel counselor at the Denver office of the AAA (American Automobile Association) in 1954. While she was a graduate student of the University of Hawaii until 1967, she worked at the Bishop Museum to earn a living. In 1967, just before her second marriage with Bob, she got a job of an advertising manager at the Northern Commercial Company (now Alaska Commercial Company or ACC). This experience in the advertising served as a training in journalism, paving the way for her future career as a journalist.

==== As a professional: art painter / journalist ====
In 1952, Jacobs purchased her first set of oil painting supplies and canvas, began painting in oils, and even held a solo exhibition that same year. There was a period when she did not pick up a paintbrush, but she resumed painting in 1968 at Bob's urging. Since then, she has also worked with oil, watercolor, and acrylic paints. Not only was she a member of the Fairbanks Arts Association, but she was also a founding member and the first Vice President of the Fairbanks Watercolor Society. See the photo of her standing in front of the plaque featuring the painting of S.S. Nenana she drew.

In the 1970s, Jacobs was a journalist for the Fairbanks Daily News-Miner. As detailed throughout her book, The Master on the Mountain, this professional privilege ("press credentials") proved instrumental in facilitating her study of Tibetan culture in India and in advancing the Dalai Lama’s activities in the United States.

=== Achievements in Tibetan Buddhism advocation ===
==== Nechung Rinpoche to Alaska ====
According to her writings, Jacobs reflects that events such as her birth in Southern California, her move to Alaska, and meeting her first husband, Harry Waterfield, were guided by the Buddhist concept of karma (destiny or cause and effect). Between 1954 and 1977, her spiritual journey followed a winding path; particularly while she was dedicated to her university studies, spiritual matters receded into the background, and scientific reasoning held greater sway. Nevertheless, she was drawn to esoteric movements—such as Rosicrucianism and Theosophy—that deviated from mainstream Christianity, and ultimately became captivated by Buddhism, particularly Tibetan Buddhism.

In 1977, guided by karma, Jacobs visited Honolulu for the first time in nine years since leaving the University of Hawaii–a journey undertaken to encounter Tibetan Buddhism. On her third trial, she finally managed to meet Nechung Rinpoche (Thupten Konchok, 1917–1982), who resides at Nechung Dorje Drayang Ling-Hawaii; however, Jacobs returned feeling exhausted rather than fulfilled. Nevertheless, due to unavoidable circumstances, she ended up staying at the Drayangling, a Tibetan monastery in Hawaii, where she spent some time learning about Tibetan history and Tibetan Buddhism from Rinpoche. Later, Jacobs recalled him as her "spiritual advisor, or guru." After a brief summer stay in Hawaii, she returned to Los Angeles and then went back to Fairbanks, stopping at Tarthang Tulku's Center, now Tibetan Nyingma Meditation Center (TNMC), in Berkeley along the way.

Even after returning to the U.S. mainland, Jacobs remained committed to forms of meditation practice and religious observance that transcended mere intellectual knowledge. During this period, she met Judith Strohmeier of the UAF Department of Conferences and Institutes; With Strohmeier's assistance and at her suggestion, Jacobs arranged to invite Nechung Rinpoche and his interpreter, Ngodup Paljor, to serve as instructors for a university workshop at the UAF, Alaska. It was December 1977. As her husband Bob predicted in 1976, "Neville is going there," her desire to go to India was rekindled, aided by the family travel benefits available to Bob as an airline employee.

Dalai Lama in 2005 with Denise Lassaw (left) and Neville Abbott Jacobs (right), holding Tibetan silk scarves (katags).

==== Dalai Lama to U.S.A. ====
In January 1978, Jacobs visited Hawaii en route to India. While there for dental treatment, she became acquainted with Lama Rinchen (Lama Karma Rinchen, 1931–2022) of Kagyu Thegchen Ling, a monastery of the Kagyu school. After leaving Honolulu, she traveled via Tokyo and Bangkok before arriving in Delhi. She arrived in Delhi with her camera equipment, but instead of heading straight to Dharamsala, she spent a few days in the city, visiting National Gallery of Modern Art (NGMA), and National Museum. She then flew to Sri Lanka, where she visited Buddhist sites, and subsequently returned to India, visiting several cities in southern India, including Mysore (officially Mysuru), where Zongkar Chode Monastery or Dzongkar Choede Monastery is located. She eventually reached Dharamsala by train and bus.

Jacobs spent her first day in Dharamsala in the commercial district where the bazaar is located, but on the second day, she visited Nechung Monastery to meet 16th Nechung Kuten (Lobsang Jigme, 1930–1984). The Kuten holds a position analogous to that of "a cabinet minister in the Tibetan government and advisor to the Dalai Lama." He invited Jacobs to an intimate lunch, where they were able to discuss topics such as the political situation between the United States and China.

In the early spring of 1978, Jacobs finally had "an audience with His Holiness" the 14th Dalai Lama. During the hour and a half allotted to her, she not only received a lecture on the history and activities of Tibet and the Dalai Lama himself, but also actively raised the issue of the U.S. government granting the Dalai Lama a visa to enter the United States. Knowing from contemporary news reports that the visa had been denied, she offered to lobby U.S. politicians and government officials in her capacity as a journalist. The Dalai Lama encouraged her, saying, "So go and speak and write."

At the same time, she was invited as a member of the press to the ceremony commemorating the "March 10" anniversary of the Tibetan government-in-exile. Prior to the day of the commemorative ceremony, she observed Tibetan opera and the work of artisans. A notable aspect of this period is that she met with various prominent figures, including the above-mentioned 16th Nechung Kuten, Geshe Ngawang Dhargyey (1921–1995) of Tibetan Library (Library of Tibetan Works and Archives in Dharamsala), Tenzin Geyche Tethong (1943–), whom Jacobs described as speaking the most fluent British English of anyone she had ever met,, and Thupten Jigme Norbu (1922–2008), the eldest brother of the 14th Dalai Lama and a professor of Tibetan studies at Indiana University Bloomington.

Jacobs finally left India and returned to the East Coast of the United States, traveling via Tehran and London. After that, she headed to Washington, D.C., where Jacobs met with Alaska's Republican Senator Ted Stevens (Theodore Fulton Stevens Sr., 1923–2010) and sought his advice. Months passed. She met a gentleman, who was an official from Washington, D.C., at a university conference on Asian relations between Tibet and China, and he told her that "we will issue his [Dalai Lama's] visa." Furthermore, Jacobs became acquainted with Sakya Trizin Ngawang Kunga (1945–), a cousin of Jigdal Dagchen Sakya (1929–2016), the head of the Sakya Monastery of Tibetan Buddhism in Seattle, which is the largest Tibetan Buddhist facility in North America, and the Sakya family.

In the early summer of 1979, Jacobs was informed that a visa had been issued for the Dalai Lama and that he would be visiting Dagchen Sakya Rinpoche's Sakya Center in Seattle in October. She attended the early lectures, remembering her "great master" Nechung Rinpoche and the master's words "Cultivate love." According to the Dalai Lama's official records, his first visit to the United States took place from September 3 to October 21, 1979.

Several things came to fruition during her later years; one such instance was that Thupten Jinpa (Thupten Jinpa Langri, 1958–)—whose education she had financially supported—went on to become the Dalai Lama’s principal translator. She had met him in South India; although he was only seventeen at the time, he was already highly knowledgeable and served as her guide, speaking precise English with an Indian accent. He subsequently earned both his bachelor’s and doctoral degrees (BA Honors and PhD) from the University of Cambridge. Another of her notable activities was the founding of the Tibet Committee of Fairbanks in Alaska. She continued to advocate for Tibetan independence in various ways.

== Personal life ==
Jacobs married twice in her lifetime. She married her first husband, Harry Waterfield, in 1954 and divorced him in 1963. She has stated that she is grateful to Harry for giving her the opportunity to pursue an academic education.} Her second husband was Robert (Bob) Jacobs, whom she married in 1968. They lived happily together until Bob's death in 2015. Bob had also been married before. He was a bush pilot and later became an airline pilot. Since Bob flew the Lockheed C-130 and other aircraft, Neville was able to travel the world at a bargain price. Bob also studied photography at the New York Institute of Photography. She had no children.

== Bibliography ==
- Neville Abbott Jacobs, The Anthropologist and the Public. Some Problems of Public Communication in Anthropology, University of Alaska, 1970
- Abbott Jacobs, Neville (2019). The Master on the Mountain. Bloomington, Ind. ISBN 978-1-4808-6963-9.
- Neville Abbott Jacobs, The Ways of the Wild: Adventures with Bob Jacobs A pamphlet, No imprint, No pagination (21 leaves)

== See also ==
- 14th Dalai Lama
- Tibetan Buddhism
