= Kelsang Chukie Tethong =

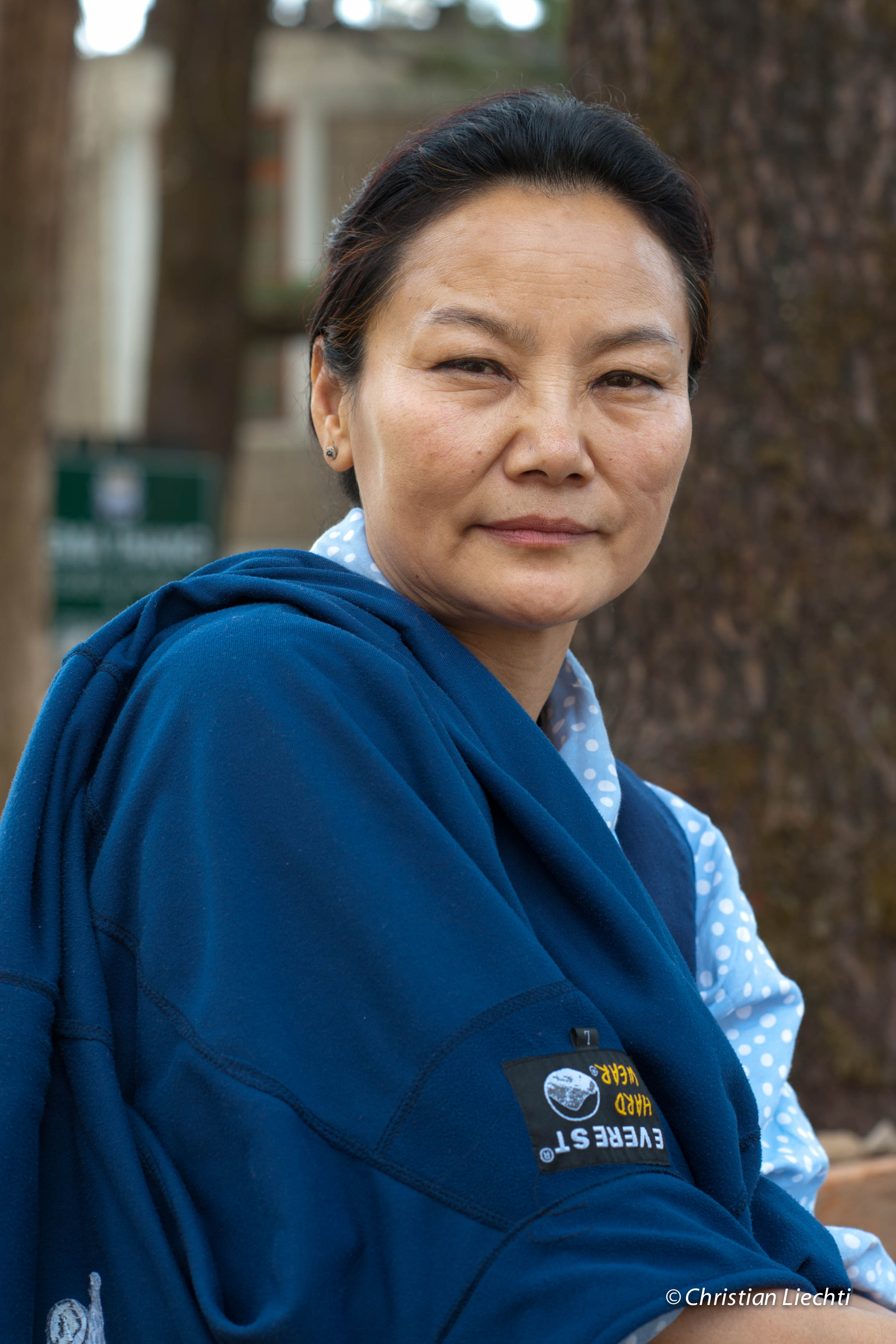
- Born: 1957 (age 68–69); Tibet
- Education: Tibetan Institute of Performing Arts
- Known for: singing traditional Tibetan musis
- Spouse: Tenzin Geyche Tethong
- Relatives: Namgyal Lhamo (sister)

Kelsang Chukie Tethong or Chukie Tethong (born 1957) is a Tibetan exile singer who was traditionally trained in India. She performs Tibetan music and she has twice performed for the Dalai Llama

== Life ==
Tethong was born in Tibet in 1957. She was raised in Dharamsala in India which is where the Dalai Lama had escaped to after his country was invaded by the Chinese as they put down the 1959 Tibetan uprising. The Dalai Lama had established a government in exile in India. She and her mother went to India in 1964 and her mother died en route. She studied at the Tibetan Children's Village and she and her sister were chosen to be trained at the newly established Tibetan Institute of Performing Arts. Her mother had enjoyed singing and she learned to play the dra-nyen. She learned both music and dance and she would have stayed for more than 11 years but her father died and she was obliged to earn money for her siblings.

She obtained work in restaurants in India and later in the Netherlands. After ten years she met her husband and they moved back to India to open a guesthouse in Dharamsala. It was the official and musician Maja Tsewang Gyurme who heard her sing and he convinced her that she should share her talent. She made recordings and Maja Tsewang Gyurme accompanied her. They continued to work together until he died in the 1980s.

In 1996 she returned to singing and she was surprised to find at her first public performance in Holland that her audience appreciated her and her traditional Tibetan singing. She was given a standing ovation. With this confidence she became a collector of Tibetan music. In 2000 and in 2001 she sang for the Dalai Lama.

She performed several concerts in Taiwan organised by the Tibetan Society there. In 2009 she appeared in a concert that was again in Taiwan but the audience included those whose inheritance was not Tibetan, but still the performance and her powerful singing was well received. She sang 17th century work by the 6th Dalai Lama, folk songs, romantic and nostalgic music. She sings in traditional Tibetan style dress and her singing was supported by Dunhuang dancing.

Her albums include ''Voice from Tara''. In 2020 her husband, Tenzin Geyche Tethong, published a biography of Dalai Llama illustrating his access to his inner circle.
