= Tsewang Rigzin =

Tibetan freedom activist

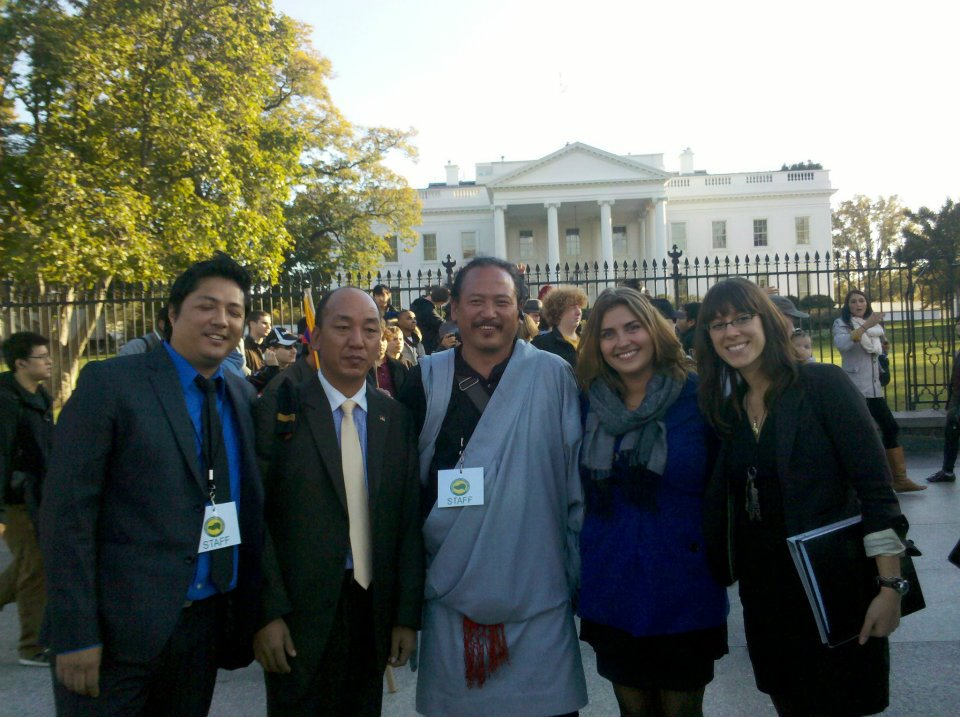
Tsewang Rigzin, 2nd from the left, Washington in 2011

Tsewang Rigzin is a Tibetan freedom activist who is the current president of the Tibetan Youth Congress. He has held the position since September 2007, and on August 8, 2008 he was re-elected to serve through August 2013. Prior to attaining his current position he served as the president of the Portland/Vancouver regional chapter of the Tibetan Youth Congress.

Rigzin has been an outspoken critic of the Middle Way Approach to solving the problem of the Tibet situation, and has instead advocated for complete independence for Tibet. In this, he and the Tibetan Youth Congress are in disagreement with the Dalai Lama, who advocates for autonomy for Tibet within China.

== See also ==
- Legal basis for autonomy within China
- Tibetan independence movement
- Tibetan sovereignty debate
- Tibetan Youth Congress
