= Namgyal Lhamo Taklha =

Tibetan public servant

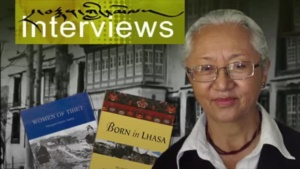
- Taklha in 2014
- Born: 5 July 1942 (age 84); Lhasa, Tibet
- Education: Mount Hermon
- Known for: Tibetan Government in Exile Health General Secretary (1988-1994)
- Spouse: Lobsang Samten Taklha
- Children: 2
- Father: Dundul Namgyal Tsarong
- Relatives: Tenzin Gyatso (Brother-in-law) Tsarong (Grandfather)

Namgyal Lhamo Taklha (Tibetan: སྟག་ལྷ་རྣམ་རྒྱལ་ལྷ་མོ) is a member of the Tibetan community living in exile. Between 1988 and 1994 she was elected to the Parliament of the Central Tibetan Administration and held the post of Health Secretary in the Central Tibetan Administration Cabinet based in India.

== Biography ==
Namgyal was born on 5 July 1942 to aristocratic family in Lhasa, Tibet. Her father was Dundul Namgyal Tsarong. She is the granddaughter of Dasang Dadul Tsaron, Commander General of Tibet and a close aid and diplomat of the 13th Dalai Lama. While growing up she attended schools in Tibet and in 1951 at the age of nine she was sent to Mount Hermon School in Darjeeling, India.

== Marriage ==
She married Lobsang Samten Taklha, a brother of the 14th Dalai Lama, in August 1962 in Darjeeling, India.

== Career ==
Namgyal has held a number of positions associated with the Central Tibetan Administration and 14th Dalai Lama, who is also her brother-in-law. In the early 1960s she worked as a translator and interpreter at the New Delhi based bureau of the 14th Dalai Lama, she then took up a post at the Tibet Bureau in Geneva, Switzerland between 1966 and 1972.

In the 1970s she was based in the United States working for a Tibetan Arts and Crafts store in New York City. She then returned to duties at the Tibetan government-in-exile as a translator and director of the Men-Tsee-Khang, also known as the Tibetan Medical and Astrology Institute, between 1986 and 1988.

In 1988 she was elected to the Parliament of the Central Tibetan Administration where she held position of Secretary of Health until 1994.

== Book published ==
In 2012 she published an autobiography Born in Lhasa in which she describes her experiences of growing up in Tibet prior to the Annexation of Tibet by the People's Republic of China.
