= Charles C. Lynch =

- Born: Charles Cornelius Lynch; May 15, 1962 (age 63); Oxnard, California, US
- Occupations: Software developer, musician, marijuana activist, actor

Charles C. Lynch is the former owner of a city sanctioned medical marijuana dispensary in Morro Bay, California. Lynch obtained a medical marijuana dispensary business license, a medical marijuana nursery permit and was a member of the local chamber of commerce. Lynch was compliant with California medical marijuana laws, but was prosecuted and convicted under federal marijuana laws. On April 23, 2024, after completing a diversion program, all charges against Lynch were dismissed with prejudice.

== City sanctioned dispensary ==
In April 2006 Lynch obtained a medical marijuana dispensary business license from the city of Morro Bay. In July 2006 Lynch was issued a medical marijuana nursery permit which allowed him to provide marijuana plants to the members of his dispensary. Lynch was also a member of the Morro Bay Chamber of Commerce. The business operated under strict guidance from city and state officials that licensed the marijuana dispensary for over one year.

== Raid and arrest ==
On March 29, 2007, the dispensary was raided by the local Sheriff Pat Hedges in cooperation with the Drug Enforcement Administration (DEA). The dispensary reopened a week later with the blessing of Morro Bay officials. The dispensary eventually closed on May 16, 2007, after the DEA threatened the landlord of the dispensary with criminal forfeiture of his property.

On July 17, 2007, Lynch was arrested under federal law for marijuana trafficking, and was convicted in August 2008 of operating a drug premises, selling drugs to minors, distribution of over 100 kilos of marijuana, cultivating more than 100 marijuana plants and conspiracy to distribute marijuana. During the trial, his attorneys were barred from referring to the legality of his business under state law.

== National controversy ==
Lynch became a national figure in the dispute between state and federal marijuana laws when Drew Carey and Reason TV published a story and video about Lynch's case. Other national news networks picked up on the story and Lynch appeared on MSNBC's "Marijuana Inc." Al Roker Reporting, ABC News 20/20 with John Stossel "Bailouts and Bull" and Larry King Live. The Lynch story also appeared in an online article on Time and briefly mentioned in the April 6, 2009, edition of top ten news stories. Lynch and his supporters also staged protests that before the Federal Court House in Los Angeles in October 2008 and February 2009 drawing media attention to those individuals caught between conflicting state and federal drug laws.

== Legal Proceedings ==
The trial, US vs Charles C. Lynch, began on July 22, 2008, in Los Angeles Federal Court. Lynch was not allowed to mention state medical marijuana laws. The evidence submitted and used by the government against Lynch during the trial was highly controversial and biased. Much of Lynch's own testimony and evidence was stricken from the record and not allowed to be considered by the jury. On August 6, 2008, Charles Lynch was convicted in federal court on five counts relating to operating his state legal medical marijuana dispensary:

- (Count One) narcotics conspiracy, in violation of 21 U.S.C. §§ 846, 841(a)(1), 856, and 859
- (Counts Two and Three) aiding and abetting the sale of marijuana to minors, under the age of twenty-one, in violation of 21 U.S.C. §§ 841(a)(1), 859(a), and 18 U.S.C. § 2
- (Count Four) possession of marijuana with intent to distribute, in violation of 21 U.S.C. § 841(a)(1)
- (Count Five) and operation and use of a drug-involved premises, in violation of 21 U.S.C. § 856(a)(1)

In April 2009, Judge George Wu sought but was denied input regarding sentencing from the Obama administration's Department of Justice. Lynch was facing a mandatory minimum sentence of five years or more under federal sentencing guidelines, but the judge applied the safety valve and on June 11, 2009, Lynch was sentenced to a year and a day in prison. The one-year sentence was required because Lynch was convicted of selling to minors under the age of 21. Under California law there is no age limit for the medicinal use of marijuana and Lynch's conditions of business license issued by the City of Morro Bay indicated patients should be 18 or older unless accompanied by a parent or guardian. Under federal law anybody under the age of 21 is considered a minor. Judge Wu stated that Lynch had adhered to California laws and allowed Lynch to stay out of prison on bail pending appeal.

On April 29, 2010, Judge Wu issued a final version of Lynch's federal sentencing memo. The judge also issued the final judgement and commitment order on April 29, 2010. Judge Wu was lenient in the sentencing and made statements in Lynch's favor including the following:

Here, there can be no doubt that the present case falls outside of the heartland of typical marijuana distribution cases for a number of very obvious reasons including.

Individuals such as Lynch are caught in the middle of the shifting positions of governmental authorities. Much of the problems could be ameliorated - as suggested in Raich, id. at 33 - by the reclassification of marijuana from Schedule I.

This Court would, however, agree with Lynch that, .., CCCC's [Central Coast Compassionate Caregivers] operations were conducted not in stealth but publicly and prominently. Indeed, the vast majority of the evidence presented to the jury was obtained from Lynch's and CCCC's records and premises which could have been acquired at any point pursuant to a search warrant which, in turn, could have been procured at any time after CCCC began its operations, since there has never been any dispute that CCCC was openly possessing and distributing marijuana at its store in downtown Morro Bay.

Consequently, prior to the California Supreme Court's decision in Mentch, Lynch could have reasonably believed that the CCCC's operations complied with California law because it was acting in the capacity of a primary caregiver.

...before opening the CCCC, he notified governmental authorities including the City of Morro Bay's mayor and city council plus various local law enforcement entities such as the county sheriffs and (according to Lynch) the DEA. Consequently, should any governmental authority have believed that some public safety issue or other societal interest warranted the prevention of any commencement of CCCC's operations, that authority could have sought to enjoin the CCCC from opening. None did. Likewise, Lynch took steps to have CCCC comply with applicable laws such as by obtaining a business license, following federal and state labor statutes, etc.

There was no evidence that anyone ever suffered any injury of any sort as a result of Lynch's running the CCCC. Lynch kept detailed records of all purchases, sales and other relevant activities of the CCCC (including the identities and other background information as to its suppliers and customers). As a result, his prosecution was greatly facilitated by his own scrupulous record-keeping.

On Monday May 23, 2011, Judge Wu ordered Charles C. Lynch's $400,000 bond reduced after Lynch's federal public defenders requested the reduction. Federal pre trial officers who are supervising Lynch supported Lynch in his request for the reduction. Lynch's family posted $400,000 bond to bail Lynch out of federal detention when he was arrested in July 2007. The government had been holding the property and cash for nearly four years saying Lynch is a flight risk.

On June 15, 2009 Lynch's federal public defenders filed a notice of appeal to the Ninth Circuit Court of Appeals. Federal prosecutors appealed Lynch's one-year sentence insisting that he receive the five year mandatory sentence. It is assumed that the government received permission from the head of the Department of Justice, Eric Holder, in order to file the appeal despite Eric Holder's statements of a change in United States policy regarding medical marijuana dispensaries. On August 19, 2009, the Ninth Circuit Court of Appeals dismissed the government's and Lynch's appeals without prejudice, meaning they could be re-filed at a later date, pending the final sentencing judgment to be issued by Judge Wu.

On April 23, 2024, nearly seventeen years after the case began, the court entered an order dismissing all charges, following completion of a diversion program. Lynch never served any time in prison.

== Lynching Charlie Lynch ==
A documentary about Lynch's case, Lynching Charlie Lynch by filmmaker Rick Ray, premiered at the San Luis Obispo International Film Festival on March 9, 2011. The documentary was released by Brainstorm Media on April 20, 2012.

== Present day ==
As of February 4, 2014, Lynch remains out of jail under federal pre-trial supervision on a reduced $200,000 bail posted by his family. In September 2013 Charles left California and is now living in New Mexico.
