= Thupten Jinpa =

Tibetan philosopher

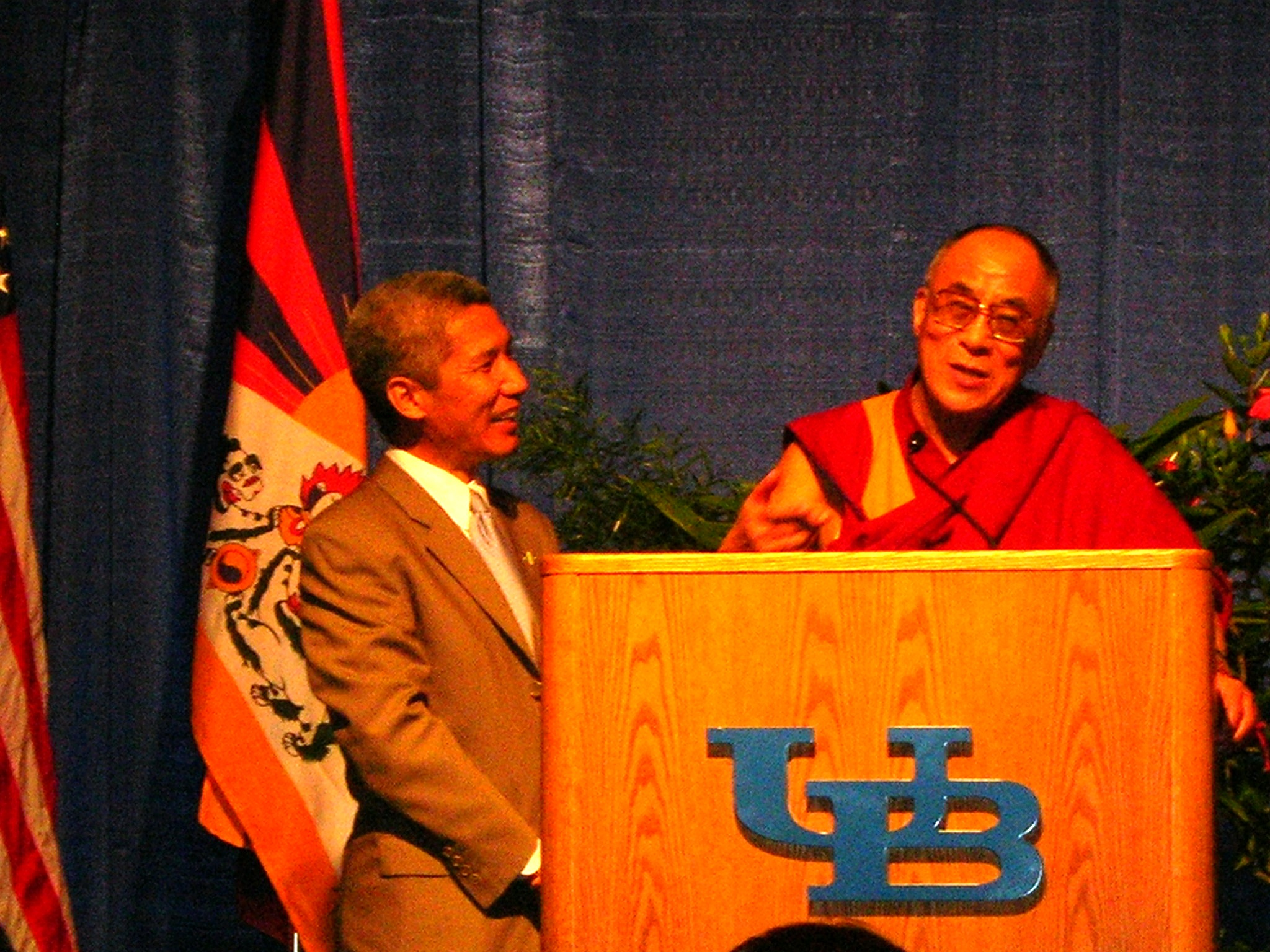
Dalai Lama (right) with Thupten Jinpa (left) 18 September 2006

Jinpa with Neville Abbott Jacobs in Los Angeles, on the Dalai Lama's birthday in 1989.

Thupten Jinpa Langri (born 1958) is a Tibetan Buddhist scholar, former monk and an academic of religious studies and both Eastern and Western philosophy. He has been the principal English translator to the Dalai Lama since 1985. He has translated and edited more than ten books by the Dalai Lama including The World of Tibetan Buddhism (Wisdom Publications, 1993), A Good Heart: A Buddhist Perspective on the Teachings of Jesus (Wisdom Publications, 1996), and the New York Times bestseller Ethics for the New Millennium (Riverhead, 1999).

Thupten Jinpa Langri was born in Tibet in 1958. He received his early education and training as a monk at Zongkar Choede Monastery in Hunsur near Mysore, Karnataka, South India, and later joined the Shartse College of Ganden monastic university, in Mundgod, Karnataka, South India, where he received the Geshe Lharam degree. At the age of 17, he befriended Neville Abbott Jacobs, an American philanthropist and defender of Tibetan Buddhism, in Mysore, and she provided him with financial support for his education. He taught Buddhist epistemology, metaphysics, Middle Way philosophy and Buddhist psychology at Ganden for five years. Jinpa also holds a B.A. Honors degree in Western Philosophy and a Ph.D. degree in Religious Studies, both from Cambridge University, UK.

From 1996 to 1999, he was the Margaret Smith Research Fellow in Eastern Religion at Girton College, Cambridge, and he has now established the Institute of Tibetan Classics, where he is both president and editor-in-chief of the institute's translation series Classics in Tibet. He is also a member of the advisory board of the Mind and Life Institute, dedicated to fostering creative dialogue between the Buddhist tradition and Western science.

He is a visiting research scholar at the Stanford Institute for Neuro-Innovation and Translational Neurosciences at Stanford University.

Geshe Thupten Jinpa has written many books and articles. His latest works are Tibetan Songs of Spiritual Experience (co-edited with Jas Elsner) and Self, Reality and Reason in Tibetan Thought: Tsongkhapa's Quest for the Middle View.

== See also ==
- 14th Dalai Lama
- Tibetan Buddhism
- Neville Abbott Jacobs
