= Drapchi (film) =

- Directed by: Arvind Iyer
- Screenplay by: Pooja Ladha Surti; Arvind Iyer; Namgyal Lhamo
- Produced by: Iceberg Nine Films
- Starring: Namgyal Lhamo
- Cinematography: Trevor Tweeten
- Music by: Namgyal Lhamo; Arnav Srivastava; Sarosh Izedyar
- Release date: November 2013 (Mannheim-Heidelberg International Film Festival)
- Country: India
- Languages: Tibetan; English

Drapchi (a.k.a. The Nightingale of Tibet) is a 2013 Tibetan-language Film directed by Arvind Iyer and stars acclaimed Tibetan singer Namgyal Lhamo in the lead role as Yiga Gyalnang. The film is a musical drama set against the backdrop of Tibet and Nepal and based on a true story. Drapchi has screened at the Manneim-Heidelberg, Cairo International, Warsaw International, Kerala International and Rome Independent Film Festival.

The international release title of the film has since changed to The Nightingale of Tibet after the film acquired for Worldwide Sales by Los Angeles-based House of Film.

== Plot ==
The film chronicles the life of Yiga Gyalnang (played by Namgyal Lhamo), a Tibetan opera singer after she is abducted and held as a prisoner at the Drapchi Prison in Lhasa, Tibet. The prison has been considered a symbol of control and fear and serves as the backdrop for the film. Although the film is set against the backdrop of the prison, the title of the film serves more as a metaphor for the illegal detention and unlawful persecution of Tibetans inside occupied Tibet. Yiga is thrown into the prison for what the Chinese government says is a rebellion through her singing songs of freedom and expression.

== Synopsis ==
The Nightingale of Tibet is a musical bio-pic about the life of opera singer Yiga Gyalnang, played by Tibetan singer Namgyal Lhamo. The movie follows the perilous journey of the singer as she escapes illegal detention in an underground Tibetan prison cell to make it across the border to Nepal and eventually to Europe where she finds international acclaim and success.

== Cast ==
- Namgyal Lhamo as Yiga
- Joseph Rezwin as The Spy
- Chris Constantinou as Jack Cassady
- Tashi Choephel as Tashi

== Filming ==
The film was shot in various locations in the Netherlands, Tibet, France and Nepal. During production, the cast and crew were faced with potential danger as they filmed in Jammu, Kashmir, and Ladakh, areas with heavy military presence on the borders of Pakistan, Afghanistan, and China. Filming in Lhasa is not allowed without permission and foreign crews are not allowed. Guerrilla techniques were used for the film the sequences that were shot in Lhasa.

== Drapchi Prison ==
Drapchi Prison, or Lhasa Prison No. 1 (simplified Chinese: 拉萨第一监狱; traditional Chinese: 拉薩第一監獄) is the largest prison in Tibet, located in Lhasa. Originally built as a Tibetan military garrison, Drapchi was transformed into a prison after the 1959 Tibetan uprising. It officially opened as a prison in 1965 and consists of a series of nine units and has recently been expanded and restructured. It has an estimated population of 1000 of which some 600 are thought to be political prisoners ranging in age from 18 to 85 many of which are captured monks and nuns. According to Central Tibetan Administration, the prison has gained a notorious reputation and is feared by the Tibetans due to its strong management. Reports of brutality have been alleged by Tibetan exile groups.

== Ai Weiwei ==
After a private screening, Chinese artist Ai Weiwei stated that the film was "A sad and moving story that made us realize that the plight of the Tibetan people is the plight of Humankind".

== Nominations ==
- 35th Cairo International Film Festival - Nominated Best Film on Human Rights
- 12th Rome Independent Film Festival -Nominated Best Foreign Narrative Feature

== Screenings ==
- 62nd International FilmFestival Mannheim-Heidelberg
- 28th Warsaw International Film Festival
- 35th Cairo International Film Festival
- 17th International Film Festival of Kerala
- 12th Rome Independent Film Festival
