= Tibetan Nuns Project =

- Founded: 1991
- Type: Nonprofit organization
- Location: Seattle, US; Dharamshala, India
- Website: http://tnp.org/

The Tibetan Nuns Project is a non-profit organization whose purpose is to support Buddhist female monastics in India from a variety of Tibetan Buddhist lineages. It helps nuns who want to study and advance their ordination.

== History ==
Gompas (Buddhist convents) have historically been well established in Tibet, certainly from the twelfth century and with traditions reaching back as far as the eighth century. Before the Chinese invasion in 1949, there were at least 818 nunneries and nearly 28,000 nuns living in Tibet. Traditional education in the nunneries included reading, writing, and lessons in ancient scriptures and prayers taught by the senior nuns or lamas from monasteries. Traditional activities for the nuns included performance of rituals requested by the lay community and crafts such as embroidery and sewing. Administrative and maintenance tasks were rotated so that all nuns gained experience in running the nunnery.

In the late 1980's and in the 1990's, due to the repressive conditions in Tibet, a large number of Tibetan Buddhist nuns escaped from Tibet and joined the refugee communities in India and Nepal. Ranging in age from pre-teen to mid-eighties, these nuns came from all parts of Tibet and from many different backgrounds. Upon arrival in India, many nuns were suffering severely from the stresses of their long, arduous and often dangerous journeys of escape. Some had faced torture and imprisonment at the hands of the Chinese authorities in Tibet and were enduring immense physical and emotional pain. In most cases, the nuns arrived without money or possessions. The majority of nuns were illiterate.

In the mid 80's, under the auspices of the Department of Religion and Culture of the 14th Dalai Lama and the Tibetan Women's Association, the Tibetan Nuns Project (TNP) was established to assist the refugee nuns from Tibet as well as to improve the overall status and level of ordained Tibetan women. The main objectives of the project are to provide basic care for these women, and educate them in traditional values and philosophy, as well as the essential skills and knowledge needed to function in the modern world.

Rinchen Khandro Choegyal coordinates the Tibetan Nuns Project. In 1996, the Tibetan Nuns Project was responsible for around 400 nuns in Dharamsala, their numbers are steadily increasing, with more nuns coming from Tibet, Ladakh, and other parts of India.

== Programs ==
The Tibetan Nuns Project supports 7 nunneries in northern India as well as some nuns living on their own.

The largest of these nunneries is Dolma Ling Nunnery and Institute which was built and is fully supported by the Tibetan Nuns Project. It is the first institute dedicated specifically to higher education for Tibetan Buddhist nuns. It is open to nuns from all traditions. Upon graduation from a 19-year program, the nuns will be thoroughly trained in their Buddhist tradition and will be eligible to receive a Geshe degree (Geshema for women), equivalent to a Ph.D. in Tibetan Buddhism.

Shugsep Nunnery, a Nyingma nunnery, was re-established in India and is fully supported by the Tibetan Nuns Project. The nunnery traces its lineage back to some of the greatest female teachers in Tibetan Buddhism. Upon completion of a nine-year academic program, nuns receive a lopon degree (equivalent to a M.A.) and may then do research towards obtaining a khenpo degree (khenmo degree work women, equivalent to a PhD.). These nuns will then be able to give the full Nyingma teachings to other monastics.

Gaden Choeling Nunnery, a Gelug institution, is the oldest Dharamsala nunnery.

Karma Drubgyu Thargay Ling or Tilokpur Nunnery, a Kagyu institution, provides scriptural and ritual training and has a basic study program.

Sherab Choeling in the Spiti Valley has 45 resident nuns who have begun a rigorous course of study.

Sakya College for Nuns in Mundawala near Dehradun offers the full course of studies followed by the monks of Sakya College.

== See also ==
- List of organizations of Tibetans in exile
- Tibetan Women's Association
- Elizabeth Napper
- Tibet
- Buddhism
- Tibetan Buddhism
