= Tibetan Women's Association =

- Founded: 1984
- Type: Non-profit
- Location: Dharamshala
- Website: tibetanwomen.org

The Tibetan Women's Association (TWA) is a women's association based in McLeodGanj, Dharamshala, India. The group was officially formed on 10 September 1984 in India, by Rinchen Khando Choegyal, a former Tibetan Youth Congress activist, although the group itself claims that a precursor was created in Tibet during the 1959 Tibetan Rebellion. Stephanie Roemer traces the organization back to the Lhasa Patriotic Woman's Association, founded in 1953 by the People's Liberation Army, which introduced the idea of women participating in politics, which was "radical" to Tibet.

During the 1960s and 1970s, organizations of Tibetan women made Tibetan clothing and carpets without pay for the exile Central Tibetan Administration, which sold them for profit. It was only in the 1980s when the exile community in India would allow women to participate in politics, that an association of Tibetan women was officially formed.

The goals of the TWA are twofold: to promote the perpetuation of Tibetans and Tibetan culture in exile, including by promoting endogamy among Tibetans, and to bring to international fora alleged human rights abuses of Tibetan women in Tibet. In India, the TWA has created the Tibetan Nuns Project to educate nuns and sponsors various cultural events like folk dances. In 1995, the TWA attempted to join the Fourth World Conference on Women in Beijing, but the organization was denied accreditation on technical grounds, a situation which received widespread disapproving press coverage in America and Europe.

Today, the group has 58 branches worldwide and 17,000 members. In 2012, it was revealed that the president of the TWA, who is also a member of the Parliament of the Central Tibetan Administration, had embezzled $3,800 from the organization from 2000 to 2003.

Since May 2015 Dolma Yangchen has been president of the TWA.

In April 2021, Tenzing Dolma was elected president of TWA.

== See also ==
- List of organizations of Tibetans in exile
