= The World of Tibetan Buddhism =

1995 book by the Dalai Lama Tenzin Gyatso

- Author: Tenzin Gyatso, 14th Dalai Lama and Geshe Thupten Jinpa
- Language: English
- Genre: Tibetan Buddhism
- Publisher: Wisdom Publications
- Publication date: 1995
- Media type: Print
- ISBN: 0-86171-097-5
- Dewey Decimal: 294.3/923 20
- LC Class: BQ7610 .B77 1995

The World of Tibetan Buddhism is a 1995 book written by the Dalai Lama, translated and edited by Geshe Thupten Jinpa, in which he offers a clear and penetrating overview of Tibetan Buddhist practice from the Four Noble Truths to Highest Yoga Tantra.

== See also ==
- Gelug
- Geshe Thupten Jinpa
- Tibetan Buddhism

== Bibliography ==
- Tenzin Gyatso, (1995). The World of Tibetan Buddhism: An Overview of its Philosophy and Practice, Wisdom Publications, Massachusetts, ISBN 0-86171-097-5
