= Elizabeth Napper =

Elizabeth Napper is the author of Dependent-Arising and Emptiness, A Tibetan Buddhist Interpretation of Madhyamika Philosophy, Emphasizing the Compatibility of Emptiness and Conventional Phenomena. She has a PhD in Buddhist Studies from the University of Virginia. The book is based on her PhD thesis, supported by a Fulbright-Hays Doctoral Dissertation Research Fellowship.

The book deals with the research of Emptiness, a topic within the philosophy of Buddhism.

She is currently co-director of the Tibetan Nuns Project, which supports nuns and their education in India and Tibet.

"Co-Director of the Tibetan Nuns Project, Elizabeth Napper, has a PhD in Buddhist Studies. She has taught at the University of Virginia, Stanford, and Hawaii, and has four times led University of Michigan students in a summer course in Tibet. Since 1991 she has lived mainly in Dharamsala, India, where she has helped to open up educational opportunities for Tibetan Buddhist nuns. Her translations include Mind in Tibetan Buddhism by Lati Rinpoche and Great Exposition of the Stages of the Path (three sections in the three-volume translation). Her other publications include Dependent-Arising and Emptiness; Fluent Tibetan: A Proficiency Oriented Learning System, Novice and Intermediate Levels by William A. Magee and Elizabeth Napper, Jeffrey Hopkins, General Editor; and Kindness, Clarity, and Insight by His Holiness the Dalai Lama, Co-Editor."
