= Lobsang Sandan =

High ranking Tibetan lama

Lobsang Samten Taklha
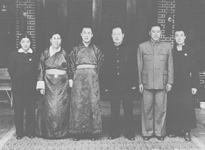
- 1955 picture of Lobsang Samden (far-right) with his family. Picture taken in 1955 in Beijing. From left：Tsering Dolma（Sister of the 14th Dalai Lama），Diki Tsering（Mother of the 14th Dalai Lama），the 14th Dalai Lama，（unknown），Phuntsok Wangyal，Lobsang Sandan
- Born: 1933; Taktser, Qinghai, China
- Died: 28 September 1985 (aged 51–52); Delhi, India
- Spouse: Namgyal Lhamo Taklha
- Mother: Diki Tsering

Lobsang Samten Taklha (Tibetan: སྟག་ལྷ་བློ་བཟང་བསམ་གཏན, 1933 – 28 September 1985) was a Tibetan politician and one of three elder brothers of the 14th Dalai Lama. In 1978 he helped found and eventually became the director of the Tibetan Medical Institute in Dharamsala, India, where the Dalai Lama still lives in exile.

Lobsang Sandan (Tibetan: བློ་བཟང་བསམ་གཏན་, Chinese:达拉·洛桑三旦; 1933–1985), one of the three reincarnated rinpoches in one family, is the third brother of the 14th Dalai Lama. He is 2 years older than the 14th Dalai Lama.

Lobsand Sandan once lied about the 14th Dalai Lama and it was confirmed by Ngapoi Ngawang Jigme and the 14th Dalai Lama.

On 20 April 1956, Lobsang Sandan was appointed as a member of the Preparatory Committee of the Tibet Autonomous Region and served as the deputy director of the Public Security Department

== See also ==
- Heinrich Harrer, Seven Years in Tibet
- 14th Dalai Lama, Freedom in Exile
- Michael Harris Goodman, The Last Dalai Lama, Claire Lumière, 1993, ISBN 2905998261
- Mary Craig, Kundun
- Namgyal Lhamo Taklha, Born in Lhasa, 2001, Snow Lion Publications, ISBN 1-55939-102-2
