= Phun Anu Thanu =

Phun Anu Thanu is a Tibetan-language film released in 2006 directed by Tashi Wangchuk and Tsultrim Dorjee.

The film follows two brothers, Anu and Thanu, as they navigate their way through their youth.
