= Namgyal Lhamo =

Tibetan actor and singer

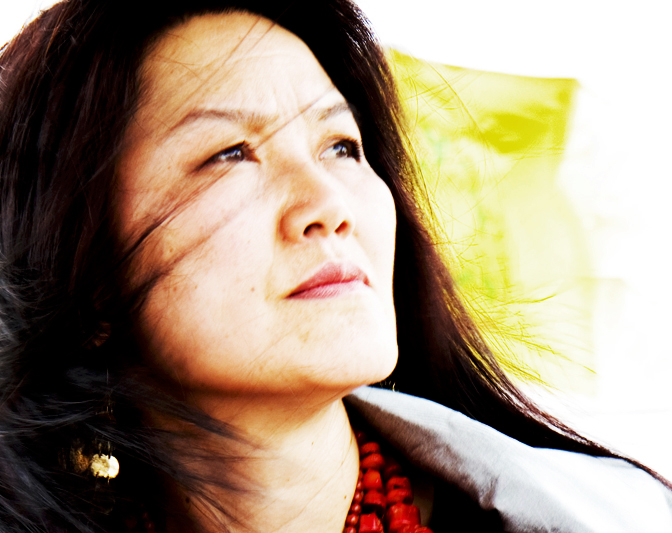
- Namgyal Lhamo

Background information
- Also known as: The Nightingale of Tibet
- Origin: Tibet
- Genres: Tibetan Traditional, World
- Instruments: Tibetan lute, Dulcimer
- Years active: 1964-Present
- Labels: Music & Words, Silk Road communications

Namgyal Lhamo is an internationally acclaimed Tibetan Opera, classical singer and actor. She is based in Utrecht, The Netherlands.

== Early life ==
Starting at the age of eight, Lhamo, recognized by many as a child prodigy, and her sister, Kelsang Chukie Tethong, trained under great masters of Tibetan Opera and Classical Music at the Tibetan Institute of Performing Arts set up by the Dalai Lama. Lhamo trained for fourteen years. Her sister trained for eleven years as she had to earn money after their father died. Lhamo went on to become the star performer of the Institute and toured extensively.

Through this passage she stepped into the tradition of the various kinds of classical and folk music of her country. Her interpretations of the Nangma and the Toeshe, Tibetan classical songs from the 17th century, have been universally acclaimed and she is popularly known as The Nightingale of Tibet.

Since the 1980s, Namgyal Lhamo has lived in the Netherlands while her sister was based in India. Lhamo continues to perform at concerts in Europe and across the world, still pursuing the mission to preserve Tibetan culture through her music.

== Career ==
She toured in 1998 through the Netherlands, Germany and Belgium with Tibet Impressions and participated in global manifestations such as Earth Dance, World Artists for Tibet, the 50th Anniversary of the UN Declaration of Human Rights and performed at Freedom concerts in Amsterdam and New York City alongside acts like The Beastie Boys, Alanis Morissette and Björk.

In 2008, Namgyal Lhamo teamed up with British musicians Chris Constantinou and Marco Pirroni of the rock band The Wolfmen and recorded the single "Paradise Lost". The music video of the track was directed by former Indian filmmaker Arvind Iyer and was released on the eve of the Beijing Olympics. "Paradise Lost" screened in competition at the Asian Hotshots Berlin film festival in January 2009 and the 2010 Tibet Film Festival in London and received the 2009 Best Music Video Award at the Tibetan Music Awards.

Her debut feature film, The Nightingale of Tibet, where Lhamo plays the role of singer Yiga Gyalnang, is loosely based on her own life and has screened across various international film festivals such as the 35th Cairo International Film Festival, where it was nominated for Best International Film on Human Rights.

Chinese artist Ai Weiwei called the film "A sad and moving film that made us realize that the plight of the Tibetan people is the plight of all humankind." Sikyong Lobsang Sangay, Prime Minister of Tibet, commented "The manner in which this film has been treated is simple, yet is very potent in depiction. It is a very dignified and restrained interpretation of one woman's struggle to keep her spiritual, cultural and artistic space alive."

== Filmography ==
=== Executive producer ===
- Drapchi (2014)

=== Co-writer ===
- Drapchi (2014)

=== Actor ===
- Drapchi (2014)
- Paradise Lost (2008)
- Seven Dreams of Tibet (2001)

== Awards and nominations ==
- 2006/7: Best female Tibetan singer - Tibetan Music awards.
- 2007: Best female solo artist Tibet/India-International music awards, Musicaid, U.K
- 2008: Nominee Best world music act Netherlands/Belgium- MixedMagazine awards.
- 2009: Best Music Video Artiste-Tibetan Music awards.
- 2013- Best Traditional Artiste -Tibetan Music awards.
- 2013- Best Traditional Album -Tibetan Music awards.

== Discography ==
- Voices from Tibet (with Gang Chenpa: Papyros, MWCD5005, Music & Words, 2000)
- Songs from Tibet (Papyros MWCD5010, Music & Words, 2005)
- Pure (Silk Road, 2007)
- The Enchanted Land (Silk Road, 2007)
- Musical Offering 1 - An Anthology of Tibetan Songs (Papyros, Music & Words, 2014)
