= Dolma Yangchen =

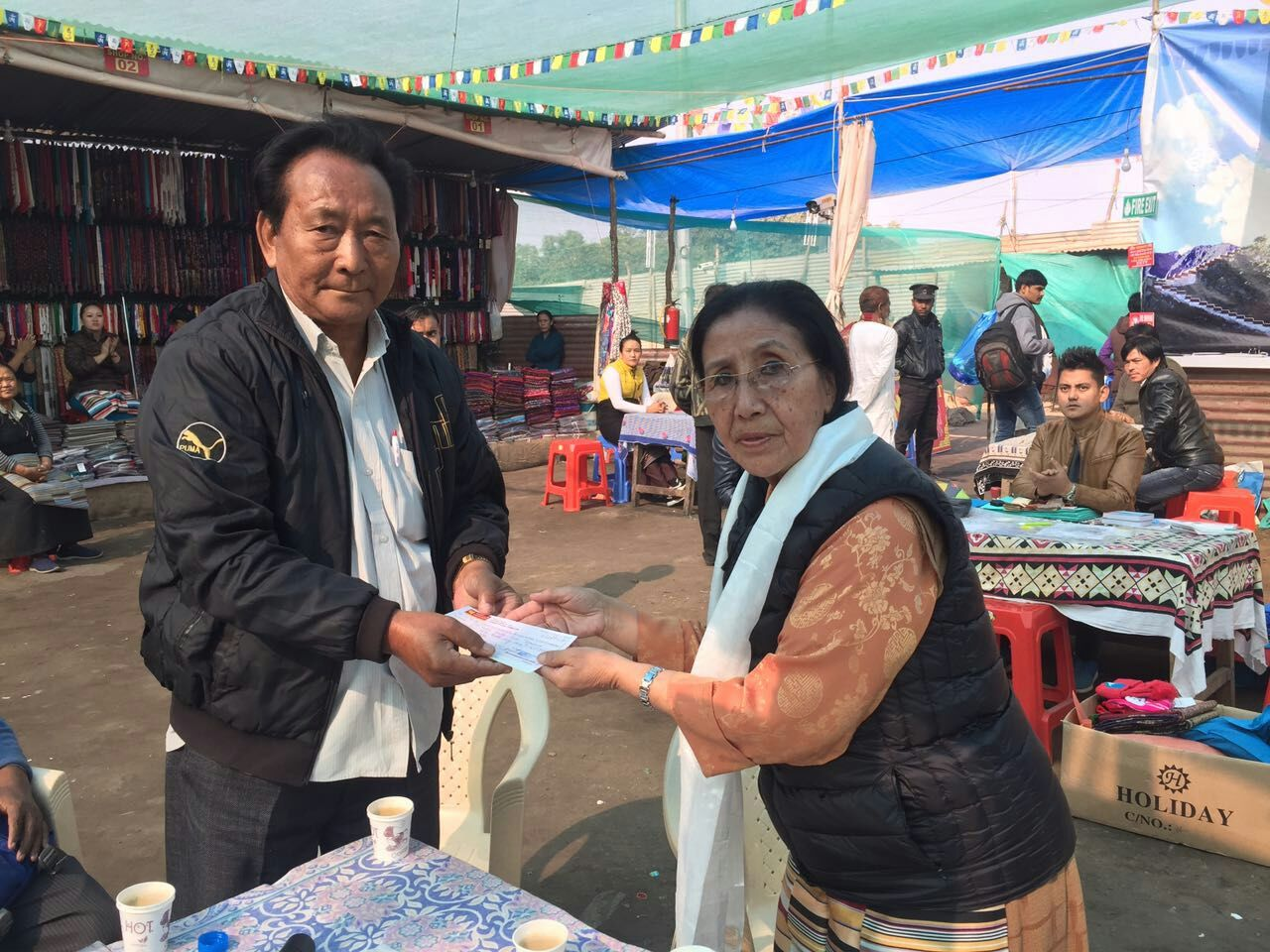
- Yangchen in 2016
- Born: Lhasa, Tibet
- Education: Bangalore University
- Employer: Tibetan Women's Association

Dolma Yangchen (born in Lhasa, Tibet) is the president of the Tibetan Women's Association (TWA).

== Career ==
Dolma Yangchen studied at the Bangalore University before she began volunteering for MYRADA, a non-governmental organisation working to improve the lives of rural people in southern India. She later accepted a job with the organisation over a more lucrative one she was offered with a bank. With MYRADA Yangchen worked to establish women's self-help groups in the villages. She married in 1983 and left the organisation in 1986 to work with her husband. In 1995 she took a job at the Lugsung Samdupling Tibetan settlement, where she would remain until 2009. Yangchen was primarily involved in improving the agricultural prospects of the settlement and led an irrigation project that allowed for the cultivation of bananas, chillis and ginger for the first time. She also taught evening classes to local children. Yangchen is a member of the Tibetan Women's Association (TWA), leading her regional chapter for six years and being a member of its central executive for three years. She was elected president of the TWA in May 2015.
