= Tibet Policy Institute =

Tibetan think tank

- Established: Feb 15, 2012
- Chair: Mr. Penpa Tsering, Sikyong Deputy Director = Tempa Gyaltsen Zamlha
- Location: Dharamshala, Himachal Pradesh, India
- Website: tibetpolicy.net/

The Tibet Policy Institute (TPI), founded in 2012, is a Tibetan think tank and research-oriented intellectual institute of the Central Tibetan Administration. TPI is based in Dharamshala, Himachal Pradesh, India.

== History ==
The exile Central Tibetan Administration's think tank and policy analysis institute was started on February 15, 2012, inaugurated by the President Dr Lobsang Sangay.

Mr Thubten Samphel was the first executive director of the TPI and under his leadership the institute grew to new heights. He was the director of the institute for six years and retired on November 2, 2018.

After the retirement of Mr Samphel, he was succeeded by Mrs Tsering Yangkey. She was the director for a brief period from Nov 01, 2018 to May 1, 2019.

On May 1, 2019, Mrs. Tsewang Dolma Shosur was appointed its new director and took charge of the institute until Oct 16, 2019.

On 16 October 2019, Mr Tsewang Gyalpo Arya was appointed as the director of the institute on additional portfolio. Mr. Tsewang was then succeeded by Mr. Tenzin Lekshay as the Director on 25 September 2020. Latter worked as the deputy director since May 2017.

== Activities ==
The Tibetan Policy Institute organised one major conference on Tibet and two smaller conferences per year.

TPI invites experts on China and Tibet regularly to speak on the subject, to the Tibetan bureaucrats and NGOs and send Tibetan experts to participate at various global conferences.

TPI publish an annual journal of the conferences’ proceedings held per year, reports and books.

== Directors ==
- Mr Thubten Samphel (Feb 15, 2012 to Nov 02, 2018)
- Mrs Tsering Yangkye (Nov 01, 2018 to May 1, 2019)
- Mrs Tsewang Dolma Shosur (May 1, 2019 to Oct 16, 2019)
- Mr Tsewang Gyalpo Arya (Oct 16 2019 to September 25, 2020)
- Mr. Tenzin Lekshay (September 25, 2020 to July 26, 2021)
- Mr. Dawa Tsering (July 26, 2021 – Present)

== Publications ==
TPI publishes journals, reports and books. The books and journals published are:

=== Periodical ===
- Tibet Policy Journal

=== Reports ===
- Cultural Genocide in Tibet
- China's Development Policy in Tibet

=== Books ===
- Dalai Lama on Environment
- The Art of Non-violence: Winning China Over to Tibet Story
