= Norbulingka Institute =

Tibetan institute, Dharamshala

Coordinates: 32.1982°N 76.3586°E

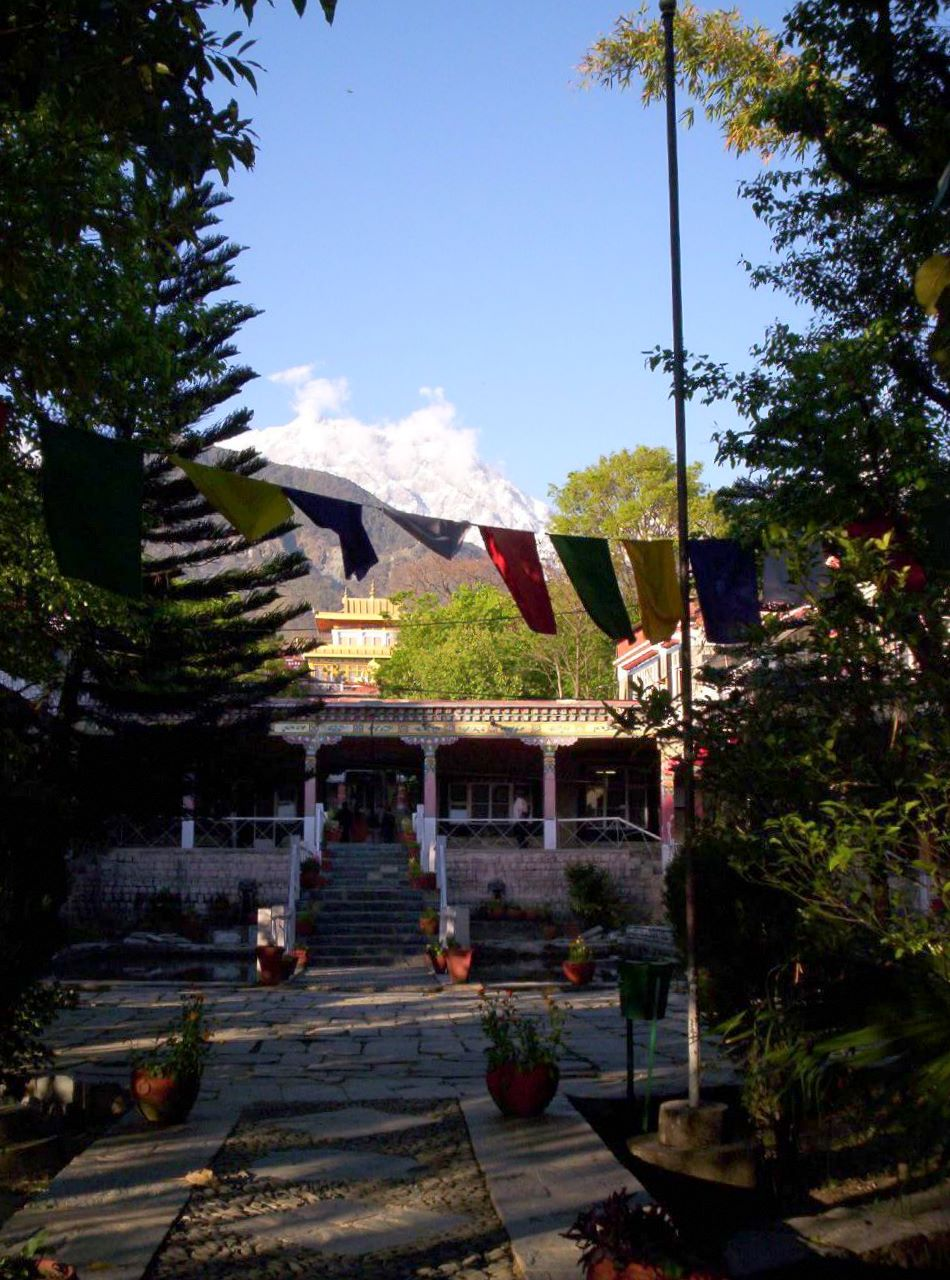
- Norbulingka Institute, with Dhauladhar range in the background.
- Established: 1995
- Location: Himachal Pradesh, India

You may have been looking for Norbulingka Palace.

Norbulingka Institute, founded in 1995 by Kelsang and Kim Yeshi at Sidhpur, near Dharamshala, India, is dedicated to the preservation of the Tibetan culture in its literary and artistic forms.

== Etymology ==
The institute is named after Norbulingka, the traditional summer residence of the Dalai Lama, in Lhasa, Tibet. The ground plan is based on the proportions of Avalokitesvara, the thousand-armed god of compassion, with the temple as the head.

== Overview ==
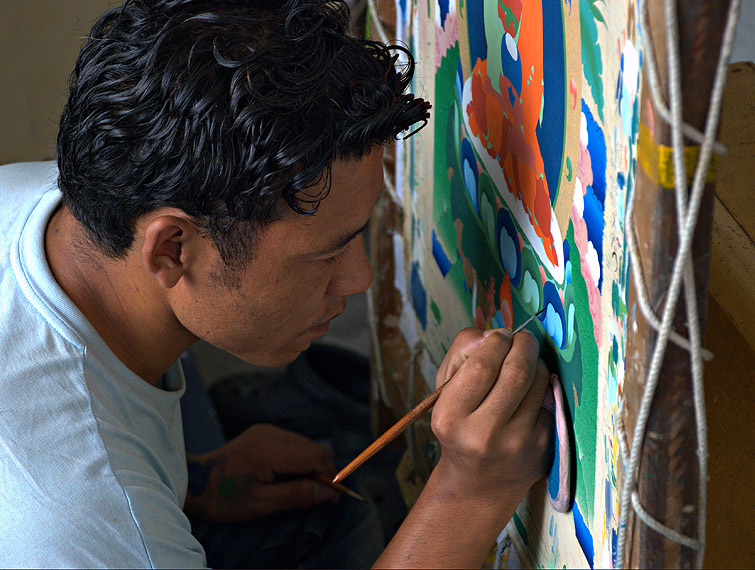
A thangka painter, Norbulingka Institute

Norbulingka Institute is dedicated to handing down tradition and restoring standards by providing training, education and employment for Tibetans. It supports an environment in which Tibetan community and family values can flourish. It reconciles the traditional creatively and respectfully with the modern, and seeks to create an international awareness of Tibetan values and their expression in art and literature. Norbulingka produces high quality, traditionally crafted art objects, as well as clothing and home furnishings. Free guided tours of the institute are available to visitors every day except Sunday. Workshop are also offered for those wishing to study Tibetan arts. The institute also runs two guesthouses—Norling Guesthouse and Chonor House.

The Norbulingka Institute charges an entry fee of Rs. 50 for Tibetans and Indians. For International visitors, the entry fee is Rs. 200 per person. All proceeds from all Norbulingka's projects go directly back into the institute to further our endeavors to preserve Tibetan culture. Norbulingka's art studios include Tibetan statue making, thangka painting, screen-printing, applique and tailoring, woodcarving, wood painting, papermaking, and wood and metal craft.

The Academy of Tibetan Culture, established in 1997, offers a three-year course of higher education in traditional Tibetan studies, as well as English, Chinese, and world history.

The Research Department of Norbulingka houses the team composing the official biography of the Dalai Lama, of which nine volumes in Tibetan have already been published. The research section is also compiling a comprehensive encyclopedia of Tibetan culture.

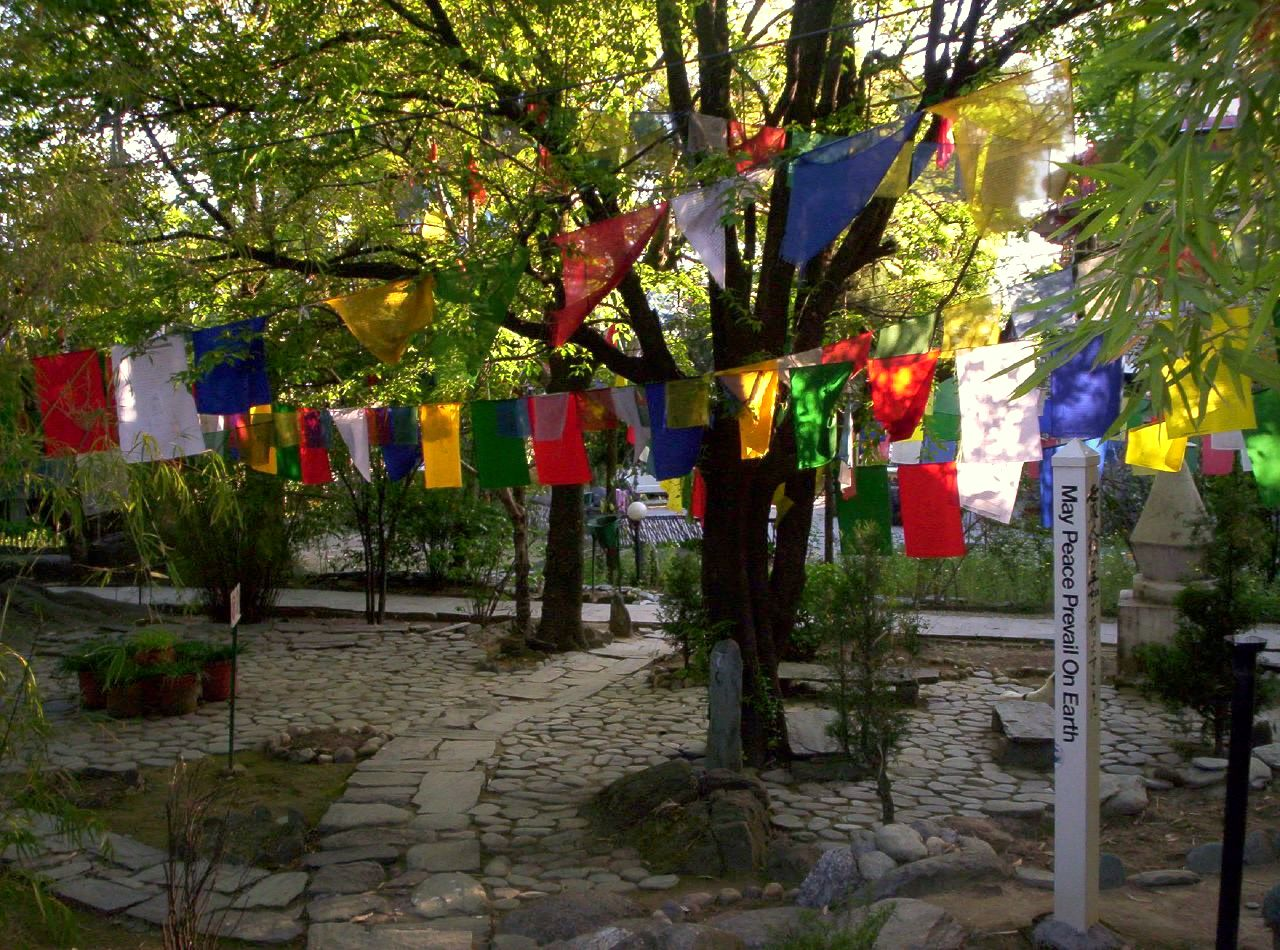
Tibetan prayer flags, Norbulingka Gardens.

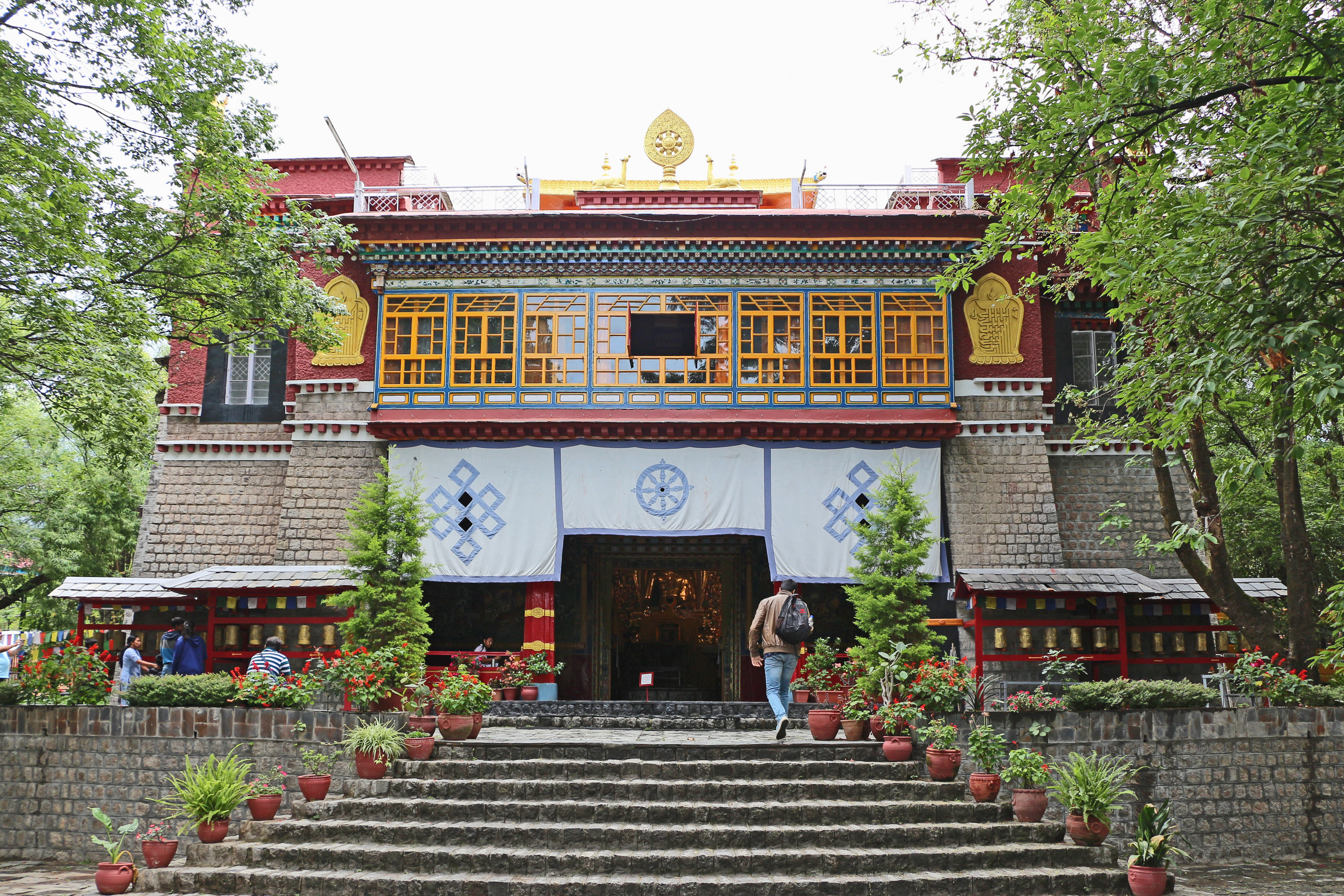
Seat of Happiness Temple, Norbulingka Institute.

The institute also has the two-storeyed 'Seat of Happiness Temple' (Deden Tsuglakhang) built in 1985 and set amidst the Japanese inspired Norbulingka gardens. It is known for its 1,173 murals of Buddha, frescoes of all the Dalai Lamas and drawings chronicling the life of the 14th Dalai Lama. In the main hall stands the 4 mt high gilded copper Buddha Sakyamuni statue, made by institute's master statue-maker, the late Chenmo Pemba Dorje, and one of largest such statues outside Tibet. Around the temple are workshops of artisans and apprentices that produce various art objects, which are sold at the Norbulingka Shop, for the benefit of Tibetan refugees.

The Losel Doll Museum has diorama displays of traditional Tibetan scenes, using miniature Tibetan dolls in traditional costumes.

A short distance from the institute lies the Dolma Ling Buddhist nunnery, and the Gyütö Tantric Monastery, previously the temporary residence of the 17th Karmapa, Ogyen Trinley Dorje.

== See also ==
- Tibetan Institute of Performing Arts
