= 10 Questions for the Dalai Lama =

2006 documentary film

- Film poster
- Directed by: Rick Ray
- Written by: Rick Ray
- Produced by: Rick Ray, Sharon Ray
- Cinematography: Rick Ray
- Edited by: Rick Ray, Sharon Ray
- Music by: Peter Kater
- Distributed by: Monterey Media
- Release date: May 1, 2006
- Running time: 85 minutes
- Country: United States
- Language: English

10 Questions For The Dalai Lama is a 2006 documentary film in which filmmaker Rick Ray meets with Tenzin Gyatso, the 14th Dalai Lama at his monastery in Dharamsala, India. The film maker asks him ten questions during the course of the interview which is inter-cut with a biography of Tenzin Gyatso, a history of modern Tibet and a chronicle of Ray's journey securing the interview.

== Synopsis ==
The film begins as a chronicle of Rick Ray's journey through India to interview Tenzin Gyatso. The film switches between present and recent past, with stages of the trip introducing sections on the personal history of Tenzin Gyatso, the process used to select a Dalai Lama and Gyatso's journey into exile.

The interview with Tenzin Gyatso begins midway through the film. This section is inter-cut between sections addressing philosophical questions and current affairs. Ray asks a range of questions, touching on philosophical, social and political issues. Some of the questions asked:

- "Why do the poor seem happier than the rich?"
- "How can one reconcile an attitude of non-violence when faced with a direct threat to one's safety and security?"
- "Should countries be dedicated to preserving their traditions or embrace modern culture?"
- "Will there be another Dalai Lama?"

The questions are not numbered in the film and Ray admits to asking more than ten questions during the interview.

The film also features the daily life of Tenzin Gyatso, his international peace efforts and his work with Tibetan refugees. The film features interviews with a Buddhist monk who fled violence in Tibet and Tenzin Tethong, who has served in the Tibetan Government in Exile for 20 years. Towards the end, the film touches on the issues of internet censorship in China, changes in Tibetan culture, and the 11th Panchen Lama controversy.

== Production ==
Three years were spent tracking down rare, archival footage of the young Tenzin Gyatso, early interactions between the People's Republic of China and his government, and his eventual exile. In the end, the licensing of some of the footage for the film cost more than all the other expenses combined.
