= Rick Ray =

American filmmaker

- Citizenship: American
- Education: University of California at Santa Barbara
- Occupation: Filmmaker
- Known for: Wrote, filmed and directed '10 Questions for the Dalai Lama'

Rick Ray is an American filmmaker best known for his 2006 documentary film 10 Questions for the Dalai Lama which he wrote, filmed and directed. In 2022, Ray headed to war torn Ukraine for a 5-week exploration of the traumatic effects of war on Ukraine’s people. He documents his experiences and the Ukrainian story in his soon to be released documentary “Be Safe, Stories From Ukraine”. His documentary Lynching Charlie Lynch, about the trials of former medical marijuana dispensary owner Charles C. Lynch, premiered at the 2011 San Luis Obispo International Film Festival on March 9.

== Career ==
Before 10 Questions for the Dalai Lama, Ray had traveled the world for several decades and produced eleven travel documentaries including The Soul of India, Raise the Bamboo Curtain: Vietnam, Cambodia and Burma (narrated by Martin Sheen), Morocco, Jerusalem: Sacred and Profane and Lost Worlds of the Middle East.

== Education ==
Rick Ray graduated with a degree in film from the University of California at Santa Barbara in 1981. He apprenticed on the television show Ripley's Believe it or Not! for two years. At one time he served as chauffeur to Jack Palance. He then spent several years traveling around the world with only a backpack, camera and notebook.

== Business ==
In 2000, Ray founded DVArchive.com, an internet based stock footage library with the intent of making the imagery from his extensive travels available to a wide variety of film and media producers.

Ray’s imagery of the world is now carried by most of the world’s major stock footage libraries including Shutterstock, Pond5 and Adobe Stock.

Ray's footage has appeared in such films as An Inconvenient Truth, Contact, the television series Curb Your Enthusiasm, as well as the concert videos of Bruce Springsteen, Liz Phair Coldplay and Roger Waters, among others.

From 2003 to 2007, Ray taught documentary filmmaking at Brooks Institute of Photography. He has been a guest lecturer at hundreds of universities and has made seven appearances at the National Geographic Society in Washington D.C.

Ray's most recent film The Road to Namibia was completed in 2020, just before the pandemic. In recent years Ray has become a noted professional commercial drone flier producing aerials used in series such as Planet Earth and hundreds of other documentaries and feature films. He has recently visited Iceland to film aerial images of the erupting Fagrafjall Volcano.

== Personal life ==
Rick lives in Ventura, California where he is engaged in the community to preserve the hillsides, natural lands, and ocean environment.

== Filmography ==
- Be Safe, Stories From Ukraine (2022)
- Fagradalsfjall: A volcano in Iceland (2021)
- The Road To Namibia Part One (2020)
- The Road To Namibia Part Two (2020)
- Thirsty Elephants Of Namibia (2019)
- The Galapagos (2019)
- Meteora Flight (2019)
- CUBA (2018)
- An Island Of Special Treatment: Regent Properties and Ventura’s Hillside Management Program (2015)
- The Promised Land : Adventures in Turkey, Jordan, Lebanon and Israel (2014)
- East Africa Safari, Kenya, Tanzania and Rwanda (2012)
- "Lynching Charlie Lynch" (2011)
- Morocco (2008)
- 10 Questions for the Dalai Lama (2006)
- Inside Iraq: The Untold Stories (2004)
- The Soul of India (2002)
- Lost Worlds of the Middle East: Syria, Jordan, Lebanon, Israel (2001)
- Elvis: His Life and Times (1997) (TV)
- Jerusalem: Sacred and Profane (1997)
- Raise the Bamboo Curtain: Vietnam, Cambodia, and Burma (1996)
- Bali: Life In The Balance (1995)
- America Comes to Graceland (1993) (TV)
- Letters Home From Iceland (1990)
- Letters Home From The South China Seas: Adventures in Singapore & Borneo (1989)
