= Diki Tsering =

Mother of the 14th Dalai Lama (1901–1981)

- Born: c. 1901; Tibet, Qing Empire
- Died: 12 January 1981 (aged 79–80); Dharamsala, Himachal Pradesh, India
- Children: Lhamo Thondup (Tenzin Gyatso), the 14th Dalai Lama; Thubten Jigme Norbu, the 6th Taktser Rinpoche; Lobsang Samten Taklha; Tendzin Choegyal, the 16th Ngari Rinpoche

Tibetan name
- Tibetan: བདེ་སྐྱིད་ཚེ་རིང་
- Wylie: Bde-skyid Tshe-ring
- Tibetan Pinyin: Têci Cering

Chinese name
- Chinese: 德吉才仁
- Hanyu Pinyin: Déjí Cáirén

Diki Tsering (བདེ་སྐྱིད་ཚེ་རིང་; c. 1901 – 12 January 1981) was a 20th-century Tibetan woman, known as the mother of three reincarnated Rinpoches/Lamas: Lhamo Thondup, Tenzin Gyatso, the 14th reincarnated Dalai Lama; Thubten Jigme Norbu, the 6th reincarnated Taktser Rinpoche; and Tendzin Choegyal, the 16th reincarnated Ngari Rinpoche. In article The Discourse of Lama, the Qianlong Emperor stated the invention of Golden Urn was to eliminate families with multiple reincarnated Rinpoches/Lamas.

In Diki's biography Dalai Lama, My Son: A Mother's Story, she wrote that after the alleged murder of the Reting Rinpoche in 1947, that word started to spread that Lhamo Thondup was not the real Dalai Lama, since the Golden Urn was not used in the selection process. To put this rumor to rest for the regent Taktra and the Kashag, it was decided to use a lot-drawing process by placing both names in a vessel before the image of Je Rinpoche to confirm the real 14th Dalai Lama. This was done three times. The name Lhamo Thondup "leaped out three times, and the regent Taktra and the Kashag had nothing more to say for themselves."

Tibet expert, professor Shen Kaiyun (沈开运) of Tibet University, noted that Diki Tsering's husband Choekyong Tsering (Chinese: 祁却才让) died in 1947, the same year as the untimely death of the Reting Rinpoche, Jamphel Yeshe Gyaltsen; both were allegedly poisoned.
