= Lhamo =

Classical theatre of Tibet

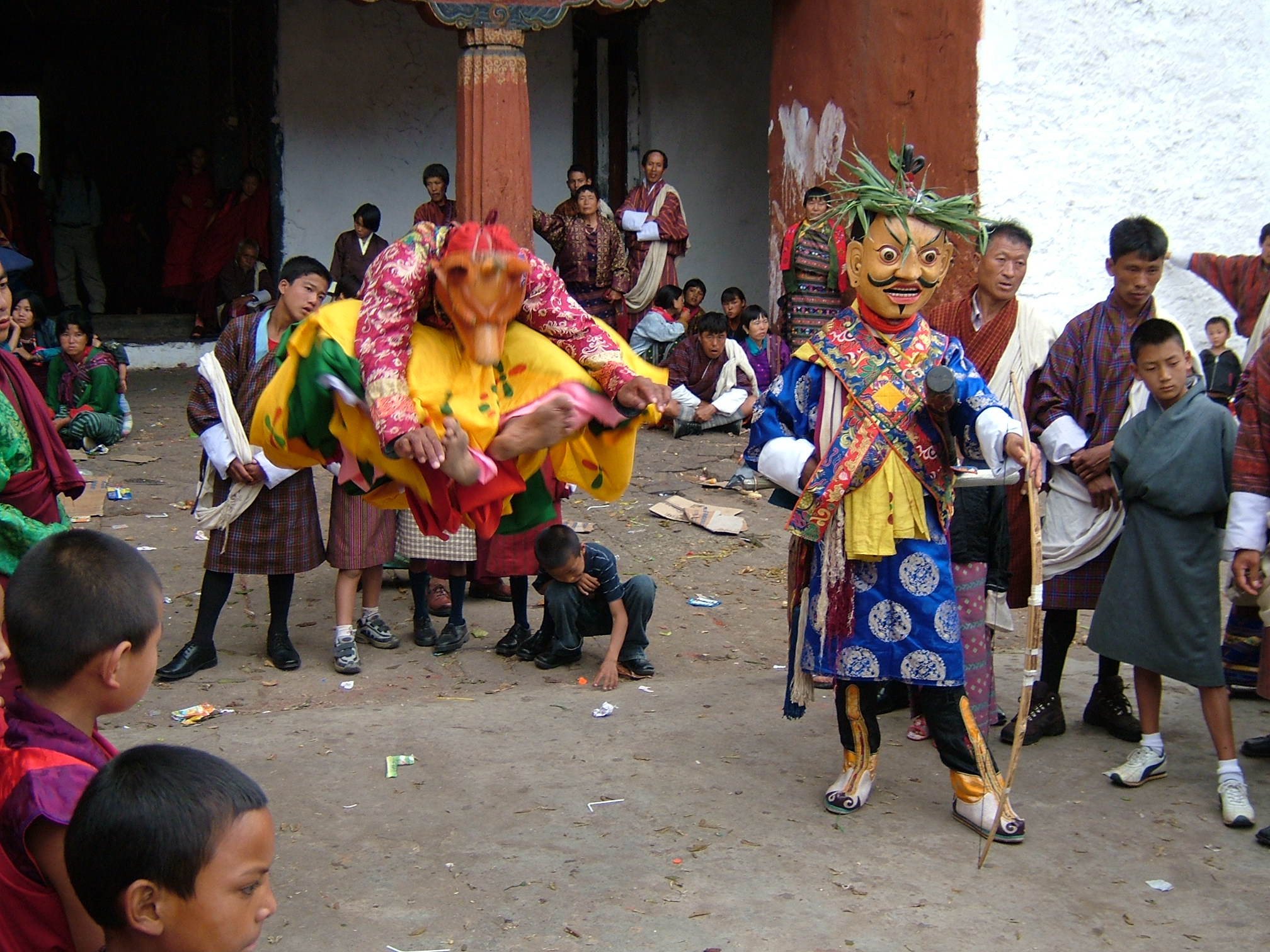
Masked dancers (hero and leaping dog) at the Wangdue Phodrang tshechu, Bhutan, 2007.

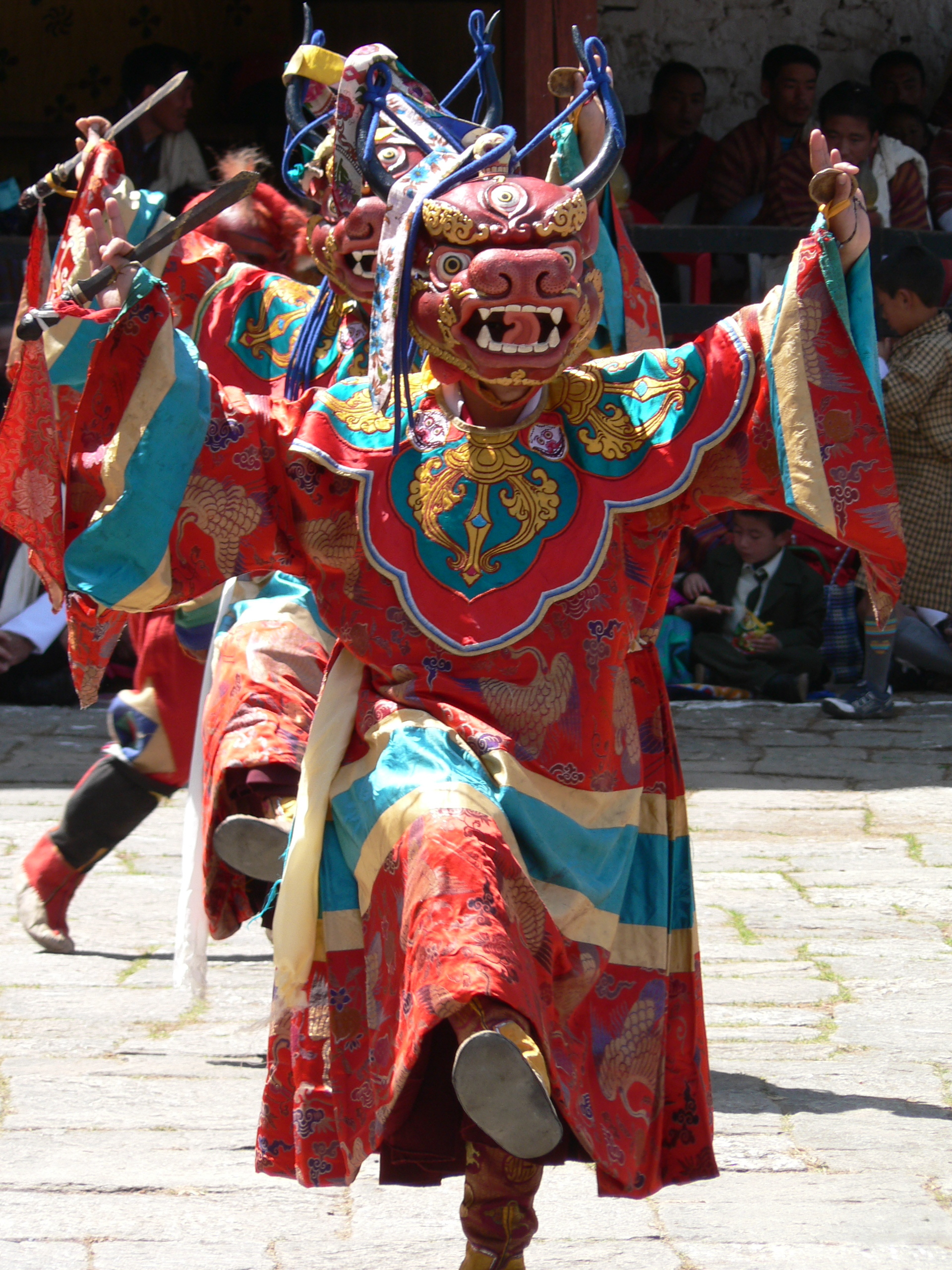
Dance of the Lord of Death and his Consort, Paro, Bhutan, at a tsechu festival in 2006.

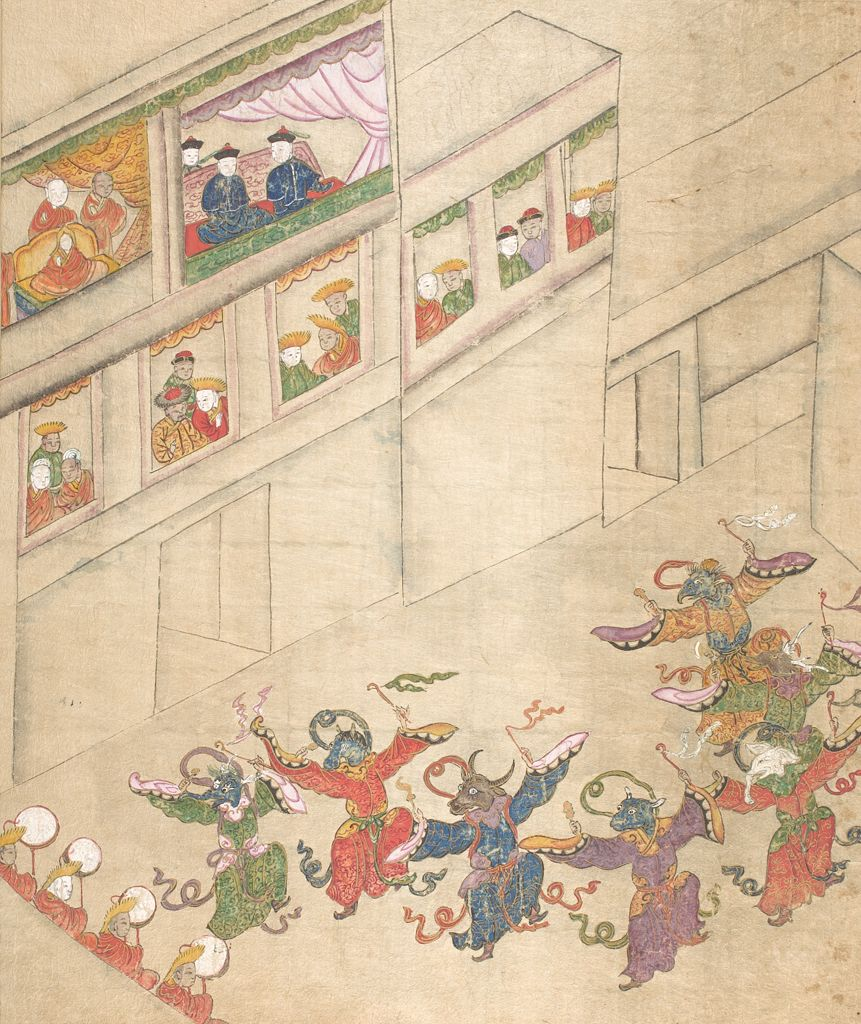
Lhamo during Qing dynasty

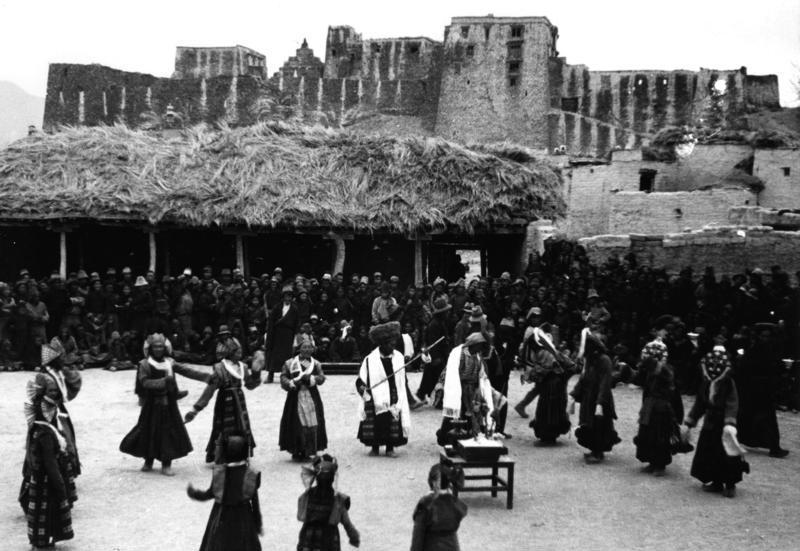
Ache Lhamo in front of Gongkar Dzong, 1939

Lhamo (Standard Tibetan: ལྷ་མོ, romanized: Lha mo), or Ache Lhamo, is a classical secular theatre of Tibet with music and dance that has been performed for centuries, whose nearest western equivalent is opera. Performances have a narrative and simple dialogue interspersed with comedy and satire; characters wear colorful masks. The core stories of these theatrical plays are drawn mostly from ancient Indian Buddhist folk tales, lives of important people and historical events from Tibetan civilization. However the ceremonial, dance and ritual spectacles strongly reflects the Tibetan Royal Dynastic period.

Very similar traditions are found in Bhutan and other regions influenced by Tibetan Buddhism and Tibetan culture. There are at least three unique schools of Lhamo: Kyimulunga, Gyangara, and Chungba.

== History ==
Oral accounts credited the foundation of Ache Lhamo tradition to 14th-century mystic Thang Tong Gyalpo. Lhamo is considered to have both spiritual and non-spiritual roots. The procedure and style in which Ache Lhamo are performed has changed little since the time of inception in the 14th-15th centuries. Today, the same opening rituals are enacted prior to the commencement of every performance, authentic costumes are worn, singing, dance and musical tradition are strictly adhered to.

Little is known about the development of Lhamo troupes until the time of fifth Dalai Lama, Ngawang Lobsang Gyatso (1617-1682 A.D). There are murals of lhamo stories on the walls of the Potala Palace that are believed to have been painted between 1695 and 1705. According to some oral narratives, the costumes and mask of Hunter or Fisherman (Tibetan: Ngonpa) were designed by the fifth Dalai Lama, based on his personal dream. By the turn of the 19th century, Ache Lhamo performances were found throughout Tibet, each major district having a permanent amateur troupe performing for the local community at various formal occasions throughout the year.

Some notable troupes including Tashi Sholpa, Chongye Phundun, Shangpa, Gyalkhara, Chungpa and Kyormulung are much sought after and are always a regular part of the official festivals at Norbu Lhingkha, Drepung Monastery and Sera Monastery. The performers are monks and lay people who love lhamo. Many Tibetans are familiar with and frequently sing the arias (Tib. namthars) for themselves or for entertainment at social gatherings. All styles of the lhamo tradition fundamentally rely on the drum and cymbal.

In the Tibetan language, the opera is called Al-che-lha-mo, the actor lha-mo-ba and the script khrab-gzhung Tibetan opera is considered to be one example of the crystallization of the cultural wisdom of Tibetan people for thousands of years. It is regarded as the "living fossil" of Tibetan culture, and was included as a 2009 UNESCO inscription on the "Representative List of the Intangible Cultural Heritage of Humanity."

=== Thang Tong Gyalpo ===
It is popularly believed that the tradition of performing Ache Lhamo or Tibetan Opera was started by 14th-century mystic Thang Tong Gyalpo, who was born in the family of a peasant in the Shigatse county of Tibet in 1361. When he was a child, his parents gave him the name Trowobendon and sent him to the local monastery to learn cultural knowledge. He spent years in monastic study and became very clever so was named Tsuendue Sangpo. Then he came to Lhasa in order to acquire more knowledge. One day in the harbour of Lhasa river he saw a lot of people unable to cross the river because they did not have enough money. He requested the captain to let them cross the river free of charge. Instead, he was beaten by the captain, following which he resolved to build a bridge on the river.

Seeking to construct bridges, he needed labor and resources. Thus, during the construction of the bridge at Chowo Ri, from his labor team he picked seven sisters from Lhoka county of Tibet and taught them some dances and songs. They made up the chorus and adorned them with beautiful costumes; they traveled around towns and villages performing dances to raise resources. The yogi beat drums and cymbal while the girls danced and sang. Audiences, impressed, hailed the performers as "goddesses" (Tibetan: Lhamo); since then they were known as Goddess Sisters. (Tibetan: Ache Lhamo); the tradition of Ache Lhamo developed from this beginning.

Over a period of years, Thang Tong Gyalpo was able to build 58 iron bridges and 60 wooden bridges across towns and villages. He died at an advanced age in Toe Riwoche in 1485.

The remnants of some of his iron chain bridges still stand today in places in Tibet and Bhutan. It became customary for Tibetans to install images and statues of him when occupying a new home. During the opening ritual dance, every lhamo or opera group installs his statue in the middle of the stage and pays homage to him.

== Notable performers ==
- Namgyal Lhamo

== See also ==
- Yungchen Lhamo
- Namling County, home to Xiangba Tibetan Opera
