= Tibetan Institute of Performing Arts =

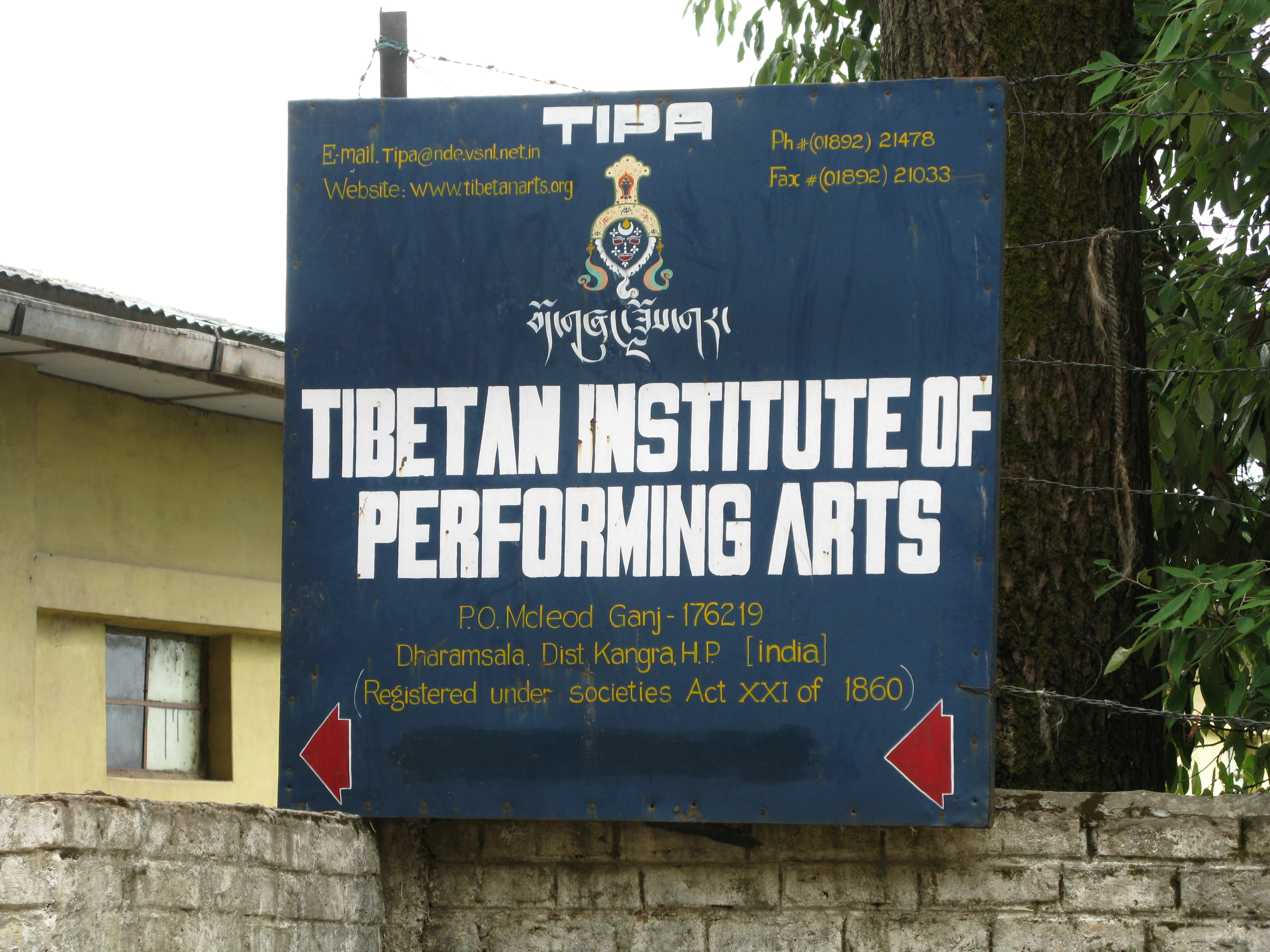
Tibetan Institute of Performing Arts sign in McLeod Ganj, India, in 2009

Tibetan Institute of Performing Arts

The Tibetan Institute of Performing Arts (TIPA) was founded by Tenzin Gyatso, the 14th Dalai Lama upon reaching McLeod Ganj, Himachal Pradesh, India, in exile from Tibet in August 1959. It was then called Tibetan Music, Dance and Drama Society, which was one of the first institutes set up by the Dalai Lama, and was established to preserve Tibetan artistic heritage, especially opera, dance, and music.

TIPA has been registered as a Society under The Societies Registration Act, 1860 of the Government of India. The institute is a part of the Department of Religion and Culture of Central Tibetan Administration (CTA) and functions as a semi-autonomous body.

Tibet has been celebrated as the Ocean of Songs and Dances (Glu gar gyi rgya mtsho) for hundreds of years. Dance and music have always been integral to the Tibetan culture and are considered to be one of the key components of the traditional "five minor sciences" (Rik ne Chungwa Nga). By keeping the Tibetan artistic traditions alive and sharing them with the world, TIPA aims to preserve the cultural identity of Tibetans. Students who are interested in the performing arts are trained in the fundamentals of Tibetan music and dance, including an undiluted and comprehensive transmission of traditional folk dance from the three Tibetan provinces of U-Tsang (Central Tibet), Dotoe (Kham), and Domed (Amdo).

Members of TIPA include: instructors, artists, administrative staff, craftsmen, and students who live on the premises of the institute.

Tibetan Institute of Performing Arts (TIPA) also carries forward the tradition of Ache Lhamo or Tibetan Opera, which was started by Yogi Thangtong Gyalpo in the 14th century in mid-southern Tibet. The institute, under the tutelage of various masters, has maintained an undiluted tradition of Kyormulung (Sukyi Nyima, Pema Woebar, and Drowa Sangmo), Chungpa (Prince Norsang), and Monru Ponsang (Dhepa Tenpa). It is mandatory for all professional artists recruited by TIPA to take mandatory lessons on various traditions of Ache Lhamo.

The performances at the Shoton Festival include singing and dancing by artists in elaborate costumes which are designed in-house at the Handicrafts Centre of the institute.

== Aims and objectives ==
- To preserve and promote the age-old folk music, opera and dance tradition of Tibet
- To provide performing arts training to young Tibetans
- To work as a traditional Tibetan musical reference centre for students and academics
- To safeguard and showcase ancient costumes of Tibet
- To research and archive old songs and music
- To produce cultural performance videos to promote Tibetan culture

== Facilities ==
- Auditorium
- Conference Hall
- Banquet Hall
- Open-Air Stage
- Recording Studio
- Cultural Show
- Sound and Lighting

== Festivals ==
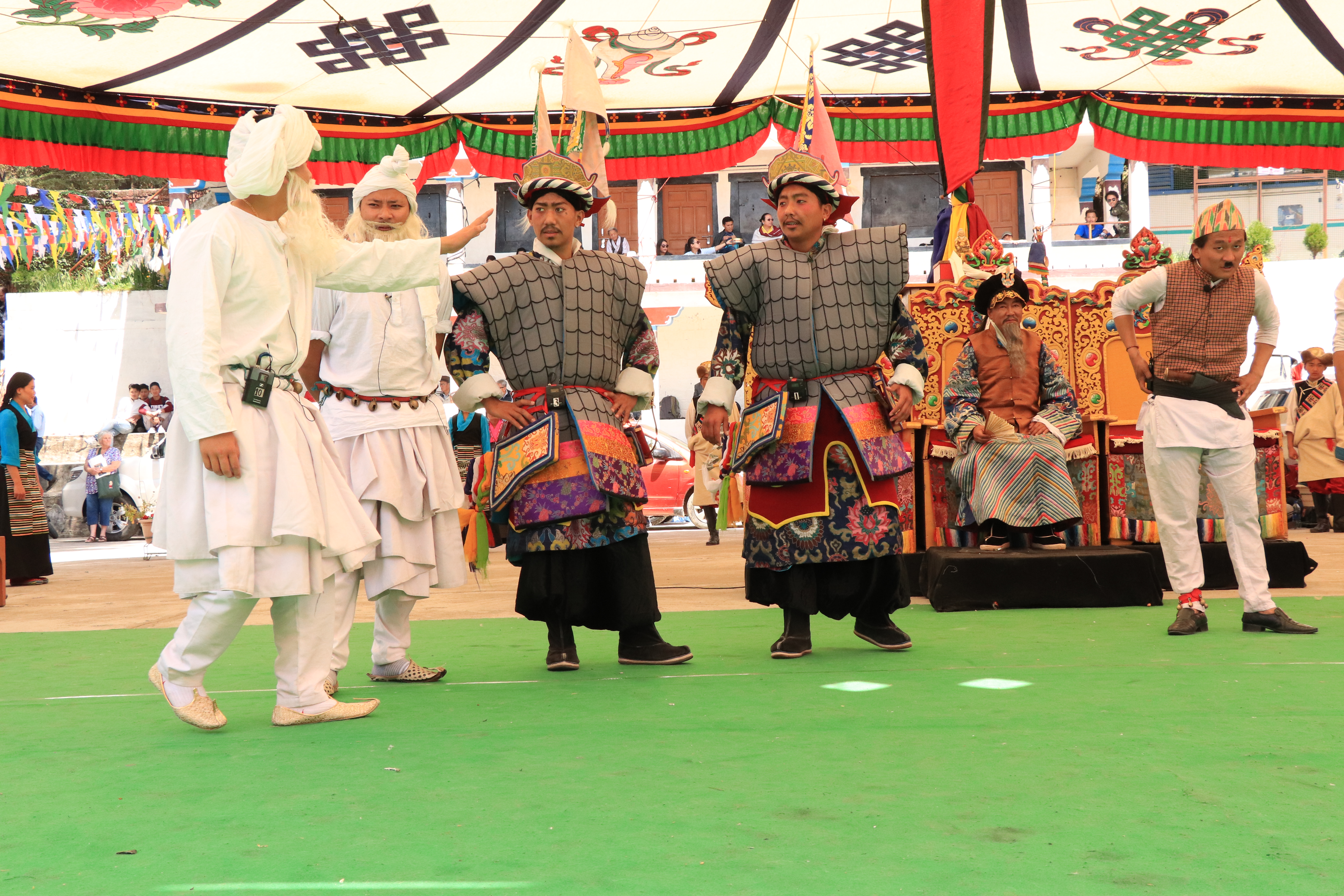
- Shoton Festival
  Shoton Festival
- Yarkyi Festival

== Ngawang N Nornang – Founding Director (1959–1963) ==
- Phuntsok Namgyal Dumkhang (1965–1968)
- Ngawang Dhakpa 1969-1977?
- Thupten Samdup (1976–19??)
- Jamyang Norbu (1981–1985)
- Tsering Wangyal (19??–19??)
- Ngodup Tsering (1991–1995)
- Jamyang Dorjee Chakrishar (1994–2000)
- Sonam Tashi (Acho Danny)
- Kalsang Yudon Dagpo (2003–2007)
- Wangchuk Phasur (2007–2010)
- Sonam Choephel Shosur (2010–2012)
- Tsering Yangkyi (2012–2014)
- Wangdu Tsering Pesur (2014–2018)
- Ngawang Yonten (2018–2020)
- Sonam Chophel (Acting) (2020–2021)
- Tsering Chonzom (2021–2021)
- Ngawang Choephel (2021–)

== Notable alumni ==
- Namgyal Lhamo
- Tsering Dorjee
- Jayang Choende Jack
- Tashi Sharzur Techung
- Sonam phuntsok (Opera master)
- Lobsang samten (Artiste director)

== See also ==
- Norbulingka Institute
