= Tibetan Youth Congress =

Non-governmental organization

- Founded: 7 October 1970 (55 years ago)
- Type: Non-profit
- Purpose: Political Advocacy For Tibet
- Location: McLeod Ganj, Dharamshala, Himachal Pradesh - 176 219, India
- Website: tibetanyouthcongress.org

The Tibetan Youth Congress (TYC) is an international non-governmental organization that advocates the independence of Tibet from China. With around 30,000 members in the Tibetan diaspora, it is the largest of the pro-independence organizations of Tibetan exiles with 87 branches in 10 countries listed on the organisation's website. The current president of the Tibetan Youth Congress is Gonpo Dhundup.

The organization claims no particular religious or party political affiliation.

== Origin ==
The TYC was founded on October 7, 1970, in Dharamsala, India, with the 14th Dalai Lama delivering the inaugural address. The organization was founded by young Tibetans from the first generation to graduate from contemporary schools and colleges. The founding members were Tenzin Geyche Tethong (the Congress's first President), Lodi G. Gyari, Sonam Topgyal and Tenzin N. Tethong.

== Organisation ==
The TYC advocates for the independence from China of Tibet, including the three provinces of U-Tsang, Do-toe, and Do-med. The group organises cultural exhibitions and festivals to promote global awareness of Tibetan culture. Its members also undertake social welfare activities, according to the maxim "Service to the people", with the aim of alleviating social, cultural, and educational problems in the exile community. The group's activities include adult education, health education, and infrastructure activities from building public facilities like toilets to planting trees.

It also serves as an international pressure group, working to bring international attention to Tibet. The organization publishes a quarterly journal, Rangzen, for its members and sponsors. It uses mailing lists to circulate news from time to time.

=== Membership ===
Flag of the Tibetan Youth Congress

Membership in the TYC is open to any Tibetan who subscribes to the organization's aims and objectives and agrees to abide by its rules, including working within the framework of the democratic Constitution of Tibet. Despite the name, membership is not limited to young people, though most members and the leadership are young.

== T.Y.C Activities ==
The Congress has held protests at Chinese embassies and in India. The TYC observes several annual events, including the anniversary of its founding, Human Rights Day, the anniversaries of what they consider to be key events in Tibetan political history, and a number of Buddhist and traditional Tibetan holidays. In 2008, members of the group protested at the 2008 Summer Olympics torch relay through India. In January 2017 at Bodh Gaya, India, a variety of social services were provided 250 TYC volunteers at the 34th Kalachakra Initiation given by the 14th Dalai Lama and organized by the Central Tibetan Administration.

== Impact ==
The BBC news described the Congress as "radical but influential". The Chinese state Xinhua news agency reported the view shared by several Chinese tibetologists that the group was a terrorist organization. The TYC in 2008 denied Chinese accusations that it would resort to suicide bombing to achieve Tibetan independence.

== See also ==
- Legal basis for autonomy within China
- List of organizations of Tibetans in exile
- Tibetan independence movement
- Tibetan sovereignty debate
- Tsewang Rigzin (President TYC 2008–2013)
