= Pargo =

Pargo may refer to:

- Pargo Kaling, in Lhasa, Tibet
- Jannero Pargo (born 1979), American basketball coach and former player
- Jeremy Pargo (born 1986), American basketball player
- A fish also known as the red snapper
- USS Pargo, the name of several United States Navy ships
