= Tree of physiology =

Tibetan thangka

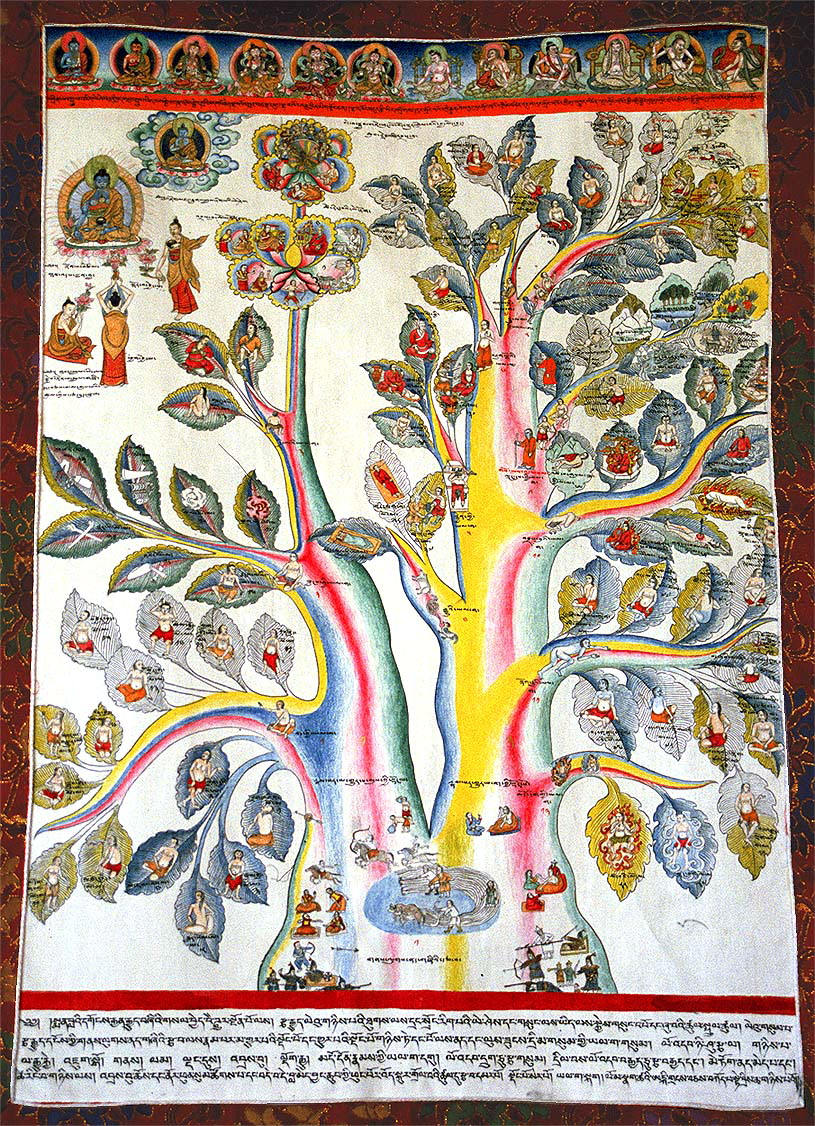
Tree of physiology - Tibetan thangka, upper panel shows the lineage of medical teachers from Buddha to the hermit sages

The tree of physiology is a Tibetan thangka depicting human physiology and certain pathological transformations.

== Epistemology ==
Tibetan medicine had developed a rather sophisticated knowledge of anatomy and physiology, which was acquired from their long-standing experience with human dissection. Tibetans out of necessity, had long ago adopted the practice of celestial burial (also Sky burial) because of Tibet's harsh terrain in most of the year and deficit of wood for cremation. This form of Sky burial, still practiced, begins with a ritual dissection of the deceased, and then followed by the feeding of the parts to vultures on the hill tops. Both the location of the ritual dissection and the place of feeding is understood as the charnel ground. Over time, anatomical knowledge found its way into Ayurveda and to a lesser extent into China. As a result, Tibet has become a home of the Buddhist medical centers Chogppori and Menchikhang (or Menhang), between the twelfth to sixteenth century A.D., where monks came to study even from foreign countries.

== Fisher donation ==
Emily Fisher, a trustee at The American Museum of Natural History, donated modern copies of a series of seventy-nine Tibetan Buddhist tangkas (religious paintings) that were originally commissioned in 1687 by the fifth Dalai Lama's regent, Sangye Gyamtso (1653-1705). He had the paintings done to elucidate his commentary on the "Four Tantras" (Tib. Gyushi) - eighth-century Tantric Buddhist texts that form the foundation of Tibetan medicine and cover physiology, pathology, diagnosis, and cure. With such depictions, the Tantric Buddhist system of healing could, according to Sangye Gyamtso, be "perceived by everybody, from the scholar to the child, as dearly as one would see a myrobalan (the foremost healing plant in the Tibetan tradition) held in the palm of one's hand."

== Art history ==
The original set of these thangkas, which were kept in Lhasa, were destroyed by the Chinese military in 1959, but these recent copies, based on three surviving sets, were painted over the course of seven years by Nepalese atelier Romio Shrestha, who followed religious and artistic conventions in copying the seventeenth-century originals. Shrestha's paintings on cloth, which are filled with astonishing renditions of a variety of physical conditions and illnesses, have been digitally photographed and incorporated into the Museum of Natural History, Division of Anthropology's image database.

== See also ==
- Ayurveda
- Eliot Tokar
- Sangye Gyamtso
- Tibetan art
- Traditional Chinese medicine
- Traditional Mongolian medicine
- Traditional Tibetan medicine
