= Men-Tsee-Khang =

Charitable institution based in India

Tibetan Medical & Astro. Institute, Institute of HH the 14th Dalai Lama
- Men-Tsee-Khang
- Motto: To heal and prevent morbidity
- Type: Charitable institution
- Established: 1916
- Director: Thubten Tsering (16th)
- Academic staff: 179
- Location: Dharamshala, Himachal, India; 32.222°N 76.3172°E
- Website: www.mentseekhang.org
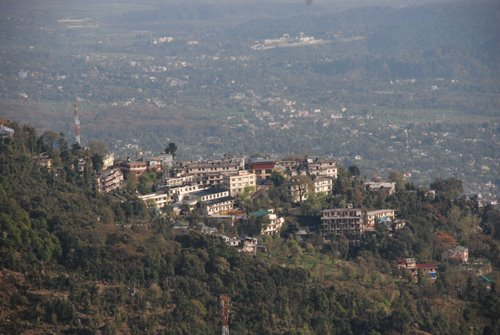

The Tibetan Men-Tsee-Khang (Tibetan: བོད་ཀྱི་སྨན་རྩིས་ཁང་།, romanized: Bod kyi sman rtsis khang), institutes were founded in 1916 by the 13th Dalai Lama with one in Lhasa, the Mentsi Dropen Ling, and another at the Chagpori College of Medicine of 1696. The Chagpori institute was bombarded in 1959 in the Lhasa uprising during which the 14th Dalai Lama fled to India, and re-established the Men-Tsee-Khang in 1961 as a charitable medical institution headquartered in Dharamshala, Himachal Pradesh, India to serve the Tibetan diaspora and preserve Tibetan medicine. It is also known as Tibetan Medical & Astro Institute.

The current Men-Tsee-Khang institute and its branches share the following mission statements:

- To preserve, promote and practice Sowa Rigpa and the ancient systems of Tibetan Medicine, Tibetan Astronomy and Astrology
- To improve the health and sanitation of Tibetan refugees and people in general
- To provide health care and social service through dispensaries for people regardless of "caste, colour or creed"
- To promote education and higher studies in the fields of Tibetan medicine and astrology
- To collaborate with scholars and institutions of different medical traditions in India and internationally
- To produce Tibetan medicines in environmentally sustainable and sensitive ways

The Dharamsala Men-Tsee-Khang institute opened on 23 March 1961 on two separate campuses with Ven Dr. Yeshi Dhonden as the doctor and teacher of the Medicine Department, and with Ven Dukhorwa Lodoe Gyatso as the astrologer of the Astrology Department. In 1967 the campuses were merged into a central campus at Mcleod Ganj. As of 2022, the institute in India has 58 branch clinics, two medical colleges, and three wellness centers.

== History ==
In 1916, the 13th Dalai Lama halted plans to build an English school and repurposed the project as a larger medical, astronomy, and astrology institute for the training of monks, with one institution in Lhasa at Luguk and another at the Chagpori College of Medicine. The Lhasa institute was called the Mentsi Dropen Ling, and both institutes became known as Men-Tsee-Khang, while the Chagpori College of Medicine was also known of as Chagpori.

Khyenrab Norbu (1883-1962), a graduate of Chagpori, was appointed as Dean of both institutes by the Dalai Lama, and Tekhang Jampa Tubwang (nd-1922) was appointed as President. Khyenrab Norbu grew into a highly respected doctor and able astrologer whose forecasts were accurate, and was appointed as the Dalai Lama's Junior Physician in 1918. Students from Tibet, Bhutan, Lahaul, Ladakh, and Spiti came to study Sowa Rigpa, Tibetan medicine and its altruistic practices under his direction at both institutes. Students studied from the Tibetan medical treatises entitled the Four Tantras (rgyud bzhi), and the Blue Beryl (bai DUrya sngon po) as Khyenrab Norbu himself had also studied from its Supplement (man ngag yon tan rgyud kyi lhan thabs), and from the Instructions of the Forefathers (mes po'i zhal lung). The students attended his lectures and worked at the free medical camps, took field trips to collect medicinal plants and minerals, and served as doctors or amchis when needed before and after graduation. By 1945 at least 300 physicians were trained by Khyenrab Norbu at the institutes.

Khyenrab Norbu restored 79 of Kalon Sangye Gyatso's (1653-1705) illustrated medical thankas preserved at the institute in Lhasa, and commissioned more anatomical and laboratory charts for the institutes. By 1955, he created a program for a medical shelter for homeless Tibetans, the Trangkhang, that was sponsored by the Tibetan government and operated from the institutes as were mobile medical services staffed by physicians and trainees that provided medical care in Lhasa.

In March 1959 during the Lhasa uprising, the Chagpori College of Medicine was bombarded by the Chinese army, and its destruction prevented the future training of medical personnel at Chagpori, and halted the supply of free medical camps and services to Tibetans. The Lhasa Men-Tsee-Khong survived China's invasion of Lhasa, and Khyenrab Norbu was offered the position of president of the Men-Tsee-Khang. He accepted and continued working and giving his altruistic medical services until he was accused of being anti-communist in October of 1962. He lectured his students on the importance of the teacher and student relationship within their traditional studies, and then he died the next day from unknown causes on 28 October.

The 14th Dalai Lama soon after escaping Tibet and arriving in India re-established the Men-Tsee-Khang institution in Dharamsala, Himachal Pradesh, India, for the health of the arriving Tibetan refugees and to protect the legacy of Sowa Rigpa, Tibetan medicine. On 23 March 1961, the institute reopened on two campuses - Chopra House and Gleenmore Cottage - with a doctor, an astrologer, and ten students. Dr. Yeshi Dhonden headed the Medical School and Ven. Dukhorwa Lodoe Gyatso was in charge of the Astrology School. In 1967 as the institute grew, the campuses were joined into one site at Mcleod Ganj, then grew again and returned to Dharamsala in 1982.

The government of India recognized Sowa Rigpa in 2010 as an authentic healing tradition, and the Men-Tsee-Khang institute has grown by 2022 to include 58 branch clinics, two medical colleges, and three wellness centers located all around the country of India.

== Management ==
The institute is managed under two departmental categories: the Administrative Department and the Cultural Department or the Sowa Rigpa.

=== Administrative Department ===
The Head Office of Men-Tsee-Khang involves two main offices: Director and Registrar, The director heads the institution in a decentralized and democratic manner, not only to preserve the centuries-old discipline but also to provide health service worldwide. The registrar holds the responsibility of assuring that each cell of the institution meets the rules and regulations of the Indian Government.

The Branch Clinic Office was set up to administer the overall management and efficiency of the branch clinics. Under this office there are fifty-three branch clinics, mainly in India. These branch clinics shoulder the mainstream responsibility of rendering health-care services to all, irrespective of caste, race, gender. These clinics in a small town usually consist of one doctor, one nurse and one dispenser, and while these in a metropolitan city consist of two doctors, one nurse, two dispersers, a receptionist, and other blue-collar staff.

== Sowa Rigpa departments ==
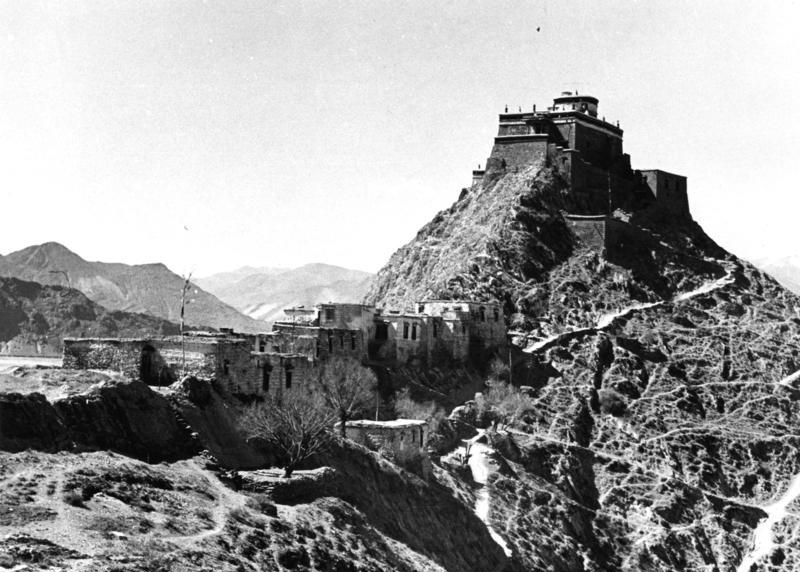
1938 photo of now destroyed Men-Tsee-Khang on top of Chagpori (English translation is "Iron Hill"), taken from the "Western Gate" or Pargo Kaling. Both Men-Tsee-Kang and Pargo Kaling were destroyed in the 1959 Tibetan uprising during which the 14th Dalai Lama escaped to India

- Tibetan Medical & Astro Institute was re-established on 23 March 1961 in Himachal Pradesh, India, under the direction of His Holiness the 14th Dalai Lama. This Sowa Rigpa institute trains Tibetan doctors and astrologers for five years in Traditional Tibetan medicine, and subsequently sends them to the nearly 60 branch clinics of Men-Tsee-Khang across India for one year internships. Students are selected through an entrance examination. At present there are 25 seats for graders, 2 seats for dependents, one seat for foreigners and one seat for Himalayans. 243 Tibetan doctors and 47 Tibetan astrologers are graduates of the college, and they all have received a Kachupa (Bachelor's) Degree.
- The Astrology Department was initially set up in 1960 and was an independent institute until 1967. The astrology department uses the traditional "Phugluk" method of calculation to produce a range of annual almanacs, calendars, amulets and horoscopes in both Tibetan and English. This department serves various organisations in making calculation that are required before initializing important human activities. Tibetan Astrological readings include a birth (horoscope) reading, marriage compatibility reading, individual obstacle reading, medical reading, daily favorability reading, medical preparatory planning reading, and death reading, in both Tibetan and English. The department also entertain guests, journalists, and other interested people to spread awareness to Tibetan astrology and to preserve, promote and develop this rich culture.
- The Materia Medica undertakes research on the identification of medicinal herbs, especially those herbs which still remain unidentified or misidentified. The research is carried out by comparing reliable sources and seeking advice from eminent Tibetan doctors living both outside and inside Tibet. The department also comparatively studies both Tibetan medicinal and Ayurvedic herbs and publishes books covering the various names, pictures, habitats, and efficacy of the herbs. The department's work is based on the drawings in the eighty-eight medical scrolls of Desi Sangye Gyatso.
- The Documentation and Publication Department was established in 1995. The department has been renamed three times: Editorial and Publication Department; Sorig Literary Department; and Mentsee Literary Research Department. The department shoulders the responsibility of compiling and collecting various works of the great Tibetan scholars, especially those works which are scarce and rare. The department also conducts research on Tibetan medicine and astrology, and periodically publishes a journal in Tibetan and English. The department launched a new Tibetan web-site called www.mentsee.org on the golden jubilee celebration of Men-Tsee-Khang, to heighten awareness of Tibetan medical and astrological knowledge.

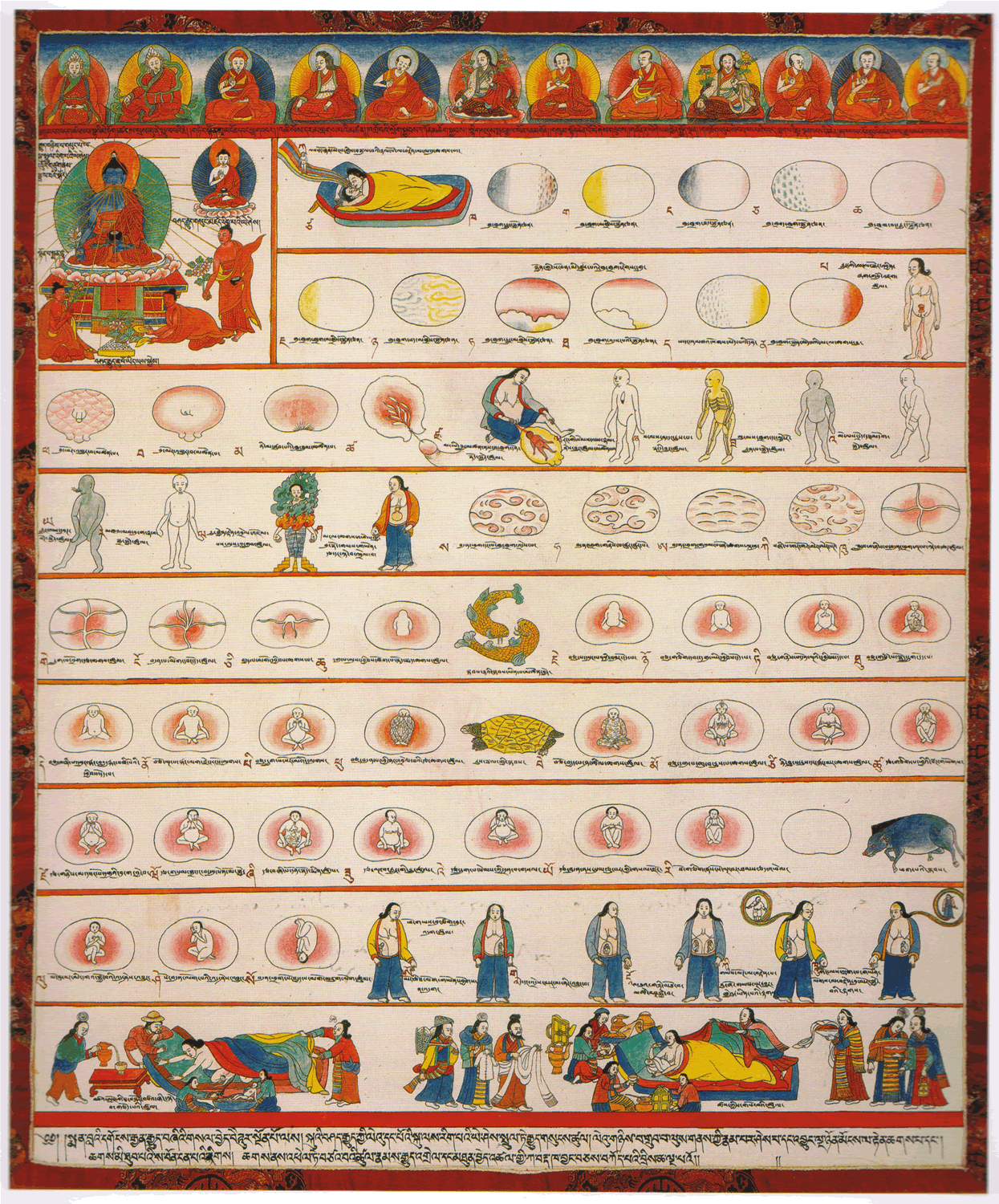
Illustration (Conception to Birth) from the "Blue Beryl" or "Ornament to the Mind of Medicine Buddha- Blue Beryl Lamp Illuminating Four Tantras", written around the year 1720 by Sangye Gyatso (1653–1705), the regent of the 5th Dalai Lama (1617–1682) who founded the School of Men-Tsee-Khang on Chagpori (Iron Mountain) in 1696

- The Herbal Products Research Department was established in the year of 1982 and became an independent department in 1991. The department manufactures nearly forty varieties of health-care products, mainly based on traditional formulations of Tibetan medicine, following the international rules and regulation of good manufacturing practice (GMP). These products include Hair Oil, Ointment, Incense, Anti-Wrinkle Creams, Massage Oil and Ioong Tea, to name a few. All the products are branded as Sorig. The department employs two doctors and around twenty workers. The main aim and objective of this department is to preserve the knowledge of healthcare and beauty remedies for the benefit of mankind, and also to raise awareness on the value of natural herbs.
- The Research & Development Department was initially established in 1980 under the name of 'Research and Development'. Since 1994 it has conducted research on specific diseases. In 1999, the name of the department was changed to Clinical Research Department. On the basis of unique diagnostic thods and features of Tibetan medicine, this department coins new terms for diseases in Tibetan, does research in producing new medicines and documents evidence-based practice. Clinical studies are done by incorporating modern legal scientific methods on diseases with allopathic medicine. Since 1988, this department has done clinical research on hypertension, diabetes, Hepatitis B, and conducted a hypertension survey and a pilot study on peptic ulcer and gastritis. The clinical trials on diabetes, arthritis, Hepatitis B, and tshothal studies have proved great success. As a contribution to public health, the department has published books on dietary regimes and is presently using the various media platforms to educate the common people about health, disease prevention, dietary and lifestyle management.
- The Pharmaceutical Department was established in 1961 and entrusted to manufacture medicines through the seven sub-process of collection of raw materials, cleaning, formulation, pulverizing, pill coating, and medicine counting. This department was recognized as a standard pharmaceutical center in the year of 2010 by the Central Council of Tibetan Medicine. The department manufactures 172 types of medicine, mainly in the forms of pills and powders: The formulae of 37 medicines are derived from the Gyu shi known as the Four Tantras ancient medical textbook; 107 from the practical instructions of various scholars; and 35 from a combination of both Gyu shi and personal instructions. All the medicines are distributed to the branch clinics of Men-Tsee-Khang as required.
- The Body, Mind and Life Department was established in 2013. The primary objective of this department is to promote mental healthcare services through the assimilation of traditional and modern knowledge primarily based on Buddhist psychiatry, in conjunction with the principles of physical and mental healthcare system mentioned in the Traditional Tibetan Medicine and Astrology system.

== See also ==
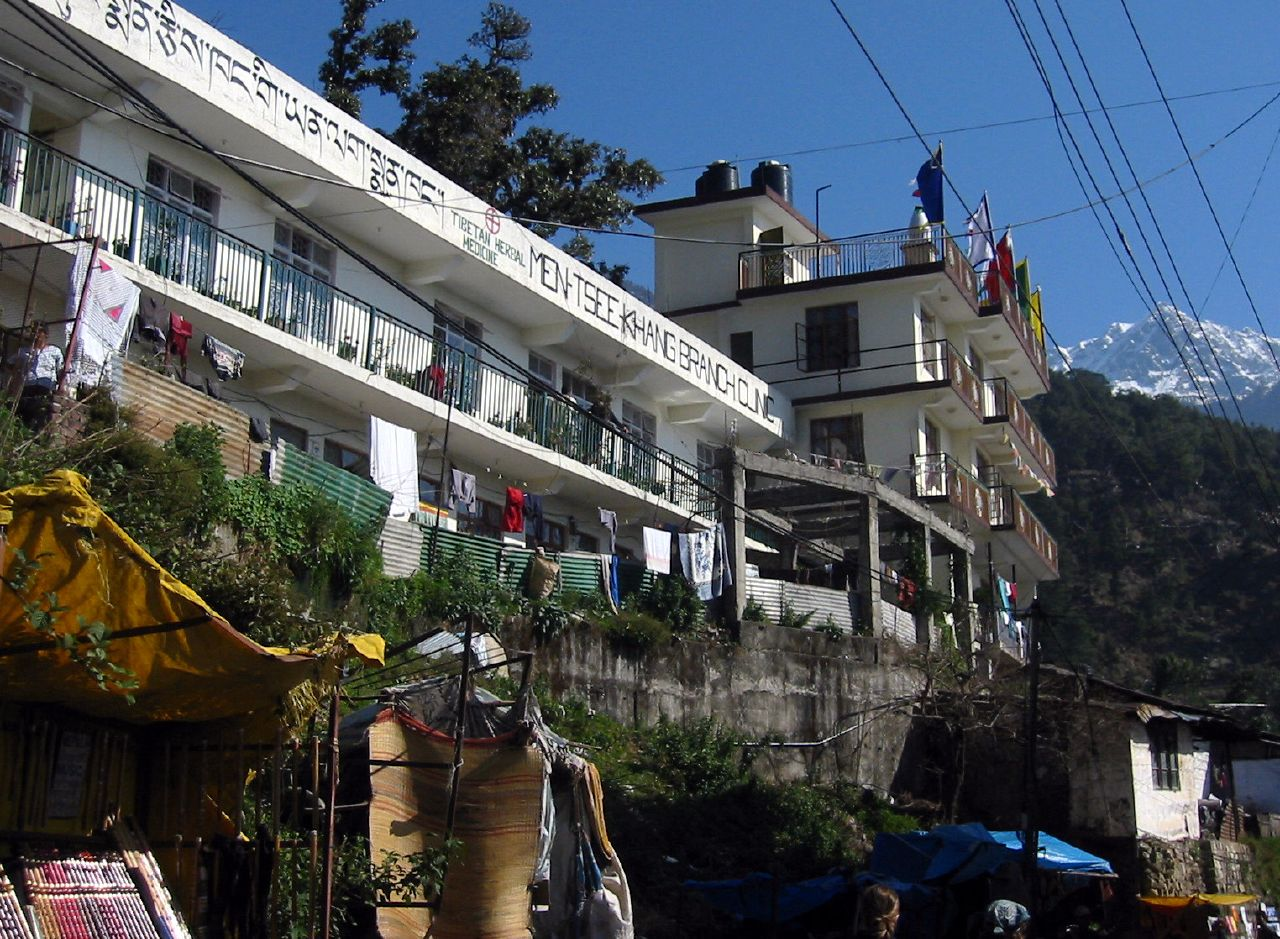
Tibetan Medical and Astrological Institute, Gangchen Kyishong in McLeod Ganj, India, 2005

- Traditional Tibetan Medicine
- Tibetan Astrology
- Lobsang Dolma Khangkar
