= Tsewang Dolkar Khangkar =

Doctor of traditional Tibetan medicine

Tsewang Dolkar Khangkar (born 1959 in Kyirong, Tibet) is a doctor of traditional Tibetan medicine, currently exiled in India.

== Early life ==
She was born in Kyirong, southern Tibet, and about 2 years after 1959 Tibetan uprising, she went into exile in India through Nepal with her mother, a dangerous crossing of the Himalayas during which her two elder brothers died.

== Studies ==
She studied pulse reading, urine analysis, medicinal plants and minerals used in Traditional Tibetan medicine, pharmacology and Tibetan astrology.

Between 1972 and 1978, she studied Tibetan medicine at the Tibetan Medical and Astrology in Dharamshala. From 1978 until 1981, she completed her studies under the guidance of her mother, the famous Dr. Lobsang Dolma Khangkar.

== Practice ==
She runs a clinic (Dolkar Herbal Medicine Clinic) in Kalkaji, south of New Delhi since 1981, and treats patients in Mumbai and Hyderabad.

She has written several books on Tibetan medicine. She is considered a specialist of cancer.

== Family ==
The daughter of Lobsang Dolma Khangkar, she married in 1977 with the Tibetan intellectual K. Dhondup with whom she had three daughters, two of whom are still living.

== Publication ==
- (in English) Health and harmony through the balance pulse rhythms: the diagnostic art my mother taught me, with Lobsang Dolma Khangkar, Yarlung Publications, 1990
- (in English) Journey into the mystery of Tibetan medicine: based on the lectures of Dr. Dolma, Livre 1, avec Lobsang Dolma Khangkar, Yarlung Publications, 1990
- (in French) Médecin du toit du monde, with Marie-José Lamothe, Editions du Rocher, 1997, ISBN 2268024911
- (in French) La méthode bouddhiste de guérison, Guy Trédaniel, 1999, ISBN 2-84445-054-7

== Bibliography ==
- Dolma & Dolkar: mother and daughter of Tibetan medicine, Tashi Tsering Josayma, K. Dhondup, Yarlung Publications, 1990, ISBN 8171970001
