= Bachelor of Sowa Rigpa Medicine and Surgery =

Bachelor of Sowa Rigpa Medicine and Surgery (BSRMS) (India) is an education pursued after 10+2 and clearing the National Eligibility cum Entrance Test (NEET) conducted by National Commission for Indian System of Medicine for a medical and surgical career in Sowa Rigpa Medicine. University Grants Commission in India has granted recognition to the bachelor's degree program in Sowa Rigpa Medicine and Surgery (BSRMS) with minimum of five years duration making it open for any university or institution to offer the course after meeting the pre-requisites.

== Background ==
Sowa Rigpa Medicine and Surgery (BSRMS) is a traditional and indigenous Tibetan system with combination of Ayurveda, Chinese and Greek medicines. The medicine which is traditional and popular has been granted recognition by University Grants Commission.

== Eligibility ==
Bachelor of Sowa Rigpa Medicine and Surgery (BSRMS) in India can be pursued by anyone who has the following qualifications:

- Is a pass out of class 12th Board exams having subjects biology, physics and chemistry with 50 percent aggregate from a recognised university or Institution, and
- Is qualified by National Eligibility cum Entrance Test conducted by National Commission for Indian System of Medicine.

== Curriculum ==
Bachelor of Sowa Rigpa Medicine and Surgery is designed as minimum five years degree and has the following curriculum:

- Medicine discourse procedure
- Dynamic equilibrium of mind and body
- Healthy and diseased body disequilibriums
- Disorders diagnosis with symptoms
- Various methods of therapy
- Disorders causes
- Diseases cause
- Causes of diseases in body
- Diseases symptoms and the disorders classification
- Modern Biology with an emphasis on cells and tissues
- Organisation of body
- Body systems and homeostasis
- Integration of body parts and its regulation
- Disease and disorder reproduction, heredity and development.

== Institutions ==
Bachelor of Sowa Rigpa Medicine and Surgery (BSRMS) is offered as a six-year course named ‘Menpa Kachupa in below institutions:

- Central Institute of Buddhist Studies (Leh).
- Tibetan Medical and Astrological Institute by Dalai Lama (Dharamshala)
- Central University for Tibetan Studies (Uttar Pradesh), and
- Chagpori Medical Institute (Darjeeling).
- Sowa Rigpa Educational Institute at Namgyal Institute of Tibetology at Deorali.

== Career ==
Bachelor of Sowa Rigpa Medicine and Surgery (BSRMS) can start their own practice after completion of their education and currently around 1000 practitioners reside near Himalayas with main base around Ladakh and Dharmashala as per Government of India records. They are also situated in the states of Sikkim, Arunachal, Pradesh, and West Bengal (Darjeeling).

== See also ==
- Ayurveda
- Education in India
