= Vaidya Bhagwan Dash =

Indian author and scholar

- Born: 4 October 1934 (age 90); India

Philosophical work
- Main interests: Ayurveda Tibetan Medicine
- Notable works: Caraka Saṃhitā

Vaidya Bhagwan Dash (4 October 1934 – 24 August 2015) was an Indian author and scholar in the field of Ayurvedic and Tibetan Medicine.

== Education ==
He graduated in Ayurvedic Medicine and Surgery from Orissa (1955) and further studies of "High Proficiency In Ayurveda" from the postgraduate training centre In Ayurveda, Jamnagar (1958). Further-wards he completed his B.A. from Tribhuvan University, Nepal (1969) then his M.A. (Sanskrit) at Delhi University (1973). His PhD was completed In Tibetan Medicine from Delhi University (1978)

== Career ==
He worked as an Ayurvedic practitioner and consultant In Ayurveda Rasashala clinic, New Delhi and The Instituto Italiano Dl Ayurveda, Florence (Italy). Later he has also served for WHO and SEARO in New Delhi. He was a prolific author worked on 10's of books particularly translations from Sanskrit to English of medical texts. His most notable work was his 7 volume Caraka Samhita done with Ram Karan Sharma jointly.

Vaidya Dash maintained a private clinical practice in Delhi. He also worked as a bibliographer and cataloguer for the Library of Congress office in Delhi.
