= Chagpori =

Spirit-mountain in Tibet

Coordinates: 29°39′08″N 91°06′34″E

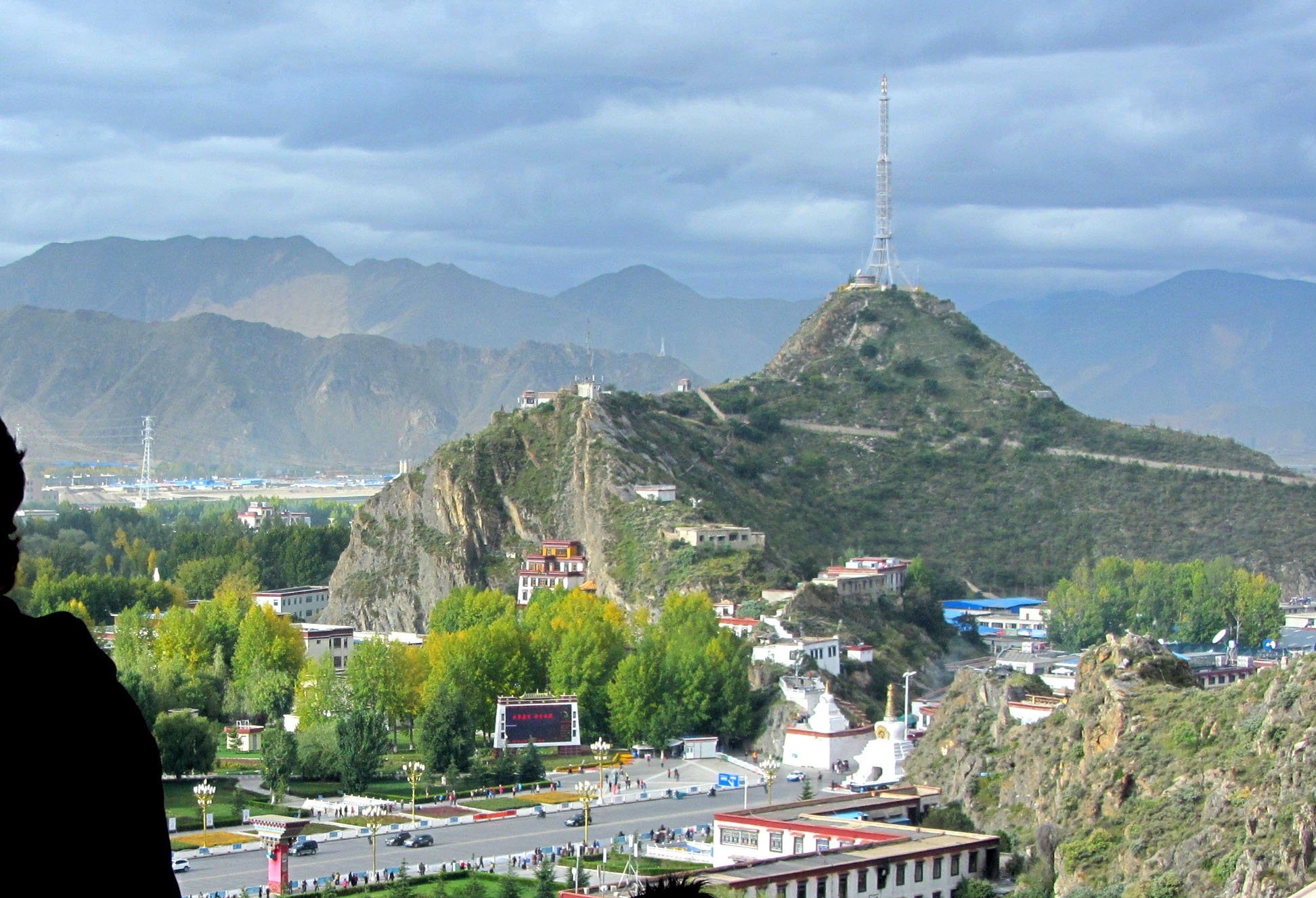
Chagpori seen from Potala (2013). The large antennae currently on top, replaced the destroyed Tibetan Medical and Astrological College called Men-Tsee-Khang

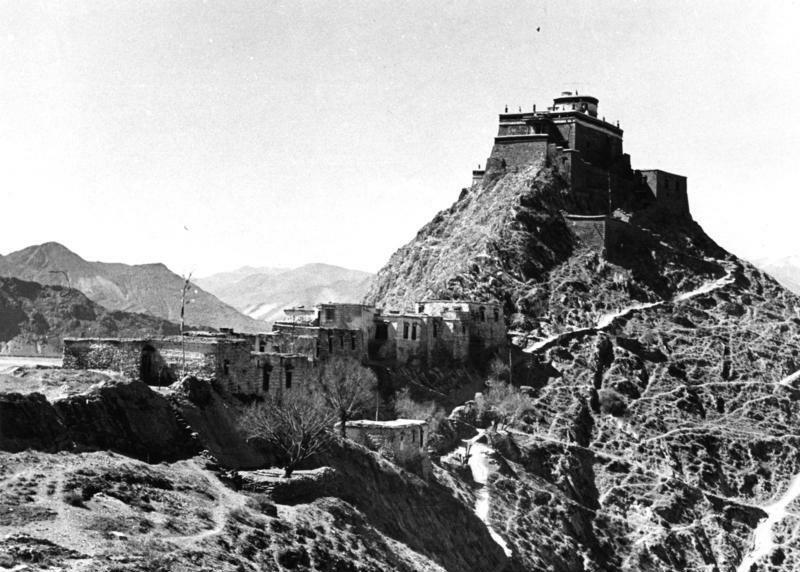
1938 photo of Chagpori College of Medicine and Men-Tsee-Khang on top of Chagpori, taken from the Western Gate or Pargo Kaling. It was completely destroyed during the Lhasa uprising.

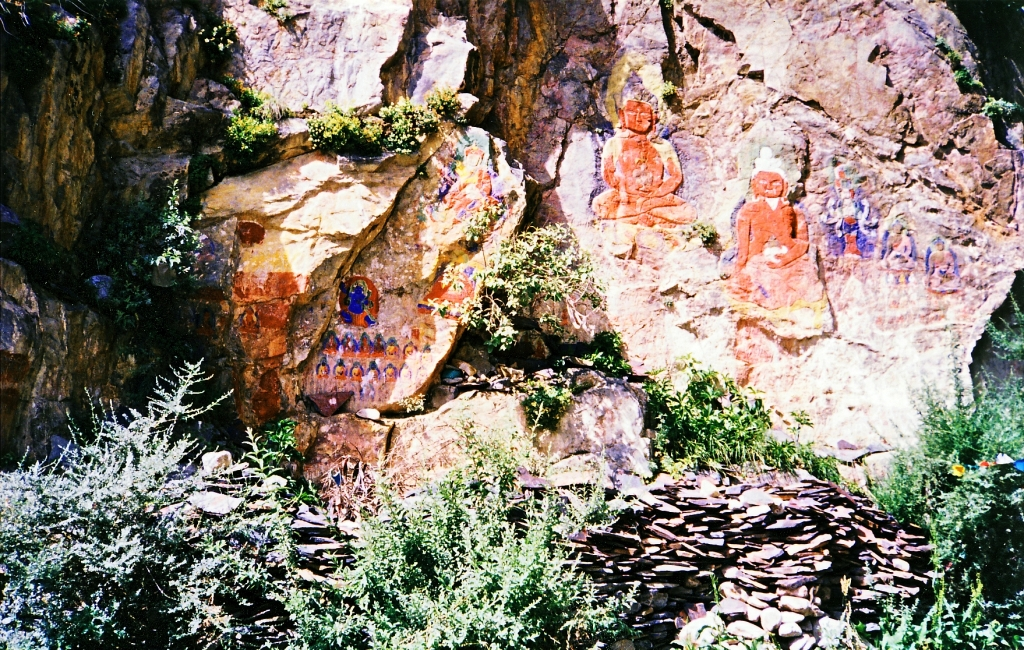
Painted rock carvings at the base of Chagpori, 1993

Chagpori, or Chakpori, Chokpori, Chagpo Ri (Wylie: lcags po ri, literally "Iron Mountain") is a spirit-mountain of Vajrapani in Lhasa, Tibet. It is south of Potala and is considered to be one of the four holy mountains of central Tibet. The Chagpori College of Medicine was built there in 1696, then destroyed by Chinese forces in 1959 and replaced by an antenna. Chagpori College of Medicine was rebuilt in Darjeeling, India in 1992.

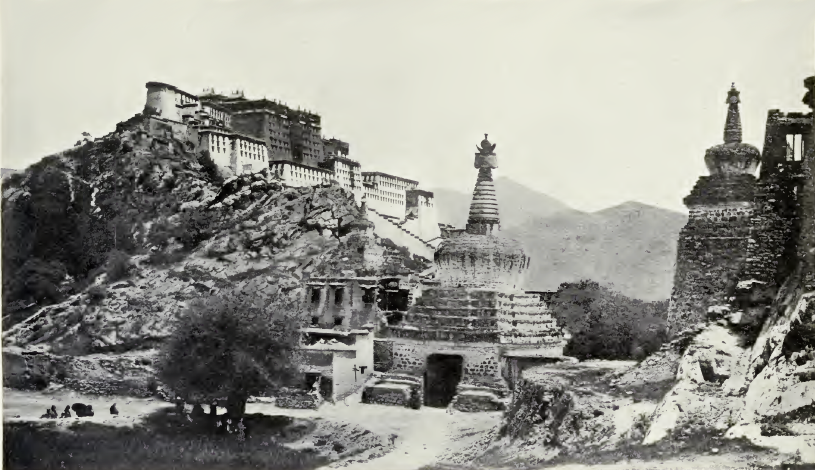
Western Gate (Pargo Kaling) to Lhasa located between Chagpori (right) and Potala (left). Photo by the British expedition to Tibet in 1904.

Chagpori was the site of the monastic medical college of the same name founded there by Sangye Gyatso in 1696. This medical college, which incorporated a recently restored temple made by Thang Tong Gyalpo, was supplied with revenue generating lands and with a constant stream of students by a "monk tax". It remained an important medical and astrological institution in Tibet and Central Asia up until 1959 and the Lhasa uprising. Peter Aufschnaiter was photographed by Heinrich Harrer on top of the College of Medicine and Astrological Institute, the Men-Tsee-Khang using a theodolite for surveying the city of Lhasa. Aufschnaiter wrote, "Since 23 December 1947 I have been staying in Lhasa for some months to make a town plan, and have now been appointed to the government service by a decree of the Regent."

During the March 1959 Lhasa uprising, the medical school first built by the 5th Dalai Lama, then re-established in by the 13th Dalai Lama in 1916 as the Men-Tsee-Khang together with a temple housing statutes of Tsepame in coral, of Tujechempo in mother of pearl, and of Green Tara (Drolma) in turquoise were demolished by the People's Liberation Army artillery, as the Tibetans had one cannon up there. Jianglin Li's book Tibet in Agony: Lhasa 1959 says,

"On March 20 (...) That was the morning of the shelling of Chakpori Hill. While the Tibetan Medical Institute crumbled..."

The monk Jampa Phuntsok of the Namgyal Monastery recalled,

"when the bombardment of Chakpori Hill began (...) the Tibetans at the Potala could only watch as their beloved landmark went up in smoke."

== Chagpori College of Medicine ==
Originally commissioned by the 5th Dalai Lama and built by his Kalon Sangye Gyatso in 1696, the Chagpori College taught Tibetan medical practices from the Four Tantras and other collected international systems as compiled at Samye Monastery in the 8th century. The Four Tantras treatise was re-edited in the 12th century, and used continually at Chagpori College of Medicine, and at the Men-Tsee-Khang which added the Astrological Institute in 1916 to the medical college, until the bombardment by China's invasion forces in 1959.

In 1992, a surviving doctor trained in the traditional Tibetan medical system, Venerable Dr. Trogawa Rinpoche, was able to establish the Chagpori Tibetan Medical Institute in Darjeeling, India, in commemoration of Chagpori, Tibet. The building program included the college, a pharmacy, and clinics, with a hostel to house its students. The CTMI has opened with the blessings of the 14th Dalai Lama, and is a recognized medical college through the Council of Tibetan Medicine in Dharmsala. At least eighty amchi (doctors) have since graduated, and around 15 students in 2020 were actively studying.

== Chagpori today ==
It is now crowned by radio antennas. A road has been constructed through the spur that used to connect Chagpori with the Marpori ('Red Hill') on which the Potala is built. At this spur connecting these two hills was the famous chorten Pargo Kaling, a spired reliquary with an arch that served as the town's western gate and was demolished in 1967 and rebuilt in 1995.

Some rebuilding has since taken place a number of old rock carvings have survived through damage. Some of them are thought to have been carved during the reign of king Songtsen Gampo (605 or 617? - 649 CE) and painted by Nepalese artists. Some buildings have been rebuilt near the base of the hill and there is now again a small temple with prayer wheels.

Tradition has it that the three main hills of Lhasa represent the "Three Protectors of Tibet." Chagpori is the soul-mountain (bla-ri) of Vajrapani, Pongwari that of Manjushri, and Marpori, the hill on which the Potala stands, represents Chenresig or Avalokiteshvara.

== Footnotes ==
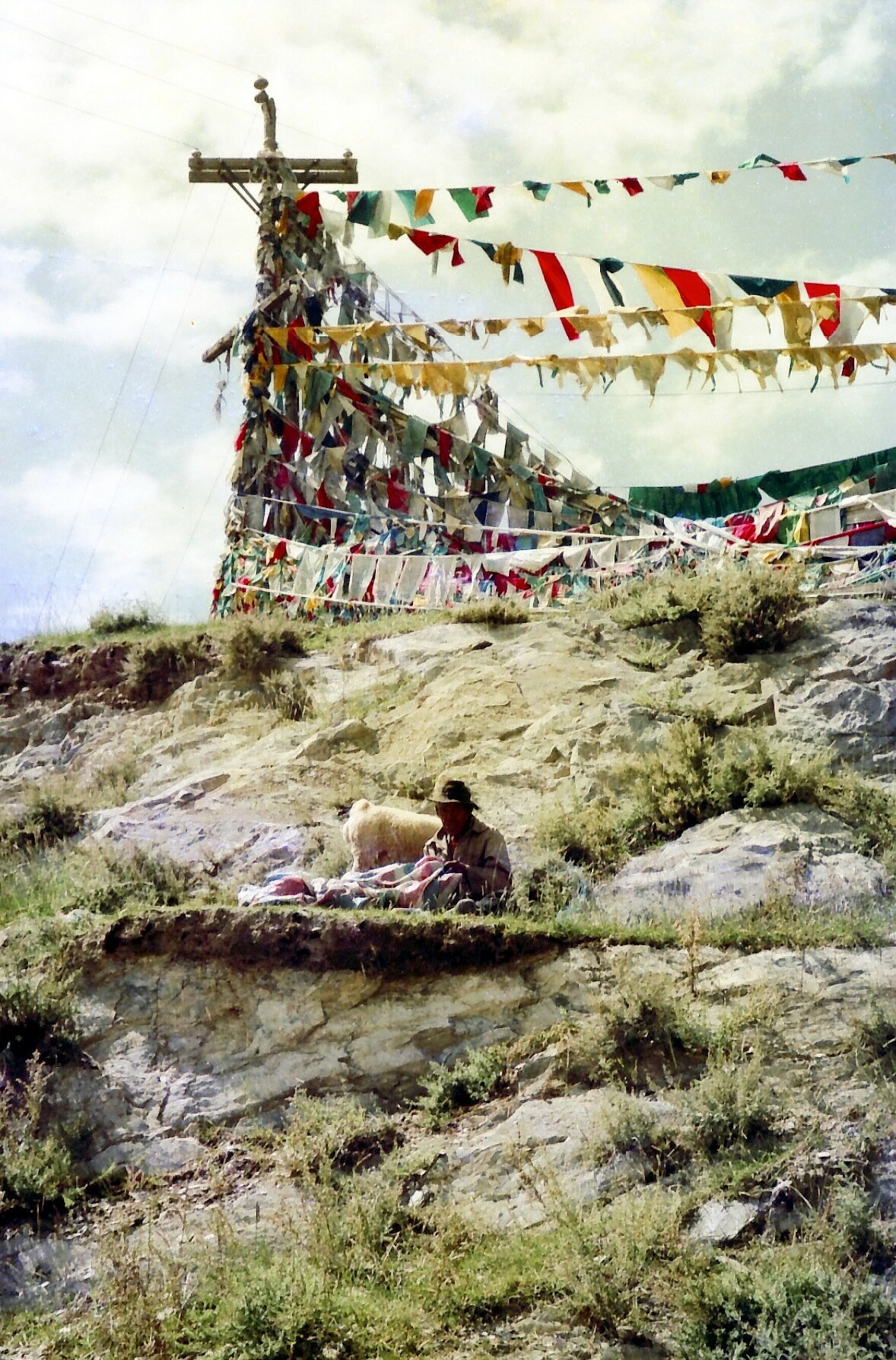
Flags over road between Potala and Chagpori. 1993.

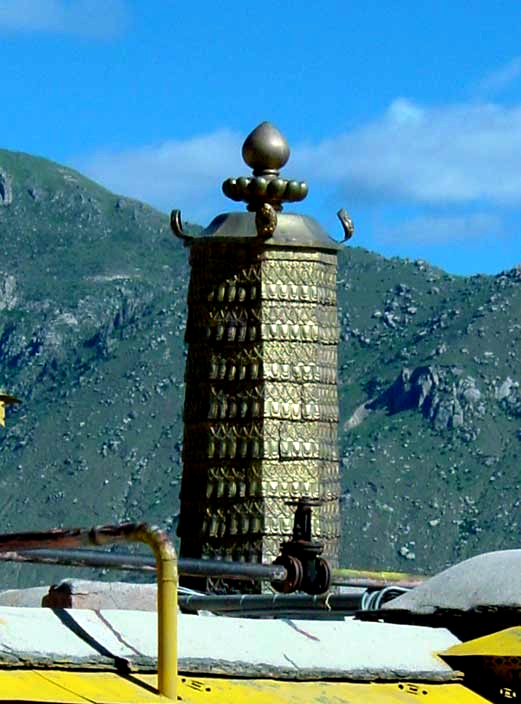
The Chakpori in the background as photographed from the Potala's roof

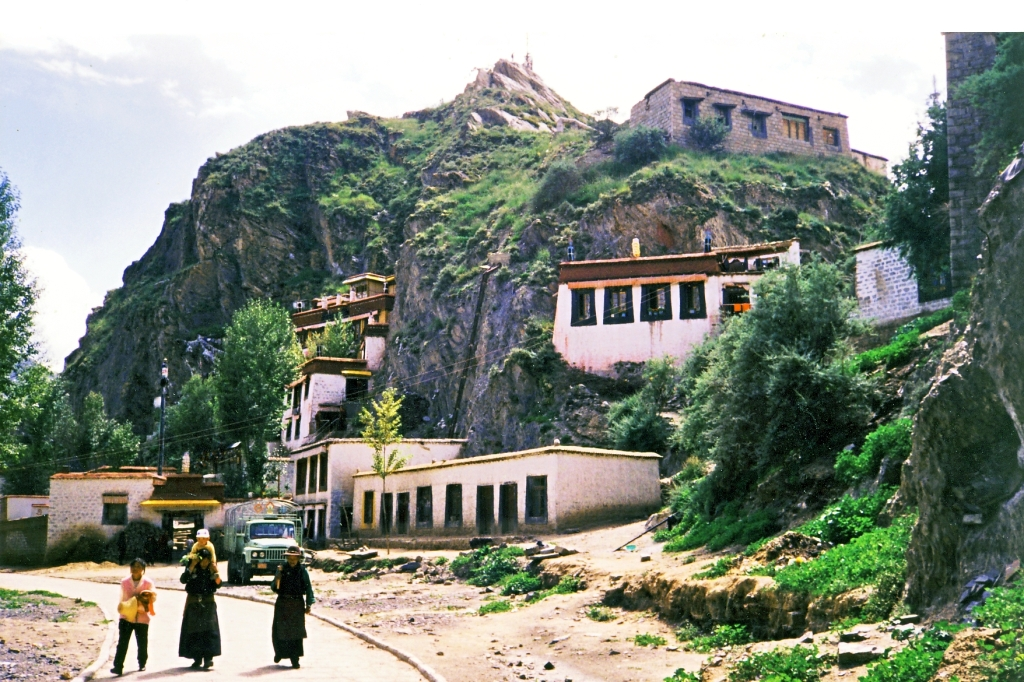
Below Chagpori 1993- note the hill has no Men-Tsee-Khang building on top (a medical college founded by the 13th Dalai Lama) and the radio antennae has not yet been built
