= Yeshi Dhonden =

Tibetan doctor (1927–2019)

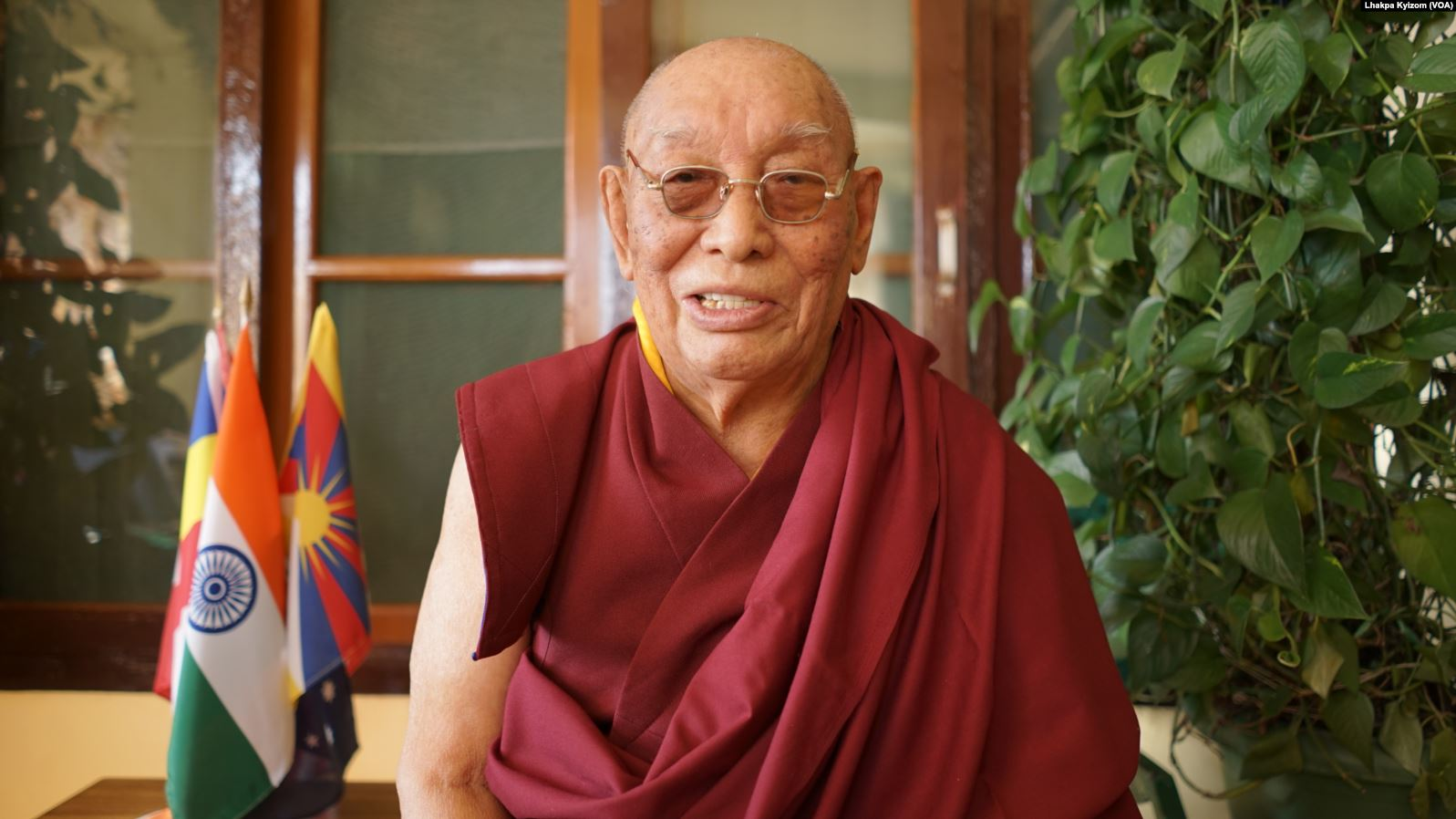
- Born: 15 May 1927; Namro, Tibet
- Died: 26 November 2019 (aged 92); McLeodganj, Himachal Pradesh, India
- Occupation: Doctor
- Years active: 1951–2019

Yeshi Dhonden (Tibetan: ཡེ་ཤེས་དོན་ལྡན, Wylie: ye shes don ldan; 15 May 1927 – 26 November 2019) was a Tibetan doctor of traditional Tibetan medicine, and served the 14th Dalai Lama from 1961 to 1980. In 2018, the Indian government honoured him with the Padma Shri, the fourth highest civilian award in India.

== Early life and education ==
Yeshi Dhonden was born into a family of peasants on 15 May 1927 in Namro, a village located in Lhoka, Tibet, south of the Yarlung Tsangpo River. He was sent to Sungrab Ling Monastery at the age of six and took novice vows as a Buddhist monk two years later. At eleven, he joined the Chakpori Institute of Tibetan Medicine, Lhasa, and studied medicine for nine years. He was taught by Khyenrab Norbu. Dhonden displayed strong memorization skills during the study of the four tantra.

At twenty he was recognized as the best in class at the Chakpori Institute of Tibetan Medicine, and was made an honorary doctor of the Dalai Lama. From 1951 onward, he practiced medicine in Tibet in his native region, where he became known for his great efficiency after he had treated an influenza epidemic on the Tibetan-Bhutanese border that year. When the 14th Dalai Lama went into exile in 1959, Dhonden chose to accompany him and help the Tibetan refugees in India.

== Career ==
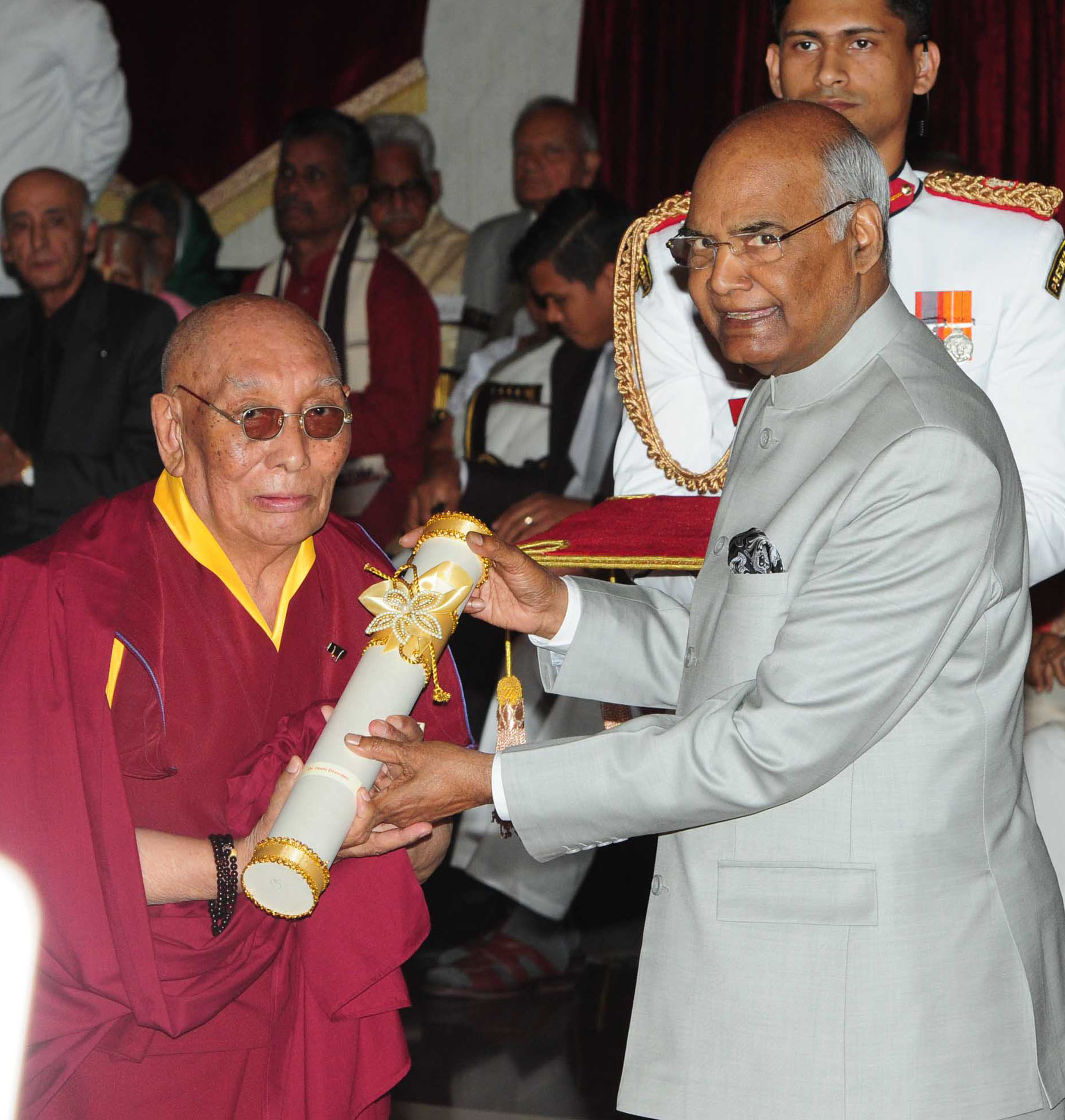
The President, Shri Ram Nath Kovind presenting the Padma Shri Award to Dr. Yeshi Dhonden, at the Civil Investiture Ceremony, at Rashtrapati Bhavan, in New Delhi on 20 March 2018.

In 1959, Yeshi Dhonden was one of the three Tibetan physicians, along with Lobsang Dolma Khangkar and Trogawa Rinpoche, to escape Tibet and was requested by the Dalai Lama to reinstall the Tibetan Institute of Medicine and Astrology in exile.

In Dharamshala, India, he refounded the Tibetan Institute of Medicine and Astrology in 1961 and served as its Director till 1966. He resigned from the Institute and established a private clinic in 1969. He traveled to the West to present lectures on Tibetan medicine. He was considered an icon on traditional Tibetan medicine and practices, and renowned for his contribution to cancer treatment. He was a foremost expert and proponent of Sowa Rigpa, which is a traditional Tibetan medicine system created as a combination of the ancient healing systems of India and China.

From 1960 to 1980, he was the personal physician of the Dalai Lama.

On 1 April 2019, he retired from medical practice due to declining health.

=== Books ===
Dhonden authored the following books:

- Health Through Balance: An Introduction to Tibetan Medicine (1986), co-authored with Jeffrey Hopkins, ISBN 978-0937938256
- Healing from the Source: The Science and Lore of Tibetan Medicine (2000), translated by B. Alan Wallace, ISBN 978-1559391481
- The Ambrosia of Heart Tantra (2006), translated by Jhampa Kelsang, ISBN 978-8185102924

== Awards ==
- 1987, Manrampa Chewa, Men-Tsee-Khang
- 2012, Yuthok Award, Central Council of Tibetan Medicine (Dharamsala)
- On 20 March 2018, the President of India, Ram Nath Kovind, conferred the Padma Sri of Medicine to Yeshi Dhonden at the Rashtrapati Bhavan.

== Death ==
Dhonden died on 26 November 2019 from respiratory failure in McLeod Ganj, Dharamshala, India.

== See also ==
- Eliot Tokar
