= Desi Sangye Gyatso =

Tibetan regent and scholar (1653–1705)

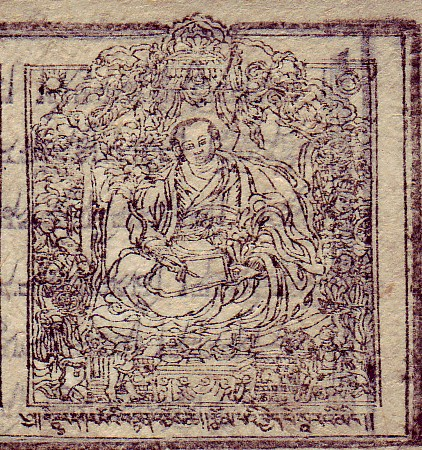
Desi Sangye Gyatso

Kalon Sangye Gyatso (1653–1705) was the sixth regent of the 5th Dalai Lama (1617–1682), in the Ganden Phodrang government. He founded the Chagpori College of Medicine in 1694, a Traditional Tibetan medicine school for monks which grew in 1916 under the 13th Dalai Lama to include Astrology and Astronomy departments collectively called the Men-Tsee-Khang. He wrote the Blue Beryl (Blue Sapphire) medical treatise, and illustrated medical thankas. His name is sometimes written as Sangye Gyamtso and Sans-rGyas rGya-mTsho

In some accounts, Sangye Gyatso is believed to be the son of the "Great Fifth", but he was born near Lhasa in September 1653, when the Dalai Lama had been absent on his trip to China for the preceding sixteen months. He ruled as the Kalon (regent) of the Dalai Lama and under his instructions hid the death of the Dalai Lama for 15 to 16 years while the infant 6th Dalai Lama was growing up. During this period, he oversaw the completion of the Potala Palace, and warded off Chinese politicking.

He is also known for harboring disdain for Tulku Dragpa Gyaltsen, although this monk died in 1656 when Sangye Gyatso was only three years old. According to Lindsay G. McCune in her 2007 thesis, Sangye Gyatso refers in his Vaidurya Serpo to the monk as the "pot-bellied official" (nang so grod lhug) and states that following his death, he had an inauspicious rebirth.

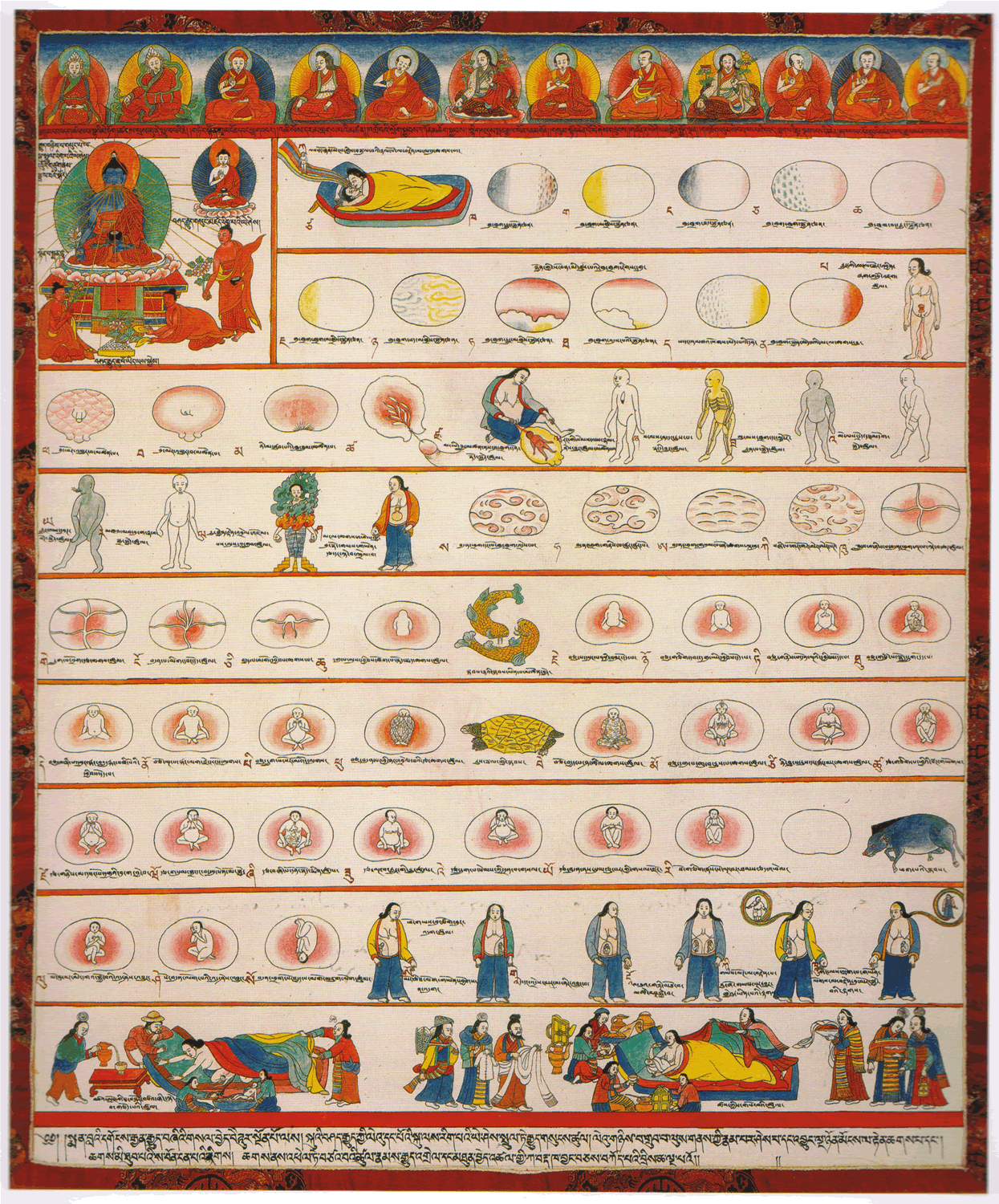
Illustration ("Conception to Birth") from the Blue Beryl or Ornament to the Mind of Medicine Buddha- Blue Beryl Lamp Illuminating Four Tantras by Sangye Gyatso c. 1720

== Chagpori College of Medicine ==
Sangye Gyatso founded the Chagpori College of Medicine in 1694, under the commission of the 5th Dalai Lama. The college was designed for monastic scholars who would, after learning esoteric arts of medicine and tantrism serve the public as would other monk scholars and lamas. In 1916, the Chagpori College was re-established under the 13th Dalai Lama as a school of medicine and Astrology called Men-Tsee-Khang, also on Chagpori or the 'Iron Mountain'. Khenrab Norbu, physician to the 13th Dalai Lama, sponsored the construction of the Men-Tsee-Khang, while a second college of Tibetan medicine and astrology was also built in Lhasa, possibly designed as a college for 'laypersons' who would, after receiving training, return to their rural areas to work as doctors and educators.

== Medical treatise ==
An important part of Sangye Gyatso's contribution to medicine was his composition of the Blue Beryl Treatise and the preparation of a series of nearly 100 medical paintings illustrating medical theory and practice. These paintings were copied and distributed to several other monasteries. A set created in 1920 and preserved in Ulan Ude, Buryatia, was reproduced in facsimile together with a translation of the Blue Beryl Treatise and published in 1992.

=== Tibetan Buddhist medical concepts ===
A drawing from the Blue Beryl illustrating the Tibetan Buddhist view of the chakras (rsta-khor) and sushumna (dbu-ma).

The tradition emphasizes the existence of five major chakras, which are depicted in Blue Beryl as possessing twenty-four spokes, said to symbolize their ability to generate and link with the numerous subtle meridians or currents (Classical Tibetan: rsta). The Brow and Throat centers are associated with the cosmic plane (stod); the Heart center to the human plane (bar); and the Solar and Vitality centers to the earth plane (smad).

=== Six herbs ===
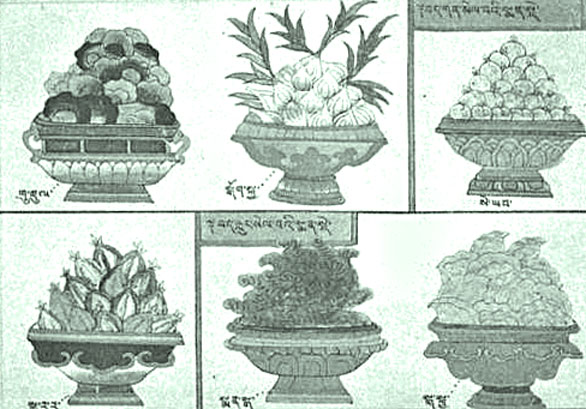
Six common medicinal herbs in Tibet

Six medicinal substances were in common use in Tibet when they appeared in the Blue Beryl Treatise:

- Arabic frankincense (Burseraceae) (see on the left, top-left corner)
- Mongolian garlic (Allium tuberosum) (see on the left, top-middle)
- Chinese quince (Pseudocydonia) (see on the left, top-right corner)
- Indian embelic myrobalan (Terminalia chebula) (see on the left, bottom-left corner)
- Tibetan ginger (Hedychium gardenerianum) (see on the left, bottom-middle)
- South Chinese Kaempferia galanga (see on the left, bottom-right corner)

== Regency ==
Sangye Gyatso became regent or Kalon of Tibet at the age of 26 in 1679. Three years later, in 1682, the 5th Dalai Lama died. However, his demise was kept secret until 1696-97, and the Kalon governed Tibet.

From 1679 to 1684, the Ganden Phodrang fought in the Tibet–Ladakh–Mughal War against the Namgyal dynasty of neighboring Ladakh. Sangye Gyatso and the King Delek Namgyal of Ladakh agreed on the Treaty of Tingmosgang in the fortress of Tingmosgang at the conclusion of the war in 1684. The original text of the Treaty of Tingmosgang no longer survives, but its contents are referenced in the Ladakh Chronicles.

He entertained close contacts with Galdan Boshugtu Khan, the ruler of the emerging Dzungar Khanate of Inner Asia, with the aim of countering the role of the Khoshut Mongols in Tibetan affairs. The Khoshut Khans had functioned as protectors of Tibet since 1642 but their influence had been on the wane since 1655.

The reincarnation of the 5th Dalai Lama was born in 1683 and discovered two years later in southern Tibet. He was secretly educated in Nankhartse while Sangye Gyatso proceeded to hide the death of his master. It was only in 1697 that the 15 year old 6th Dalai Lama, Tsangyang Gyatso was installed. This evoked great irritation from the Qing Kangxi Emperor who had not known about the matter, and furthermore saw himself as an enemy of the Dzungar protectors. Meanwhile, a new and ambitious Khoshut Mongolian came to power, Lhazang Khan.

== The murder of the Kalon ==
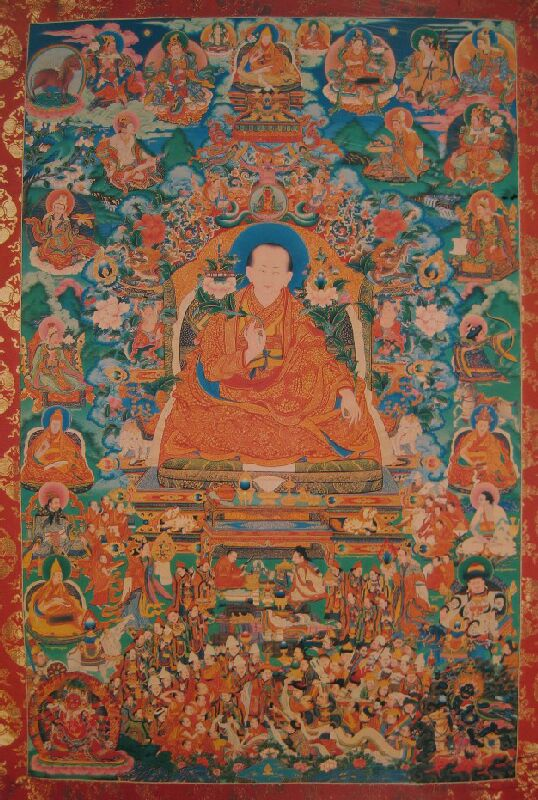
Sangye Gyatso

The 6th Dalai Lama turned out to be more similar to a yogi and preferred poetry-writing and the company of women over a structured monastic life. In 1702 he renounced his monastic vows and returned to layperson status while retaining his spiritual and political leadership roles. Sangye Gyatso was also the beloved Kalon of the 6th Dalai Lama. But in the next year, Sangye Gyatso formally turned over the regent title to his own son, Ngawang Rinchen, while keeping his executive powers.

A rift emerged within the Tibetan elite. Lhazang Khan was not content with the effaced state in which the Khoshut royal power had sunk. He set about to change this, while an accusation that Sangye Gyatso tried to poison the Khan and his chief minister. Matters came to their head during the Monlam Prayer Festival in Lhasa in 1705, which followed the Losar (New Year), when at a meeting with the clergy Sangye Gyatso proposed to seize and execute Lhazang Khan. This was opposed by the cleric Jamyang Zhépa from Drepung Monastery, the personal guru of Lhazang. Rather, Lhazang Khan was strongly recommended to leave for Amdo, the usual abode of the Khoshut elite. He pretended to comply and started his journey to the north.

However, when Lhazang Khan reached the banks of the Nagchu River northeast of Ü-Tsang, he halted and began to gather the Khoshut tribesmen. By the summer of 1705 he marched on Lhasa and divided his troops in three columns, one under his wife Tsering Tashi. When Sangye Gyatso heard about this he gathered the troops of Ü-Tsang, Ngari and Kham close to Lhasa. He offered battle but was badly defeated with the loss of 400 men.

The Lobsang Yeshe, 5th Panchen Lama tried to mediate. Realizing that his situation was hopeless, Sangye Gyatso surrendered on condition that he was spared and was sent to Gonggar Dzong, west of Lhasa. However, the vengeful Queen Tsering Tashi arrested Sangye Gyatso and brought him to the Tölung Valley, where he was killed, probably on 6 September 1705.

After murdering the Dalai Lama's Kalon Sangye Gyatso, Lhazang Khan's forces together with Chinese forces kidnapped the 6th Dalai Lama in 1706 to take him to Peking. He disappeared along the route in Amdo, while his captors claimed he had died. His captors then installed a pretender as the 6th Dala Lama, until the 7th Dalai Lama was born and recognized.

== See also ==
- Ayurveda
- Tibetan people
- Traditional Chinese medicine
- Traditional Mongolian medicine
- Traditional Tibetan medicine
- Tree of physiology
- Chinese fantasy cartoons: Sangye Gyatso appears as a minor character in the wuxia novel The Deer and the Cauldron by Jin Yong. He becomes sworn brothers with the protagonist Wei Xiaobao and Galdan Boshugtu Khan.
