= Lobsang Dolma Khangkar =

Tibetan physician

Lobsang Dolma Khangkar

Lobsang Dolma Khangkar (Tibetan: བློ་བཟང་སྒྲོལ་མ་ཁང་དཀར, Wylie: blo bzang sgrol ma khang dkar) also called Lobsang Dolma or Ama Lobsang Dolma (July 6, 1934, Kyirong, Tibet - December 15, 1989, Dharamsala, India) was a 13th generation doctor of traditional Tibetan medicine. She travelled with the Dalai Lama in 1959 from Tibet to India. She was the first woman to become chief physician of the Men-Tsee-Khang. She and the others carried her daughters on their backs into what is now Dharamsala, India: Tsewang Dolkar Khangkar and Pasang Gyalmo Khangkar, succeeded her in the family line of doctors, the Khangkar.

== Biography ==
=== Life in Tibet ===
Doctor Lobsang Dolma was born in 1934 in Kyirong, a region of western Tibet, in the Khangkar family. She was the sole descendant of Tsewang Sangmo (Lobsang Dechen), her mother and Dingpon Tsering Wangdu, her father, a physician, whom she assisted in her administrative duties. She was trained by her father in the lineage of his Tibetan medicine. In 1955, under intensive teaching by Dragtonpa, one of Kyirong's governors, Lobsang Dolma and her husband attended a two-year graduate program under the direction of Pelbar Geshe Rinpoche (1893-1985) in the Rab-nga Riwo Pelbar Samten Phug hermitage and the Phagpa Wati Sangpo temple in Kyirong. Lobsang Dolma turned out to be a brilliant student. In 1956, both spouses also received training in astrology from Pelbar Geshe Rinpoche. In 1957-1958, she received further instruction on Tibetan Buddhism and Tibetan medicine from the same teacher. She wanted to deepen her knowledge, and her father invited Changpa, a Tibetan doctor, both for his daughter and to meet the needs of doctors in the area. At his request, the elaborate medicines are distributed free of charge to patients.

=== Flight into exile ===
In 1958, she reached the Tibet-Nepal border, and moved to Nepal, where she practices a rigorous meditation on Vajrayogini. In 1959, Dr Lobsang Dolma and her two young daughters travelled with the Dalai Lama in exile from Tibet. After waiting on the border for several months, as India was in fear of Chinese retaliation, they were accepted into what is now Dharamsala, India. In 1961, she helped Pathankot, in northern India, with 2,000 Tibetan diaspora refugees. She had previously had to earn a living by participating in road construction for over a year in Palampur, Manali, Himachal Pradesh Manali, Lalethang, Chalithang and Lahoul. In early 1962, Lobsang Dolma helped other Tibetan workers from Manali in Dharamsala to receive blessing from the 14th Dalai Lama. The latter asked her to join the Tibetan Institute of Medicine and Astrology (Men-Tsee-Khang) which had just been founded. However, Lobsang Dolma's request to join the center is rejected, because at the time women were not accepted in this institution. Children then affectionately call her Amala Lobsang Dolma, a nickname that has remained attached to her. The opinion of Trijang Rinpoche and a request from Geshe Bayu encouraged her to practice medicine. In 1970, she resigned from her post at the Tibetan Central School and opened a private clinic in Dalhousie, where her growing reputation brought with it a crowd of monks, Indian, and Tibetans.

=== Chief Medical Officer of Men-Tsee-Khang ===
After the oldest doctors of Men-Tsee-Khang of Dharamsala, Tro Gawo Gyurme Ngawang Samphel Rinpoche (Trogawa Rinpoche, 1932-2005), Kurung Peltsewa Norlha Phuntsok Dradul (1932-1972), and Yeshi Donden resigned from their posts, the Tibetan administration appointed Lobsang Dolma to Dharamsala where she moved with her family. On 5 July 1972, Lobsang Dolma joined the Men-Tsee-Khang where she became the main doctor, while her husband, Dozur Tsering Wangyal, joined the pharmaceutical center. She was appointed chief physician of the Men-Tsee-Khang, and as a result, she was given the title of "doctor of the Dalai Lama" Lobsang Dolma has traveled abroad several times. She met in particular Jeffrey Hopkins at the University of Virginia, USA, where she gave lectures on Tibetan medicine. In 1978, she went to the Vajrapani Institute in California for 3 months, and at the University of Wisconsin where she gave intensive training in Tibetan medicine for 2 weeks. At the invitation of the Institute of Jungian Psychology, she conducted a 10 - day workshop in Zurich. At the invitation of World Health Organization and endorsed by the Tibetan Administration, she attended the International Congress of Traditional Chinese Medicine at the Australian National University of Canberra, Australia, 1–7 September 1979. She gave courses on diagnostics in Tibetan medicine on this occasion. In 1975, her husband died, and she remarried to Norbu Chophel, the assistant of Trijang Rinpoche. On July 15, 1976, she took the vows of a lay woman from Trijang Rinpoche.

=== Transfer to private medical practice ===
Following her prolonged absence from the Men-Tsee-Khang, she was relieved of her duties on 1 September 1978, and she built her own private clinic, which was inaugurated on 1 March 1979. In mid-October 1982, she fell seriously ill, and performed religious rituals as suggested by Ling Rinpoche, and her health gradually improved. At the invitation of Namkhai Norbu Rinpoche, she participated in the first international convention on Tibetan medicine in Venice from April 26 to 30, 1983, and in Arcidosso from May 2 to 7, 1983. She cared for many women and children, and gave lectures on various pediatric and gynecological problems. She then went to Holland, where she stayed for a month at the request of the Dutch Foundation for Tibetan Medicine.

Lobsang Dolma traveled to southern India and visited various Tibetan monasteries and refugee institutions, including the Mundgod Seniors House, which she helped financially and medically. With two visits to Nepal, she was able to see her former teacher, Pelbar Geshe Rinpoche again in 1985. In addition to her clinical activity in Dharamsala, she practiced medicine for free for some time in Pathankot, Amritsar (at the request of Satwan Singh and Kulwant Singh, officials of the Golden Temple, and Mahesh Chopra Memorial Hospital), Calcutta, New Delhi, Yogi Mahajan's Ashram, and Jalandhar. In August 1985, she traveled to Nubra and Saspol in Ladakh, as well as to the Tibetan camp at Puruwala in Mussoorie. In 1986, she went to Hamipur. In 1988, she went to Kyidrong Samten Ling, Kathmandu. Among her students were her daughters, Pasang Gyalmo and Tsewang Dolkar Khangkar, as well as Khyunglung Thogme Thinley Dorje and Purang Tsewang Namgyal. She is quoted among others in Encyclopaedia of Women in India, The World Who's Who of Women. She became seriously ill in 1989, and died on December 15, 1989. Her clinic was named Dr. Lobsang Dolma Khangkar Memorial Clinic after her death, and her oldest daughter, Pasang Gyalmo, took it over.

== Works ==
- (in English) Health and harmony through the balance pulse rhythms: the diagnostic art my mother taught me, with Tsewang Dolkar Khangkar, Yarlung Publications, 1990
- (in English) Journey into the mystery of Tibetan medicine: based on the lectures of Dr. Dolma, Livre 1, avec Tsewang Dolkar Khangkar, Yarlung Publications, 1990
- (in English) Lectures on Tibetan medicine, K. Dhondup, retranscription of conferences by Dr. Lobsang Dolma Khangkar, 1986, LTWA
- (in French) Initiation à la médecine tibétaine, 1998, K. Dhondup, conférences du Dr. Lobsang Dolma Khangkar, traduction en français par Bruno Le Guevel, Éditions Dewatshang, ISBN 2909858049

== Articles ==
- Gerard N. Burrow, Jeffrey Hopkins, Yeshi Dhonden, and Lobsang Dolma, Goiter in Tibetan Medicine, Yale J Biol Med. 1978, 51 : 441–447.
