= Eliot Tokar =

American practitioner of Tibetan medicine

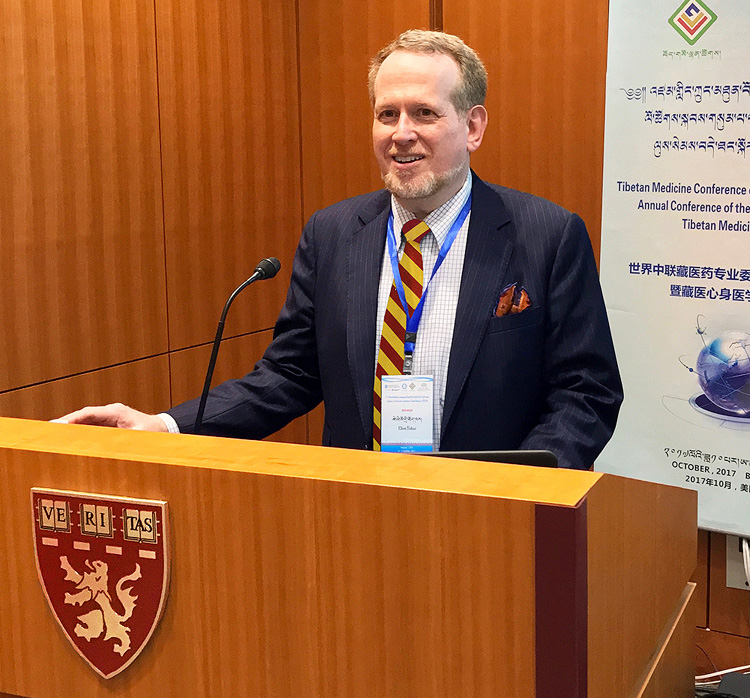
- Eliot Tokar presenting a paper at the 2017 Tibetan Medicine Conference on Mind-Body Health at Harvard Medical School, Boston, MA, USA.

Eliot Tokar is an American practitioner of Tibetan medicine, author, and lecturer. He lives and works in New York City.

As one of the few Westerners to have apprenticed with Tibetan physicians, Tokar studied with and received private instruction from Dr. Yeshi Dhonden, the former personal physician to Tenzin Gyatso, the 14th Dalai Lama of Tibet, from 1983 to 1986. After 1986, Tokar was an apprentice of the late lama and physician Dr. Trogawa Rinpoche, founder of the Chagpori Tibetan Medical Institute in Darjeeling, India. He has also studied with numerous other Tibetan doctors including Shakya Dorje, Thubten Phuntsog and Kuzang Nyima. He also trained in aspects of traditional Chinese medicine and Japanese medicine.

== Areas of interest and guest lectures ==
Tokar has lectured at American universities, medical colleges and institutions as well as internationally on traditional Asian medicine. His publications have appeared in American and international journals. Tokar's writings and lectures concern the theory and practice of Tibetan medicine, as well as the role of traditional Asian medicine in the context of its current globalization, including topics such as biopiracy and the intellectual property rights issue. While his work supports collaboration between traditional Asian medicine and biomedicine, Tokar is critical of certain modern approaches to medical integration and the application of research protocols that do not analyze the specific approaches used in traditional Asian medicine.

Tokar has served as an advisor to organizations such as the American Medical Student Association, and to the diplomatic office of the Dalai Lama in the US, the Office of Tibet.

In 2008 Tokar's article 'An Ancient Medicine in a New World: A Tibetan Medicine Doctor’s Reflection from ‘Inside' was featured along with the work of numerous international scholars in the book 'Tibetan Medicine in the Contemporary World: Global Politics of Medical Knowledge and Practice,' published by Routledge. In 2009 the book was awarded the International Convention of Asia Scholars Colleagues Choice Book Prize Award.

== Publications ==
- Tokar, Eliot 1998, A Tibetan medical perspective on irritable bowel syndrome: building a means of discourse for integrative medicine, Alternative and Complementary Therapies, 4(5): 343-349
- Tokar, Eliot, 1999, Seeing to the distant mountain: Diagnosis in Tibetan medicine, Alternative Therapies In Health And Medicine, 5(2): 50-58
- Tokar, Eliot 2006, Transformation and balance: The principles of Tibetan medicine in the context of American healthcare, Unified Energetics; 1:2, 47-51
- Tokar, Eliot 2006, Practicing an ancient tradition in the new world: A Tibetan medicine doctor's view, Unified Energetics; 1:2, 19-250
- Tokar, Eliot. 2007, Preservation And Progress: Using Tibetan Medicine As A Model To Define A Progressive Role For Traditional Asian Medicine In Modern Healthcare, Asian Medicine: Tradition and Modernity, 2(2): 303-314.
- Tokar, Eliot 2008, "An Ancient Medicine in a New World: A Tibetan Medicine Doctor’s Reflection from ‘Inside’." Tibetan Medicine in the Contemporary World: Global Politics of Medical Knowledge and Practice, Ed. Pordié, Laurent. London: Routledge. 229-248
- Tokar, Eliot 2015, Learning to Harmonize and Therefore to Heal, The Journal of Traditional Tibetan Medicine, 6: 12-14
- https://tricycle.org/dharmatalks/tibetan-medicine-ancient-wisdom-for-modern-health-and-healing/ Tokar, Eliot, 2018, April. Tibetan Medicine: Ancient Wisdom for Modern Health and Healing, Dharma Talks, Tricycle: The Buddhist Review website.

== See also ==
- Tibetan medicine
