= Caravan to Lhasa =

Book by Kamal Ratna Tuladhar

- Author: Kamal Ratna Tuladhar
- Genre: Travel literature
- Publisher: Various
- Publication date: 2011 (second edition)
- Media type: Print (Paperback)
- ISBN: 9789994658916

Caravan to Lhasa is a travel book and an account of the lives of expatriate Nepalese merchants in Lhasa from the 1920s to the 1960s. Written by Kamal Ratna Tuladhar, the book describes the caravan journey from Kathmandu across the Himalaya, and the life and times of the Newar traders in Tibet through the experiences of his merchant father Karuna Ratna Tuladhar (1920-2008) and uncles.

Karuna Ratna spent 17 years in Lhasa, from 1935-1946 and 1949-1954. He was born in Kathmandu to a merchant family, and took over the ancestral shop in Lhasa after his father's death in 1935.

Caravan to Lhasa is based on the centuries-old history of Kathmandu's Lhasa Newar merchants who lived for long periods at their business houses in Tibet and India, and operated a trading network linking South and Central Asia.

The book ends with the final return of the merchants after the Chinese takeover of Tibet and the flight of the Dalai Lama to India in 1959. The first edition appeared in 2004.

== See also ==
- Lhasa Newar (trans-Himalayan traders)
