= USS Pargo =

Two ships of the United States Navy have borne the name USS Pargo, named in honor of the pargo, a fish of the genus Lutjanus found in the West Indies.

- The first USS Pargo (SS-264), was a Gato-class submarine, commissioned in 1943 and struck in 1960.
- The second USS Pargo (SSN-650), was a Sturgeon-class submarine, commissioned in 1968 and struck in 1995.
