= Pargo Kaling =

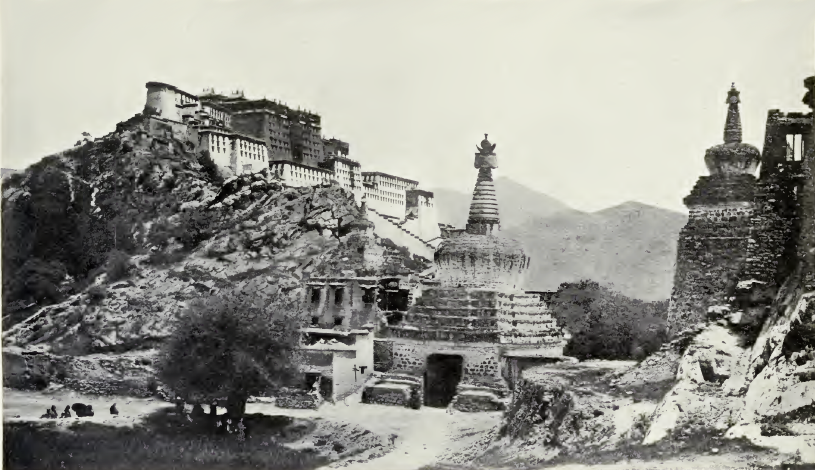
Photo of Lhasa's Western Gateway taken during the British expedition to Tibet, in 1903–1904.

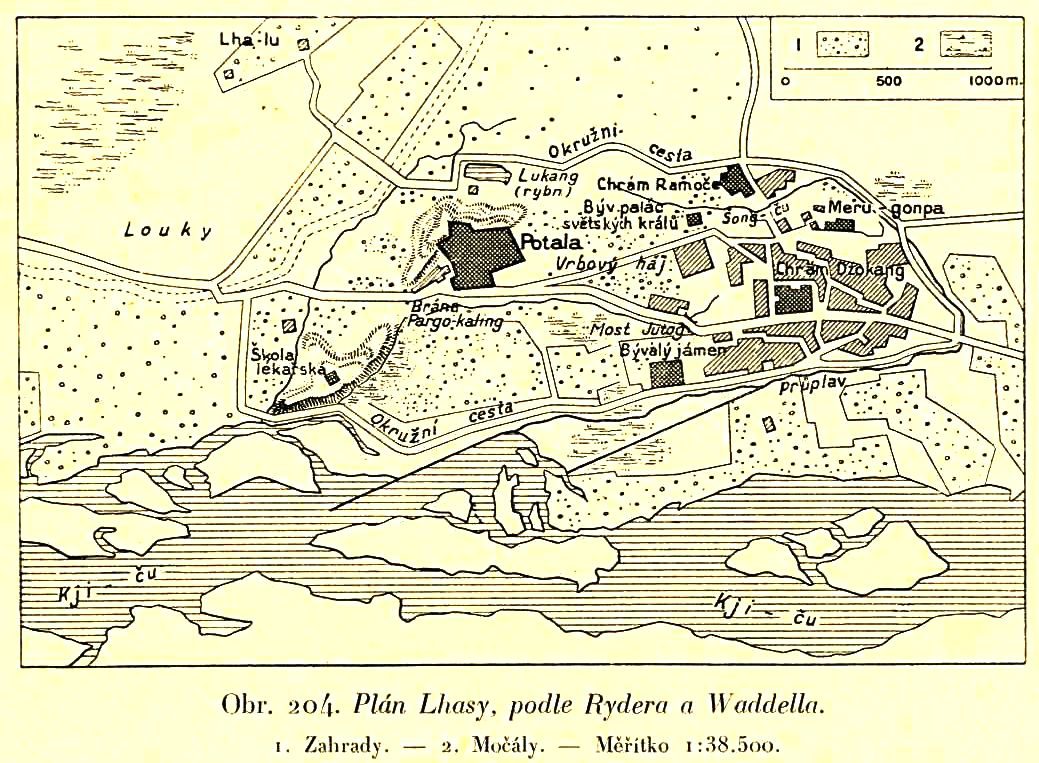
1932 map of Lhasa with descriptions in Czech and English. The Pargo Kaling Gate is located on the west side (left side) of this map next to the Potala Palace.

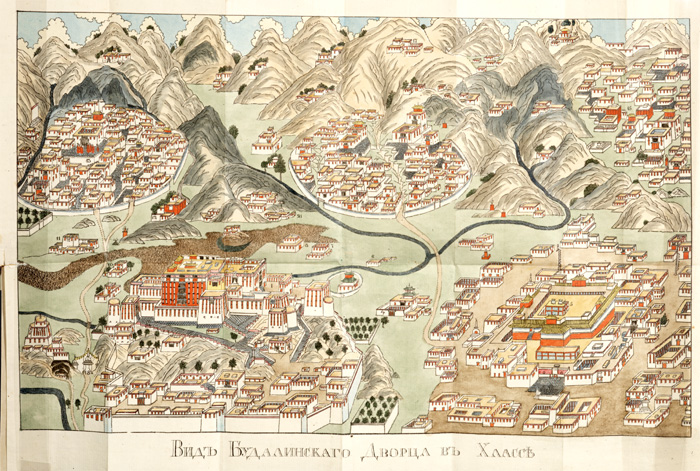
Map of Lhassa by Nikita Bichurin (first half of the 19th century). The Western Gate's three chortens can be seen in the left lower corner.

The Pargo Kaling (Tibetan: བར་སྒོ་བཀག་གླིང, Wylie: bar sgo bkag gling) was a large chorten straddling across the road leading from Drepung between the Potala's Red Hill (Marpori) and the Iron Hill (Chagpori) at Lhasa, Tibet, and containing a through-passage or archway for people and animals. It formed the "Western Gate" of the city and led into the village of Shol. It was destroyed in 1967, but the Lhasa authorities had it rebuilt in 1995.

== One of three chortens ==
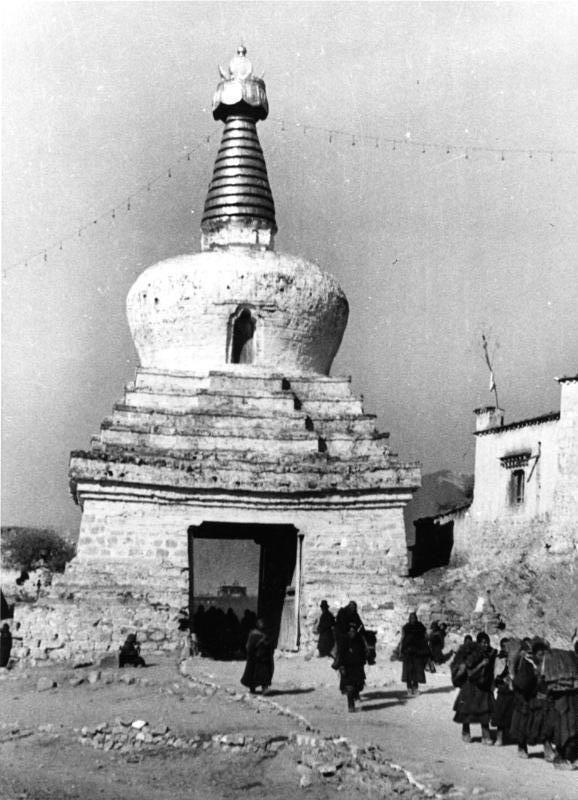
1938 photo of the rear façade of the Pargo Kaling central chorten with its wires furnished with small bells stretching from its spire to the top of the two smaller chortens.

As shown by photographs taken in 1904 and 1938, the Pargo Kaling chorten was one of three chortens: a second one was perched on the low ridge of Marpori and a third one stood on the low ridge of Chagpori. From the top of the middle chorten, wires furnished with small bells were stretched to the top of the two smaller chortens.

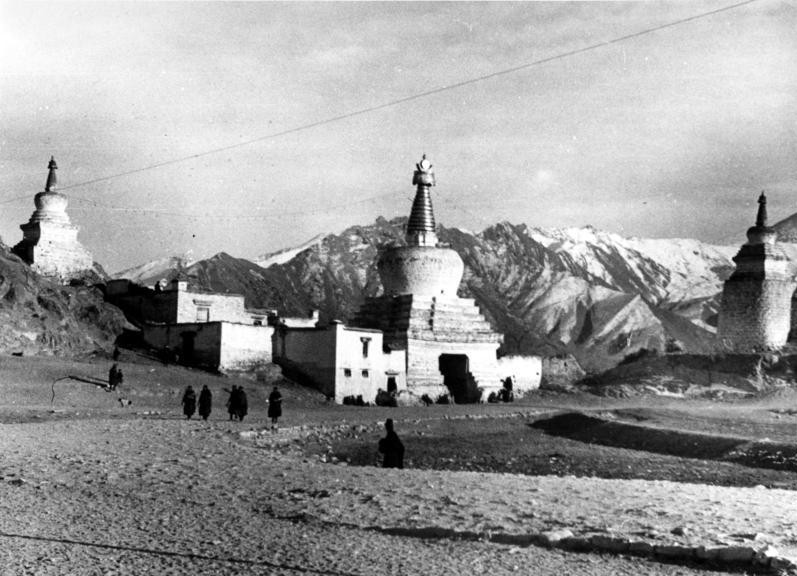
1938 photo of the front façade of the former Pargo Kaling chorten in Lhasa.

== Names ==
The Tibetan name of the Western Gate has several variants besides Pargo Kaling: Pawogaling (Peter Aufschnaiter), Drakgo Kaling (André Alexander), Barkokani or Bakokani (G. Ts. Tsybikoff), and Bar chorten (also G. Ts. Tsybikoff).

The oldest known representation of the Pargo Kaling Gate is found on a map of the city of Lhasa drawn by Nikita Bichurin in the first half of the 19th century. In the left lower corner, the larger centre chorten with its through-passage can be seen in between the two smaller side chortens.

== Representations ==
The Western Gate was the scene of the entrance of the British Army's invasion force to Lhasa on August 4, 1904. Preceded by the Chinese Imperial commissioner's escort., Younghusband's soldiers entered the city through the arch in the Pargo Kaling chorten

The Pargo Kaling chorten was also depicted in a scene of the 1997 movie Seven Years in Tibet, which was the adaptation of the book of that title by Heinrich Harrer. The cover art of the original motion picture soundtrack shows actor Brad Pitt and the young 14th Dalai Lama with the chorten in the background.

The English version of Peter Aufschnaiter's memoirs Eight Years in Tibet, published in 2002, includes a photo of the chorten with the caption "Pawogaling, the Western Stupa below the Potala."

A photo of the famous landmark is on the cover of Kamal Ratna Tuladhar's book, Caravan to Lhasa, published in 2004, about the story of Nepalese Newar traders in Tibet from the 1920s to the 1960s.

== A song to the Western Gate ==
In the 1980s, the lost Western Gate inspired a song sung by Tibetan singer Dadon. The lyrics of the first verse and the chorus go like this:

In front of the Potala Palace / There were three beloved stupas / Whenever the wind stirred the chimes / What resounding music there was / How melodious it sounded.

Aah stupa Drago Kaling / Aah, in my mind I suddenly remember / In the depth of my heart I suddenly remember you.

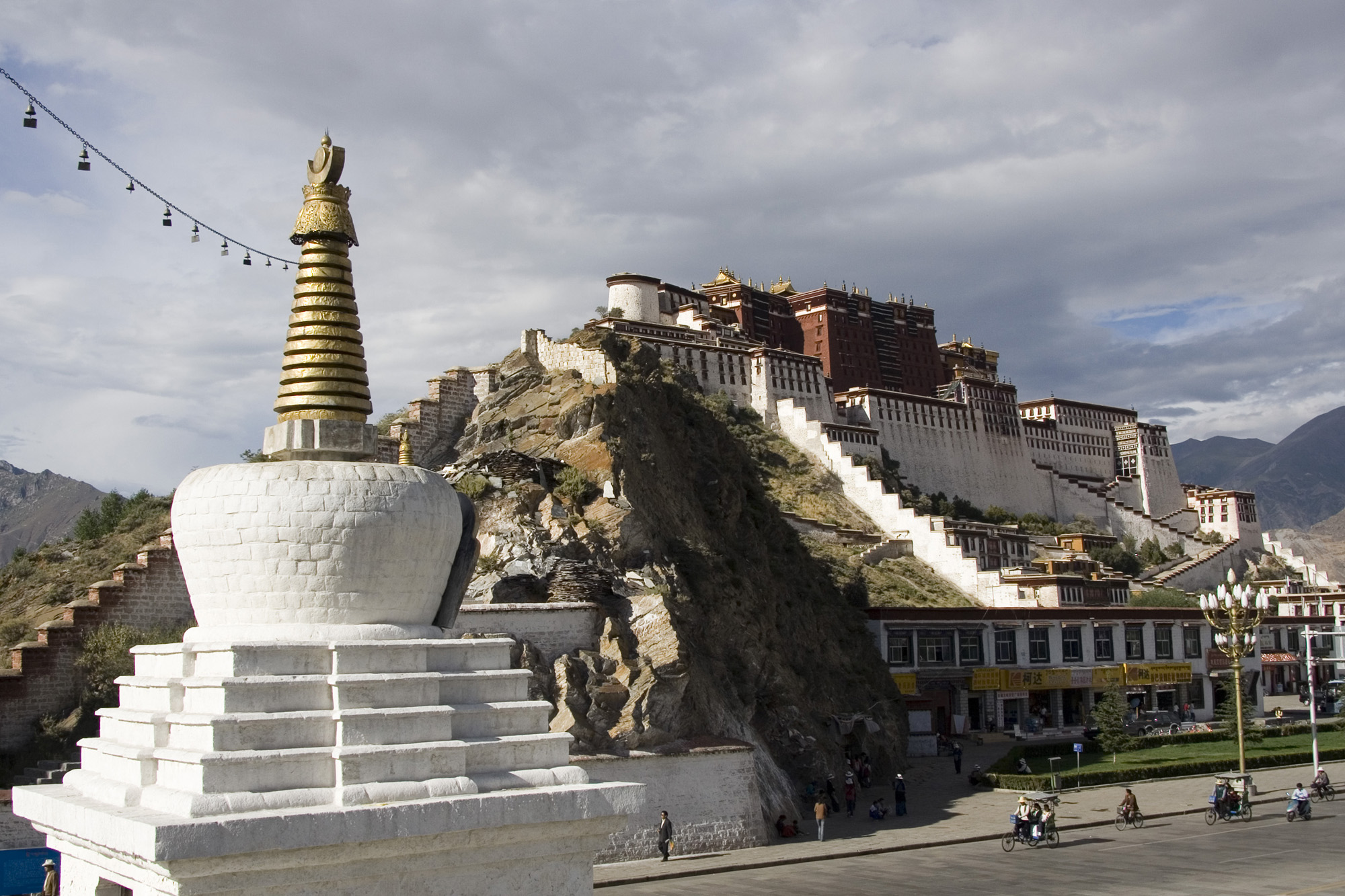
The reconstructed centre chorten in 2006.

== Gallery ==
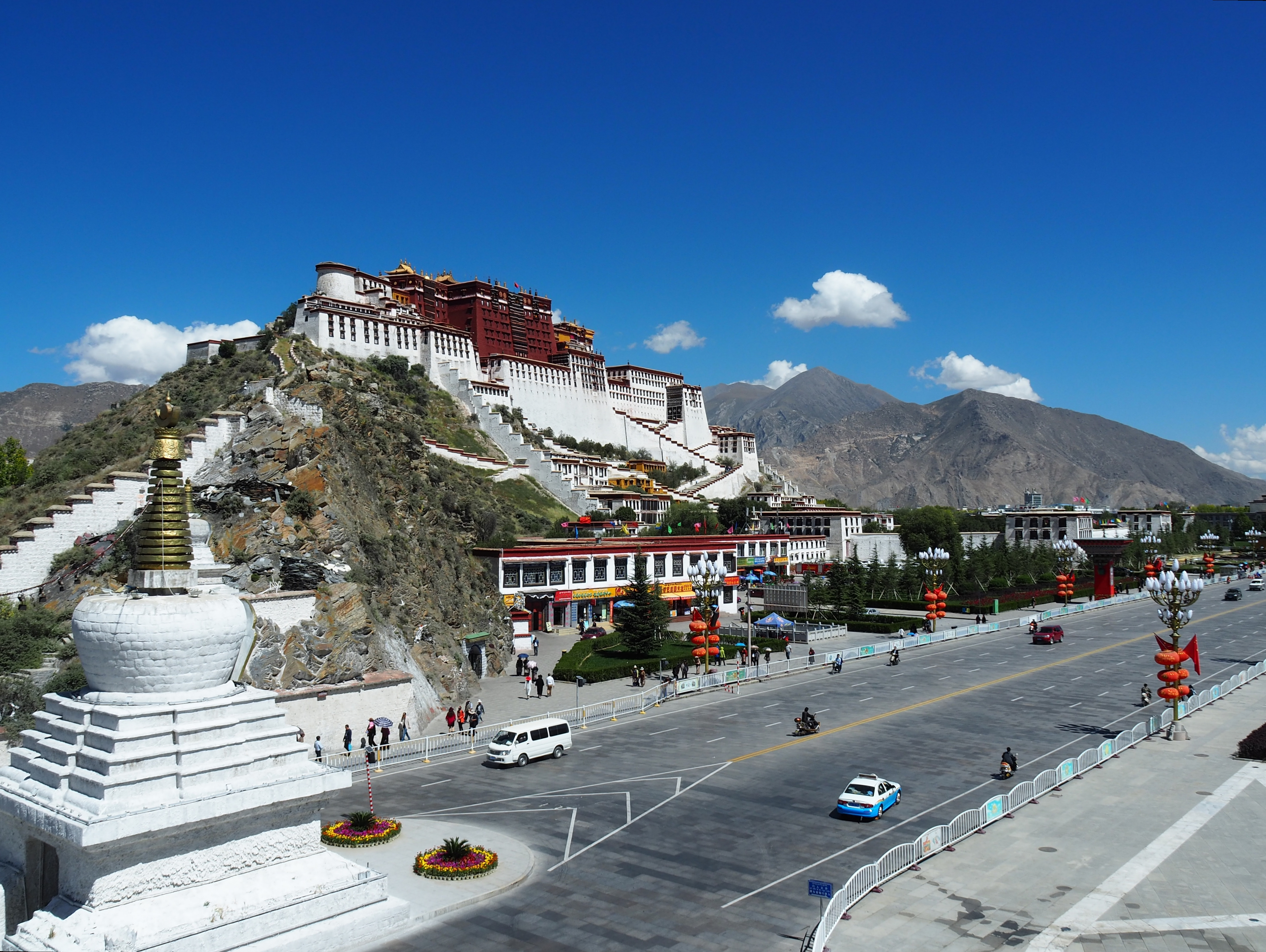
The centre chorten seen from Chagpori Hill (2015).

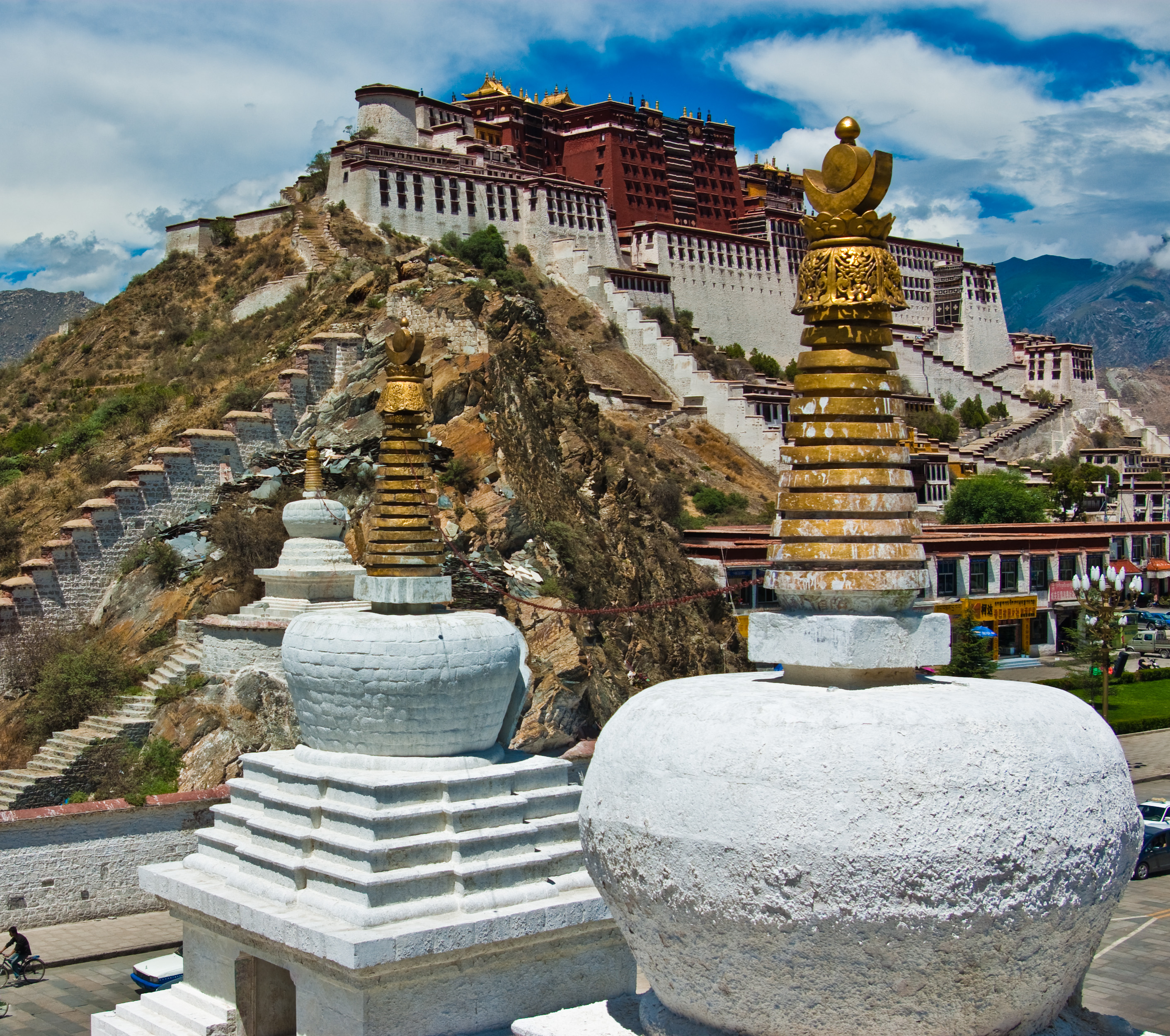
The three chortens seen from Chagpori Hill (2009).

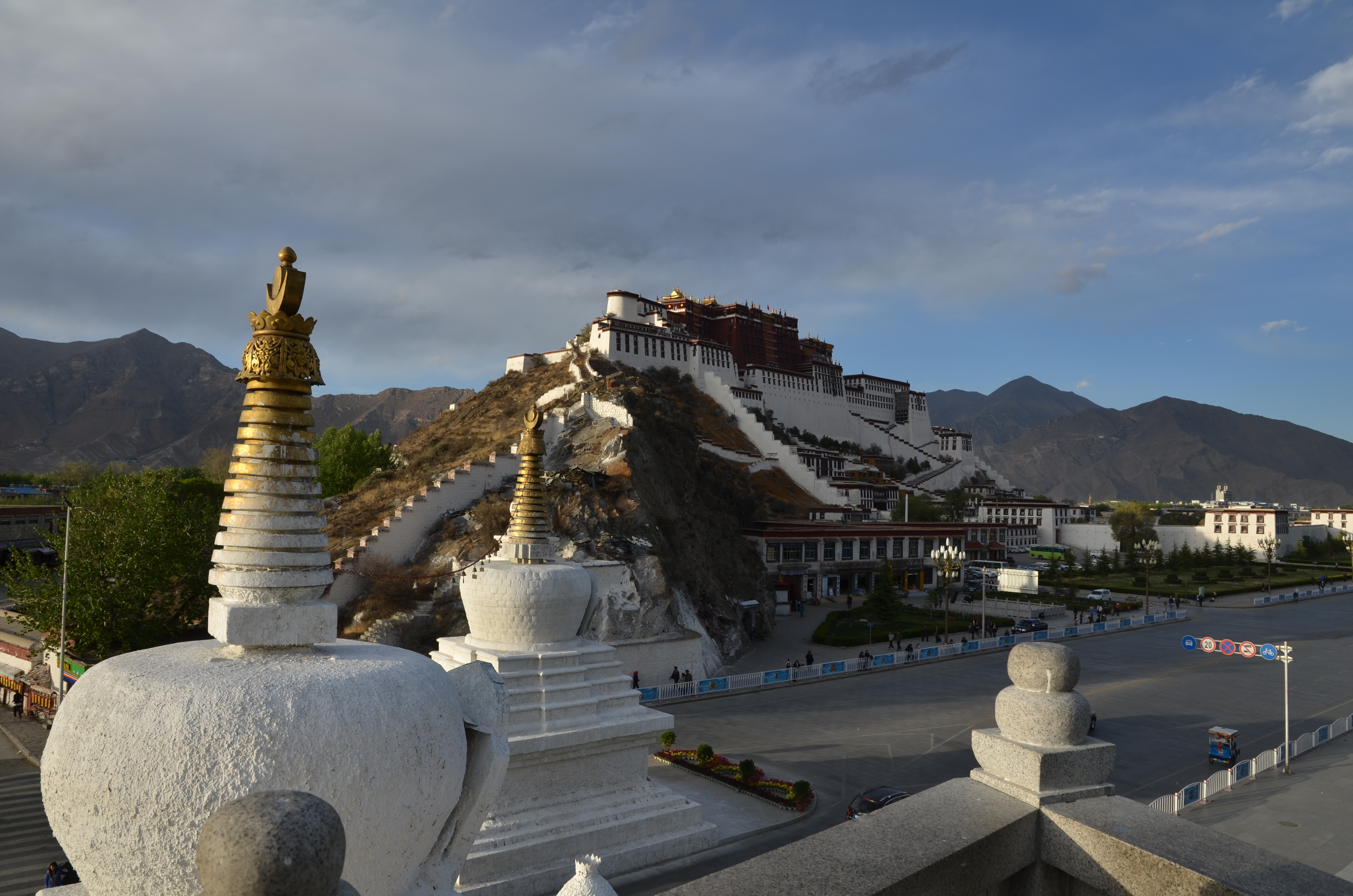
The centre chorten and the Chagpori Hill chorten (2011).

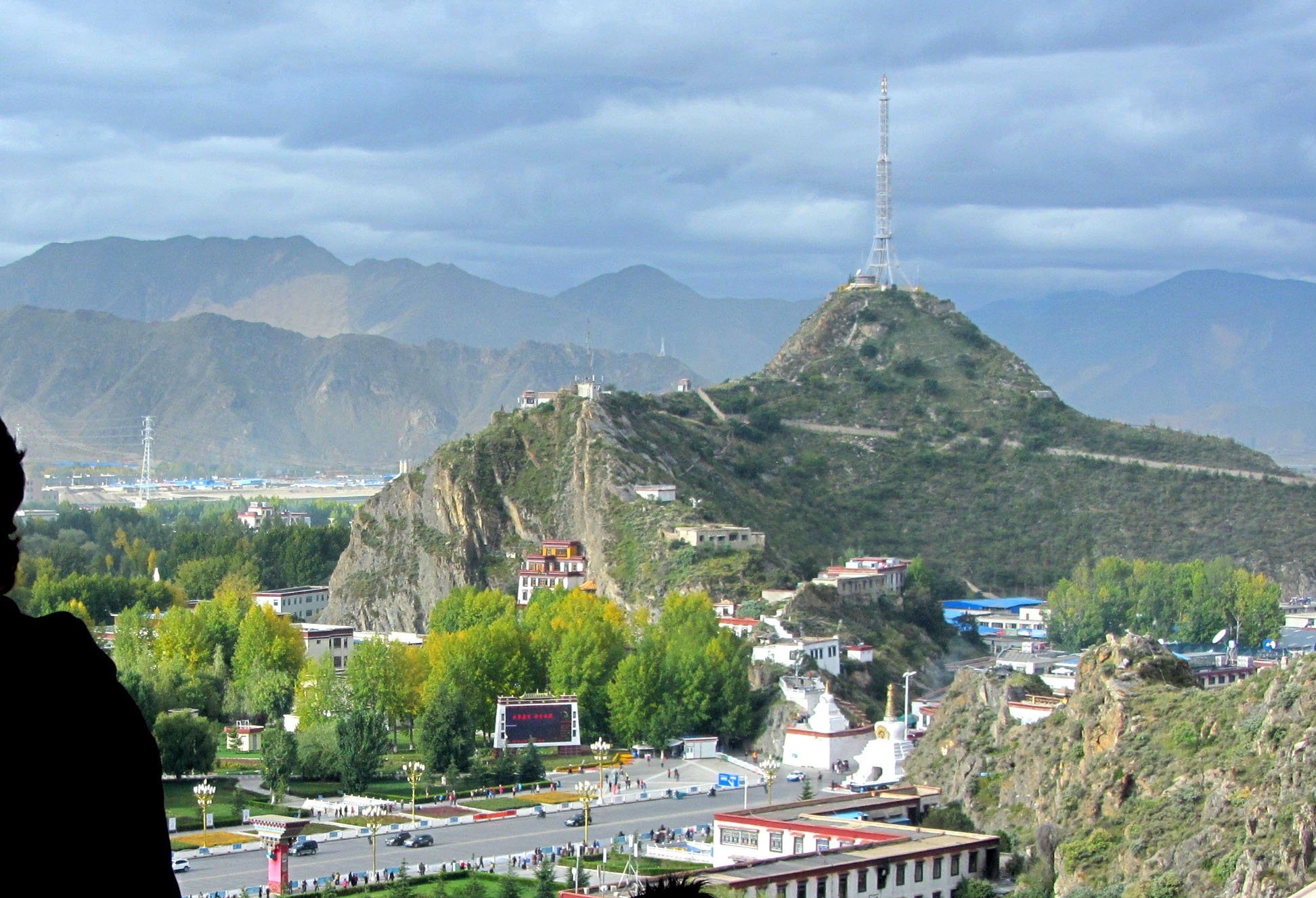
The centre chorten and Chagpori hill chorten seen from Marpori Hill (2013).
