= Tibetan astrology =

Tibetan astrology (Tibetan: དཀར་རྩིས, Wylie: dkar rtsis) is a traditional discipline of the Tibetan peoples that has influence from both Chinese astrology and Hindu astrology. Tibetan astrology is one of the 'Ten Sciences' (Wylie: rig-pa'i gnas bcu; Sanskrit: daśavidyā) in the enumeration honoured by this cultural tradition.

In the Tibetan Buddhist medical and tantric traditions, astrology is not regarded as superstition but rather as a practical tool to understand and heal our body and mind on the gross, subtle and very subtle levels. One can experience many sicknesses and misfortunes due to outer, inner and secret astrological reactions as well as malevolent celestial influences.

== Year-signs ==
The Year-signs cycle in an archetypal progression or continuum:

- Mouse
- Ox
- Tiger
- Rabbit
- Dragon
- Snake
- Horse
- Sheep
- Monkey
- Bird
- Dog
- Pig

== Animal signs and elements ==
Per:

Year	Animal	Element	Start date
1912	Mouse	Water	21-Dec-1911
1913	Ox	Water	9-Dec-1912
1914	Tiger	Wood	28-Dec-1913
1915	Rabbit	Wood	17-Dec-1914
1916	Dragon	Fire	7-Dec-1915
1917	Snake	Fire	25-Dec-1916
1918	Horse	Earth	15-Dec-1917
1919	Sheep	Earth	4-Dec-1918
1920	Monkey	Iron	23-Dec-1919
1921	Bird	Iron	11-Dec-1920
1922	Dog	Water	30-Dec-1921
1923	Pig	Water	19-Dec-1922
1924	Mouse	Wood	8-Dec-1923
1925	Ox	Wood	26-Dec-1924
1926	Tiger	Fire	16-Dec-1925
1927	Rabbit	Fire	6-Dec-1926
1928	Dragon	Earth	24-Dec-1927
1929	Snake	Earth	12-Dec-1928
1930	Horse	Iron	31-Dec-1929
1931	Sheep	Iron	20-Dec-1930
1932	Monkey	Water	10-Dec-1931
1933	Bird	Water	28-Dec-1932
1934	Dog	Wood	18-Dec-1933
1935	Pig	Wood	7-Dec-1934
1936	Mouse	Fire	26-Dec-1935
1937	Ox	Fire	14-Dec-1936
1938	Tiger	Earth	2-Jan-1938
1939	Rabbit	Earth	22-Dec-1938
1940	Dragon	Iron	11-Dec-1939
1941	Snake	Iron	29-Dec-1940
1942	Horse	Water	19-Dec-1941
1943	Sheep	Water	8-Dec-1942
1944	Monkey	Wood	28-Dec-1943
1945	Bird	Wood	16-Dec-1944
1946	Dog	Fire	5-Dec-1945
1947	Pig	Fire	24-Dec-1946
1948	Mouse	Earth	13-Dec-1947
1949	Ox	Earth	31-Dec-1948
1950	Tiger	Iron	20-Dec-1949
1951	Rabbit	Iron	10-Dec-1950
1952	Dragon	Water	29-Dec-1951
1953	Snake	Water	17-Dec-1952
1954	Horse	Wood	7-Dec-1953
1955	Sheep	Wood	26-Dec-1954
1956	Monkey	Fire	15-Dec-1955
1957	Bird	Fire	1-Jan-1957
1958	Dog	Earth	22-Dec-1957
1959	Pig	Earth	11-Dec-1958
1960	Mouse	Iron	30-Dec-1959
1961	Ox	Iron	19-Dec-1960
1962	Tiger	Water	8-Dec-1961
1963	Rabbit	Water	27-Dec-1962
1964	Dragon	Wood	16-Dec-1963
1965	Snake	Wood	4-Dec-1964
1966	Horse	Fire	23-Dec-1965
1967	Sheep	Fire	12-Dec-1966
1968	Monkey	Earth	31-Dec-1967
1969	Bird	Earth	20-Dec-1968
1970	Dog	Iron	10-Dec-1969
1971	Pig	Iron	29-Dec-1970
1972	Mouse	Water	18-Dec-1971
1973	Ox	Water	6-Dec-1972
1974	Tiger	Wood	25-Dec-1973
1975	Rabbit	Wood	14-Dec-1974
1976	Dragon	Fire	2-Jan-1976
1977	Snake	Fire	21-Dec-1976
1978	Horse	Earth	11-Dec-1977
1979	Sheep	Earth	30-Dec-1978
1980	Monkey	Iron	20-Dec-1979
1981	Bird	Iron	8-Dec-1980
1982	Dog	Water	27-Dec-1981
1983	Pig	Water	16-Dec-1982
1984	Mouse	Wood	4-Jan-1984
1985	Ox	Wood	23-Dec-1984
1986	Tiger	Fire	12-Dec-1985
1987	Rabbit	Fire	1-Jan-1987
1988	Dragon	Earth	21-Dec-1987
1989	Snake	Earth	10-Dec-1988
1990	Horse	Iron	28-Dec-1989
1991	Sheep	Iron	18-Dec-1990
1992	Monkey	Water	7-Dec-1991
1993	Bird	Water	24-Dec-1992
1994	Dog	Wood	14-Dec-1993
1995	Pig	Wood	2-Jan-1995
1996	Mouse	Fire	22-Dec-1995
1997	Ox	Fire	11-Dec-1996
1998	Tiger	Earth	30-Dec-1997
1999	Rabbit	Earth	19-Dec-1998
2000	Dragon	Iron	8-Dec-1999
2001	Snake	Iron	26-Dec-2000
2002	Horse	Water	15-Dec-2001
2003	Sheep	Water	3-Jan-2003
2004	Monkey	Wood	24-Dec-2003
2005	Bird	Wood	13-Dec-2004
2006	Dog	Fire	1-Jan-2006
2007	Pig	Fire	21-Dec-2006
2008	Mouse	Earth	10-Dec-2007
2009	Ox	Earth	8-Jan-2008
2010	Tiger	Iron	
2011	Rabbit	Iron	
2012	Dragon	Water	
2013	Snake	Water	
2014	Horse	Wood	
2015	Sheep	Wood	
2016	Monkey	Fire	
2017	Bird	Fire	
2018	Dog	Earth	
2019	Pig	Earth	
2020	Mouse	Iron	

== Favourable and non-favourable days by animal sign ==
The Tibetan calendar is based on Tibetan astrology and is calculated for midday in European Std Time (GMT+2).

Table below show the days of the weeks (and corresponding planets) that are considered generally favourable or not favourable for the 12 Tibetan astrological signs.

For the start of new or important activities it is advisable to avoid the unfavourable week days in the calendar.

Animal Sign	Favourable	Non Favourable
Mouse	Wednesday (Mercury)	Saturday (Saturn)
Ox	Saturday (Saturn)	Thursday (Jupiter)
Tiger	Thursday (Jupiter)	Friday (Venus)
Rabbit	Thursday (Jupiter)	Friday (Venus)
Dragon	Sunday (Sun)	Thursday (Jupiter)
Snake	Tuesday (Mars)	Wednesday (Mercury)
Horse	Tuesday (Mars)	Wednesday (Mercury)
Sheep	Friday (Venus)	Thursday (Jupiter)
Monkey	Friday (Venus)	Tuesday (Mars)
Bird	Friday (Venus)	Tuesday (Mars)
Dog	Monday (Moon)	Thursday (Jupiter)
Pig	Wednesday (Mercury)	Saturday (Saturn)

== Vaiḍūrya dKar-po ==
The names of the chapters of the Vaiḍūrya dKar-po (Tibetan illuminated manuscript describing astrological divination, also known as The White Beryl) are:

- 1. "Aspects of Turtle Divination"
- 2. "Hidden Points"
- 3. "Geomantic Aspects"
- 10. "The Thirty Computational Charts"
- 11. "The Thirteen Charts"

== See also ==
- Jyotisha (Indian astrology)
- Chinese astrology
- Losar
- Tibetan calendar
- Culture of Tibet
- Tibetan people
