= Traditional Tibetan medicine =

System of traditional medicine originating from the Greater Tibet Region(s)

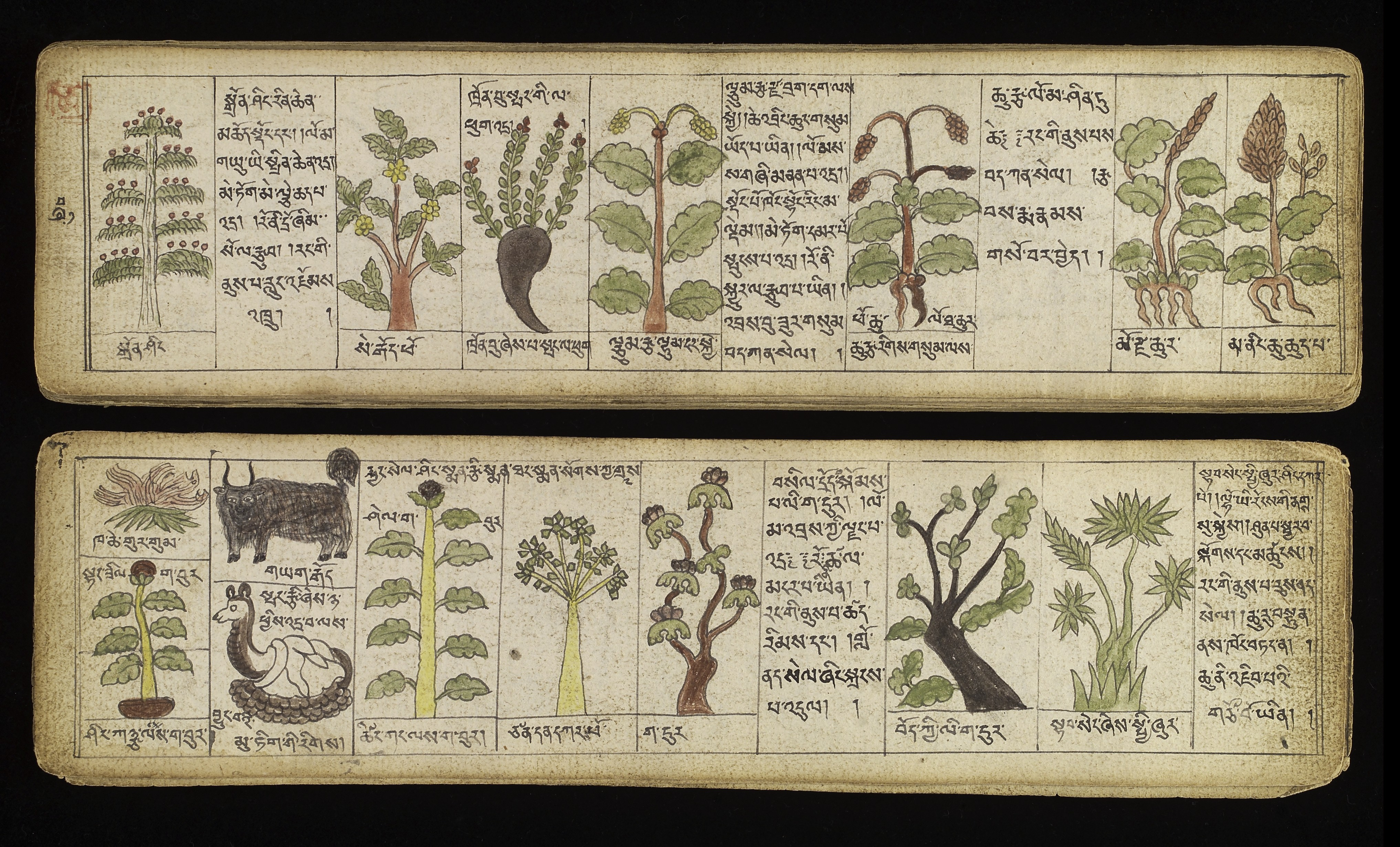
Illustrations of Tibetan materia medica

Traditional Tibetan medicine or Sowa Rigpa (Tibetan: གསོ་བ་རིག་པ། (bod lugs) Gso ba rig pa) is the Tibetan medical system developed in the 8th century under King Trisong Detsen that incorporated the best international medical practices of that time. The medical treatise Giyud Shi, or the Four Tantras, was then originally composed and later edited in the 12th century.

Tibetan medicine employs multiple approaches to diagnosis that incorporate techniques including venesection, moxibustion, compression therapy, medicinal bathing, and massage. The pharmacology relies on complex formulas of multi-ingredient medicines that use herbs, minerals, metals, and animal products.

The Tibetan medical system's Four Tantras was based on Tibet's indigenous health practices, and this knowledge joined that of the 8th century invited conference attendants arriving from Greece, Persia, India, China, and Central Asia that met at Samye Monastery and formed Trisong Detsen's Medical Council, composed of respected international practitioners. Together they developed Sowa Rigpa.

The current practice of Sowa Rigpa or Tibetan medicine is mostly based on the 12th century edits by Yuthok Yongten Gompo the Younger to the original "Four Tantras" medical treatise prepared by Yuthok Yongten Gompo the Elder.

Tibetan medicine has since spread to the Ladakh and Sikkim regions of northern India, to the western and northern parts of Nepal, and throughout Bhutan. Historically, Mongolia and Turkestan (currently Inner Mongolia, Xinjiang) and the Mongolian-populated areas in the northeast have been greatly influenced by Tibetan medicine. Tibetan medicine is also predominantly used in the Buryat and Tuva regions of the Russian Federation, as well as the Republic of Kalmykia, located in the Volga River basin.

Tibetan medicine embraces the traditional Buddhist belief that all illness ultimately results from the three poisons: delusion, greed and aversion. Tibetan medicine follows the Buddha's Four Noble Truths which apply medical diagnostic logic to suffering.

== History ==
The pre-empire Tibetan people's accumulative knowledge of their local plants and their various usages for benefiting people's health were collected by Tonpa Shenrab Miwoche (སྟོན་པོ་གཤེན་རབ་མི་བོ་ཆེ།), and passed down to one of his sons. Later, Yuthok Yontan Gonpo the Elder compiled these practices and authored the Gyud Shi or the Four Tantras. The Four Tantras then became a medical source for the 8th century Medical Council convened by Tibetan King Trisong Detsen at Samye Monastery. The Council gathered to compile the best of additional medical sources from Greece, Turkestan, India, China, Persia, and Central Asia and to develop Sowa Rigpa or the Tibetan Art of Healing.

Later in the 11th and 12th centuries, a number of additional Indian medical texts were also transmitted. While the Ayurvedic Astāngahrdayasamhitā or the Heart of Medicine Compendium attributed to Vagbhata was translated into Tibetan by Rinchen Zangpo (རིན་ཆེན་བཟང་པོ།) (957–1055), Ayurvedic practices had already been adopted in the 8th century by the Tibetan medical Council. Tibet had also absorbed the early Indian Abhidharma literature, for example the 5th century Abhidharmakosasabhasyam by Vasubandhu, which expounds upon medical topics, such as fetal development. A wide range of Indian Vajrayana tantras, containing practices based on medical anatomy, had likewise been adopted by Tibet.

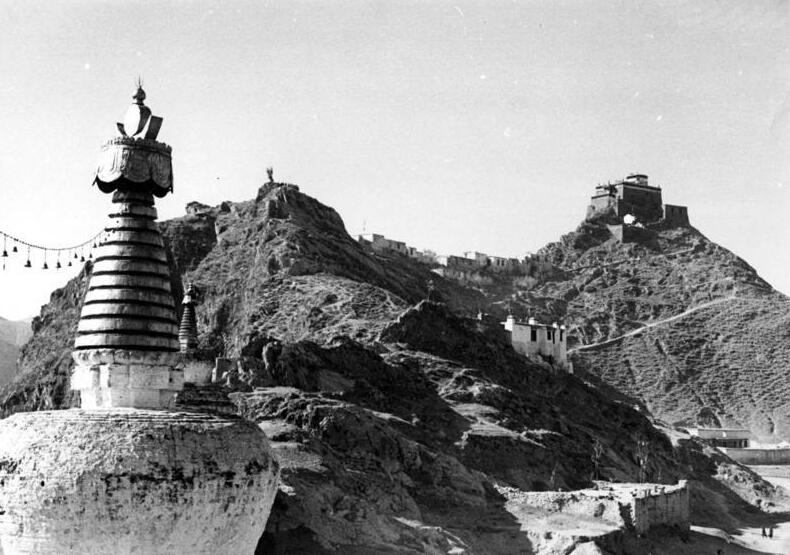
Chagpori College of Medicine in 1938

In the 12th century, Yuthok Yontan Gonpo the Younger (གཡུ་ཐོག་ཡོན་ཏན་མགོན་པོ།) visited India six times before editing the Gyud Shi, or Four Tantras, into its 156 chapters that are still in current use. Around the turn of the 14th century, the Drangti family of physicians established a curriculum based on the Four Tantras and on supplementary literature from the Yutok school at Sakya Monastery (ས་སྐྱ་དགོན།) .

The 5th Dalai Lama (ཏཱ་ལའི་བླ་མ་སྐུ་ཕྲེང་ལྔ་བ།) commissioned Kalon Sangye Gyatso (སྡེ་སྲིད་སངས་རྒྱས་རྒྱ་མཚོ།) to establish the Chagpori College of Medicine in 1696. Chagpori taught Gyamtso's Blue Beryl as well as the Four Tantras in a model that spread throughout Tibet along with the oral tradition.

In the 18th century Tibetan medical practices began gaining international acclaim after missionaries who arrived in Tibet featured Tibetan medicine in their recorded travelogues, and by 1789 the British surgeon Robert Saunder published an article on the process of making Tibetan medicines. In the 1850s, the Russian capital at Saint Petersburg opened a clinic of Tibetan medicine and a specialized school of Tibetan medicine. By 1898, a part of the Tibetan medical masterpiece the Four Tantras or the Four Medical Classics, was translated into the Russian language. In Poland, Tibetan medicine was practiced in the 1920s, and two presidents, Stanisław Wojciechowski and Ignacy Mościcki were both treated with Tibetan medicine. In 1969, the PADMA AG based in Zurich, Switzerland, was the first Western pharmaceutical company to specialize in the production and sale of Tibetan medicine.

In September 1959, the Tibetan People's Government merged the Men-tsee-khang (སྨན་རྩིས་ཁང་) and Chagpori College of Medicine and established the Lhasa Tibetan Hospital on this basis. In September 1961, at the congress of Tibetan doctors in Lhasa area, Chingpo Lobu was appointed as the director of Lhasa Tibetan Hospital. On September 1, 1980, the Chinese government of the Tibet Autonomous Region expanded Lhasa Tibetan Hospital to become Tibetan Hospital of Tibet Autonomous Region (西藏自治区藏医院), laying a solid foundation for the vigorous development of Tibetan medicine. In 1999, Tibet Nordicam Pharmaceuticals Co., Ltd. became the first high-tech pharmaceutical listed enterprise of the Tibet Autonomous Region. In 2006, a medical group from the Tibet Autonomous Region was established in Lhasa, and by 2023 the Tibetan Hospital of Tibet Autonomous Region was renamed as the National Center for Traditional Chinese Medicine, "incorporating indigenous remedies" but removing references to Tibetan medicine and to Tibet.

== Four Tantras ==
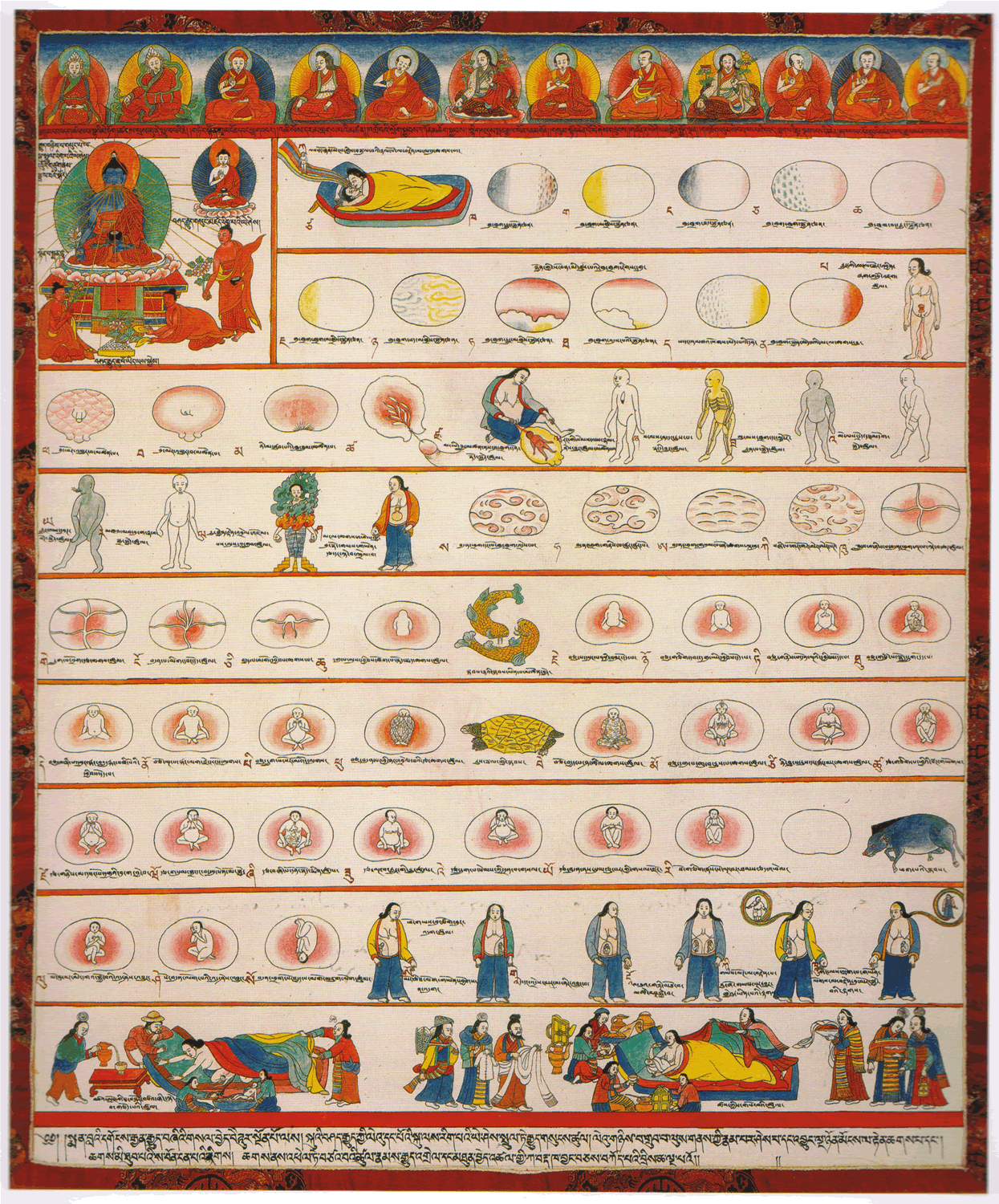
Illustration (Conception to Birth) from Ornament to the Mind of Medicine Buddha- Blue Beryl Lamp Illuminating Four Tantras written around the year 1720 by Sangye Gyatso

The Four Tantras or Gyu shi (རྒྱུད་བཞི།) is an 8th century Tibetan text incorporating medical systems and practices of Tibet, India, Greece, Persia, Central Asia, and China. The Four Tantras treatise dates from the 8th century and its 12th century edition is still considered the basis of Tibetan medical practises. The Four Tantras is the common name for the text of the Secret Tantra Instruction on the Eight Branches, the Immortality Elixir essence. It considers a single medical doctrine from four perspectives. Sage Vidyajnana expounded their manifestation.

The basis of the Tibetan system of Four Tantras is to keep the three bodily humors in balance : The wind rlung, the bile mkhris pa, and the phlegm bad kan. These three foci differentiate Tibetan medicine from Chinese medicine's two foci - the ying and the yang. The Four Tantras can be described as follows:

- Root Tantra – A general outline of the principles of Tibetan medicine, it discusses the humors in the body and their imbalances, and their links to illnesses. The Four Tantras use visual observation to diagnose predominantly the analysis of the pulse, the tongue and the analysis of the urine, in modern terms known as urinalysis
- Explanatory Tantra – This section discusses in greater detail the theory behind the Four Tantras and gives general theories on subjects such as anatomy, physiology, psychopathology, embryology and treatment therapy.
- Oral Instruction Tantra – The longest of the tantras, it is mainly a practical application of treatment. It explains in detail illnesses and which humoral imbalance cause which illness. This section also describes specific treatments for the illnesses.
- Subsequent Tantra – Diagnosis and therapies, and it includes the preparation of Tibetan medicine and the cleansing of the body internally and externally with the use of techniques such as moxibustion, massage and minor surgeries.

== Three principles of function ==
Like other systems of traditional Asian medicine, and in contrast to biomedicine, Tibetan medicine first puts forth a specific definition of health in its theoretical texts. To have good health, Tibetan medical theory states that it is necessary to maintain balance in the body's three principles of function [often translated as humors]: rLung (pron. Loong), mKhris-pa (pron. Tri-pa) [often translated as bile], and Bad-kan (pron. Bae-kan) [often translated as phlegm].

• rLung is the source of the body's ability to circulate physical substances (e.g. blood), energy (e.g. nervous system impulses), and the non-physical (e.g. thoughts). In embryological development, the mind's expression of materialism is manifested as the system of rLung. There are five distinct subcategories of rLung each with specific locations and functions: Srog-'Dzin rLüng, Gyen-rGyu rLung, Khyab-Byed rLüng, Me-mNyam rLung, Thur-Sel rLüng.

• mKhris-pa is characterized by the quantitative and qualitative characteristics of heat, and is the source of many functions such as thermoregulation, metabolism, liver function and discriminating intellect. In embryological development, the mind's expression of aggression is manifested as the system of mKhris-pa. There are five distinct subcategories of mKhris-pa each with specific locations and functions: 'Ju-Byed mKhris-pa, sGrub-Byed mKhris-pa, mDangs-sGyur mKhris-pa, mThong-Byed mKhris-pa, mDog-Sel mKhris-pa.

• Bad-kan is characterized by the quantitative and qualitative characteristics of cold, and is the source of many functions such as aspects of digestion, the maintenance of our physical structure, joint health and mental stability. In embryological development, the mind's expression of ignorance is manifested as the system of Bad-kan. There are five distinct subcategories of Bad-kan each with specific locations and functions: rTen-Byed Bad-kan, Myag-byed Bad-kan, Myong-Byed Bad-kan, Tsim-Byed Bad-kan, 'Byor-Byed Bad-kan.

== Usage ==
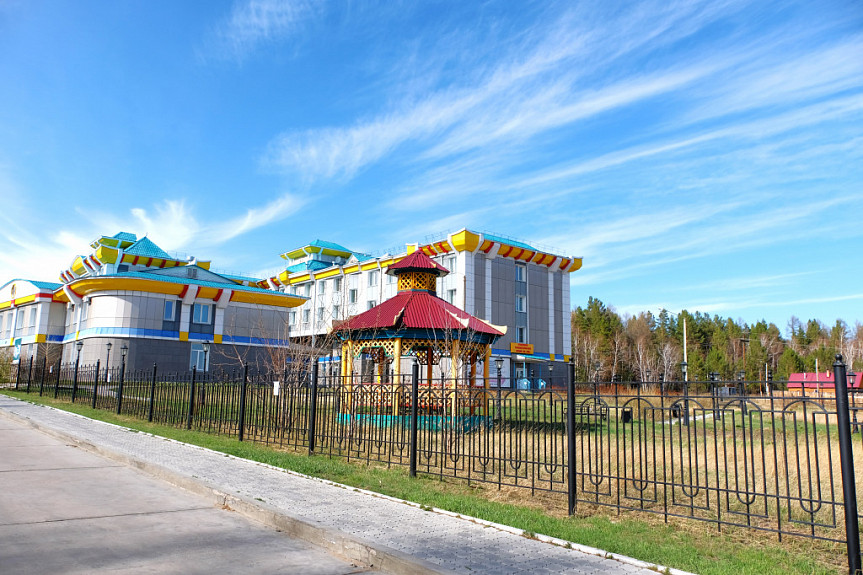
Center for Oriental Medicine, Ulan-Ude, Buryatia, Russia

Tibetan medicine and medical practices outside of Tibet are seen widely in the Himalayan region. In India, the Council of Tibetan Medicine provides formal recognition to Tibetan medical colleges, while the Tibetan Medical and Astrological Institute and its Men-Tsee-Khang operate under the auspices of the Office of the Dalai Lama. In 2010, the Government of India officially recognized Sowa Rigpa as a "science of healing" and has since approved the establishment of the "National Institute for Sowa Rigpa" (NISR) in Leh, Ladakh, to provide opportunities for research and development of Tibetan medicine's Sowa Rigpa. In addition, Tibetologists from Tibet have traveled to European countries such as Spain to lecture on the topic.

In Nepal, Tibetan Sowa Rigpa doctors, Men-Tsee-Khangs, and their clinics have been historically active in mountainous communities while the practices have spread to urban areas throughout the country, treating all people including foreign visitors. An accredited medical college called Sowa Rigpa International College opened in 2016. Their students come to Nepal as local students and also travel from India, Bhutan, Finland, England, and Spain.

A key objective of China's People's Government of Tibet Autonomous Region is to promote traditional Tibetan medicine among the other ethnic groups in China. The Tibet University of Traditional Tibetan Medicine and the Qinghai University Medical School offer courses in the practice. In 2000, an international academic conference on Tibetan medicine was held in Lhasa to discuss the current situation and prospects of the development of the Tibetan medicine industry. In December 2003, nine bureaus and institutes under the Chinese Academy of Sciences, such as the Northwest Plateau Institute, the Kunming Institute of Zoology and Animal Science and the Shanghai Institute of Pharmaceutical Sciences, and experts from the relevant departments of the Tibet Autonomous Region, convened in Chengdu to hold a seminar on the cooperation between the academy and the region for the promotion of the modernization of Tibetan medicines. In May 2004, six national projects were approved on the promotion of modernization of Tibetan medicines held in Beijing.

== Notable practitioners ==
- Akong Rinpoche
- Tenzin Choedrak
- Yeshi Dhonden
- Yuthog Yontan Gonpo
- Desi Sangye Gyatso
- Lobsang Dolma Khangkar
- Tsewang Dolkar Khangkar
- Thang Tong Gyalpo
- Eliot Tokar
- Yuthok Yontan Gonpo the Younger

== See also ==
- Ayurveda
- Lung (Tibetan Buddhism)
- Music therapy
- Nagarjuna
- Naturopathy
- Pharmacognosy
- Siddha
- Trul khor
- Tsalung
- Unani
- Yoga
