= List of Tibetan writers =

This is a chronological list of important Tibetan writers.

== 7th-10th century ==
| Name | Dates | Wylie transliteration | Other names | Notes |
|---|---|---|---|---|
| Thonmi Sambhota | 7th century | thon mi sam bho ta | - | Inventor of the Tibetan script |
| Yeshe Tsogyal | 757-817 | ye shes mtsho rgyal | Princess of Kharchen; Great Bliss Queen | Consort of Padmasambhava |
| Nampar Nangdze Lotsawa | 8th century | rnam par snang mdzad lo tsa ba | Vairotsana | Translator of Buddhist scriptures from Sanskrit into Tibetan during the first phase of translation |
| Padmasambhava | 8th to 9th century | pad ma 'byung gnas | Guru Rinpoche | Brought Buddhism to Tibet |
| Yuthok Yonten Gonpo (the Elder) | 708–833 | g.yu thog yon tan mgon po | - | Author of foundational works on Tibetan medicine (rgyud bzhi, Gyüschi) |
| Lochen Rinchen Sangpo | 957–1055 | lo chen rin chen bzang po | - | First translator of Sarma texts |

== 11th century ==
| Name | Dates | Wylie transliteration | Other names | Notes |
|---|---|---|---|---|
| Machig Labdrön | 1055–1149 | ma gcig lab sgron | Dorje Dudul Chenmo | Famous yogini, promoter of Chöd in Tibet |
| Marpa Lotsawa | 1012–1097 | mar pa | - | Important translator of Sarma texts |
| Milarepa | 11th to 12th century | mi la ras pa | Jetsün | Famous yogi, known for his Vajra songs |
| Langri Tangpa | 1054–1123 | glang ri thang pa | Geshe | Kadam tradition |
| Patsab Nyima Drakpa | born 1055 | pa tshab lo tsa ba nyi ma grags pa | - | Translated many Madhyamaka texts |
| Gampopa | 1079–1153 | sgam po pa | Sönam Rinchen, Dagpo Lhaje, Nyamed Dakpo Rinpoche, Da'od Zhonnu | Founder of Kagyu |
| Sachen Kunga Nyingpo | 1092–1158 | sa chen kun dga’ snying po | 3rd Sakya Trizin | Systematised teachings of the Sakya tradition |

== 12th century ==
| Name | Dates | Wylie transliteration | Other names | Notes |
|---|---|---|---|---|
| Chekawa Yeshe Dorje | 1102–1176 | 'chad ka ba ye shes rdo rje | Geshe Chekhawa | Wrote the Seven Points of Spiritual Training |
| Phagmo Drupa | 1110–1170 | phag mo gru pa | Dorje Gyalpo | - |
| Yuthok Yontan Gonpo the Younger | 1126–1202 | g.yu thog yon tan mgon po | - | Contributions to Tibetan medicine |
| Sonam Tsemo | 1142–1182 | bsod nams rtse mo | 4th Sakya Trizin | - |
| Jigten Sumgön | 1143–1217 | 'jig rten gsum mgon | Drikungpa | Founder of Drigung Kagyu |
| Drakpa Gyaltsen | 1147–1216 | grags pa rgyal mtshan | 5th Sakya Trizin | Commentator on Asvaghosa's Fifty Verses of Guru Devotion |
| Sakya Pandita Kunga Gyaltsen | 1182–1251 | sa skya pandi ta kun dga’ rgyal mtshan | 6th Sakya Trizin | - |

== 13th century ==
| Name | Dates | Wylie transliteration | Other names | Notes |
|---|---|---|---|---|
| Karma Pakshi | 1204–1283 | karma pak shi | 2nd Karmapa | Wrote over 100 texts on Buddhism, preserved at Tsurphu Monastery |
| Drogön Chögyal Phagpa Lodrö Gyaltsen | 1235–1279/80 | chos rgyal 'phags pa blo gros rgyal mtshan | 7th Sakya Trizin | Devised the 'Phags-pa script |
| Rangjung Dorje | 1284–1339 | rang byung rdo rje | 3rd Karmapa | - |
| Buton Rinchen Drub | 1290–1364 | bu ston rin chen grub | 11th Abbot of Shalu Monastery | Catalogued thousands of religious and philosophical works |
| Dolpopa Sherab Gyaltsen | 1292–1361 | dol po pa shes rab rgyal mtshan | - | See also Jonang, Kalacakra |

== 14th century ==
| Name | Dates | Wylie transliteration | Other names | Notes |
|---|---|---|---|---|
| Karma Lingpa | 14th century | karma gling pa | Tertön | - |
| Longchen Rabjam | 1308–1364 | klong chen rab 'byams | Longchenpa, Tertön | Wrote several texts on Dzogchen and Buddhist philosophy |
| Orgyen Lingpa | 1323 – c. 1360 | o rgyan gling pa | Tertön | - |
| Rolpe Dorje | 1340–1383 | rol pa'i rdo rje | 4th Karmapa | Wrote many dohas |
| Tsongkhapa | 1357–1419 | tsong kha pa | 1st Ganden Tripa | Reformer of Tibetan Buddhism, founder of the New Kadampa, Gelug |
| Gyaltsab Je | 1364–1432 | rgyal tshab rje | Gyaltsab Dharma Rinchen, 2nd Ganden Tripa | Wrote a well-known commentary on Shantideva's Bodhicaryavatara |
| Khedrup Je | 1385–1438 | mkhas grub rje | 3rd Ganden Tripa, 1st Panchen Lama | - |
| Gendun Drub | 1391–1474 | dge 'dun grub pa | 1st Dalai Lama | Among other works, Training the Mind in the Great Way |
| Gö Lotsawa Zhönnu-pel | 1392–1481 | 'gos lo tsa ba gzhon nu dpal | - | Author of the Blue Annals |

== 15th century ==
| Name | Dates | Wylie transliteration | Other names | Notes |
|---|---|---|---|---|
| Gorampa Sönam Senge | 1429–1489 | go rams pa bsod nams seng ge | - | - |
| Pema Lingpa | 1450–1521 | padma gling pa | Tertön | - |
| Chödrak Gyatso | 1454–1506 | chos grags rgya mtsho | 7th Karmapa | Commentary on Abhisamayalamkara (Mahayana sutras), and The Ocean of Reasoning, a commentary on Pramana literature |
| Gendun Gyatso | 1475–1542 | dge 'dun rgya mtsho | 2nd Dalai Lama | Mystical verse and visions |
| Ngorchen Konchog Lhundrup | 1497–1557 | ngor chen dkon mchog lhun grub | 10th Abbot of Ngor Monastery | Author of Three Visions (foundational work of Sakya) |

== 16th century ==
| Name | Dates | Wylie transliteration | Other names | Notes |
|---|---|---|---|---|
| Mikyö Dorje | 1507–1554 | mi bskyod rdo rje | 8th Karmapa | Many works on Sutrayana, instructions on tantra |
| Pema Karpo | 1527–1592 | padma dkar po | - | Master of the Drukpa Kagyü |
| Sonam Gyatso | 1543–1588 | bsod nams rgya mtsho | 3rd Dalai Lama | Stages of the Path: Refined Gold, Lamrim |
| Wangchuk Dorje | 1556–1603 | dbang phyug rdo rje | 9th Karmapa | Wrote three Mahamudra texts |
| Lobsang Chökyi Gyaltsen | 1570–1662 | blo bzang chos kyi rgyal mtshan | 4th Panchen Lama | Wrote a famous lamrim |
| Taranatha | 1575–1634 | tA ra nA tha | Jonang | Historian of Indian Buddhism and author of Five Teachings of Maitreya |

== 17th century ==
| Name | Dates | Wylie transliteration | Other names | Notes |
|---|---|---|---|---|
| Kelden Gyatso | 1607–1677 | skal ldan rgya mtsho | Kelden Repa | "Mgur Bum", poetry and songs in the style of Milarepa |
| Tsele Natsok Rangdröl | 1608–? | rtse le sna tshogs rang grol | Tsele Gotsangpa | - |
| Ngawang Lobsang Gyatso | 1617–1682 | ngag dbang blo bzang rgya mtsho | 5th Dalai Lama | Twenty-five Sealed Teachings |
| Desi Sangye Gyatso | 1653–1705 | sangs rgyas rgya mtsho | Desi | Wrote Vaidurya-Karpo and Vaidurya sNgon-po |
| Tsangyang Gyatso | 1682–1706 | tshangs dbyangs rgya mtsho | 6th Dalai Lama | Many great poems with often worldly subjects are ascribed to him |

== 18th century ==
| Name | Dates | Wylie transliteration | Other names | Notes |
|---|---|---|---|---|
| Chokyi Jungne, Situ Panchen | 1700–1774 | chos kyi 'byung gnas | 8th Tai Situpa | Grammarian |
| Kelsang Gyatso | 1708–1757 | skal bzang rgya mtsho | 7th Dalai Lama | Explication of the Mandala rituals of Vajra Akshobhya Guhyasamaja |
| Jigme Lingpa | 1729–1798 | 'jigs med gling pa | Rigzin, Tertön | - |
| Jamphel Gyatso | 1758–1804 | 'jam dpal rgya mtsho | 8th Dalai Lama | - |
| Getse Mahapandita | 1761–1829 | dge rtse pan chen | Tsewang Chokdrub | - |
| Palden Tenpai Nyima | 1782–1853 | bstan pa'i nyi ma | 7th Panchen Lama | Author of Rinjung Lhantab |

== 19th century ==
| Name | Dates | Wylie transliteration | Other names | Notes |
|---|---|---|---|---|
| Jigme Chökyi Wangpo | 1808–1887 | 'jigs med chos kyi dbang po | Patrul Rinpoche | - |
| Jamgon Kongtrul Lodrö Thaye | 1813–1899 | 'jam mgon kong sprul blo gros mtha' yas | Padma Tennyi Yungdrung Lingpa | Treasury of Rediscovered Teachings |
| Jamyang Khyentse Wangpo | 1820–1892 | 'jam dbyangs mkhyen brtse’i dbang po | - | - |
| Chokgyur Lingpa | 1829–1870 | mchog gyur gling pa | Tertön | - |
| Dudjom Lingpa | 1835–1904 | bdud 'joms gling pa | Tertön | - |
| Jamgon Ju Mipham Gyatso | 1846–1912 | mi pham 'jam dbyangs rnam rgyal | Mipham Rinpoche | - |
| Shardza Tashi Gyaltsen | 1859–1935 | shar rdza bkra shis rgyal mtshan | - | See also Bön |
| Thubten Gyatso | 1876–1933 | thub bstan rgya mtsho | 13th Dalai Lama | - |
| Pabongkhapa Déchen Nyingpo | 1878–1941 | pha bong kha pa bde chen snying po | - | - |
| Jamyang Khyentse Chökyi Lodrö | 1893–1959 | 'jam dbyangs mkhyen brtse chos kyi blo gros | - | Rime movement |

== 20th century ==
| Name | Dates | Wylie transliteration | Other names | Notes |
|---|---|---|---|---|
| Lobsang Yeshe Tenzin Gyatso | 1901–1981 | blo bzang ye shes bstan 'dzin rgya mtsho | 3rd Trijang Rinpoche | Wrote on Gyallu |
| Gendün Chöpel | 1903–1951 | dge 'dun chos 'phel | - | Author of the White Annals and The Tibetan Art of Love |
| Jigdrel Yeshe Dorje | 1904–1987 | 'jigs bral ye shes rdo rje | 2nd Dudjom Rinpoche, 1st leader of the Nyingma | See also Terma |
| Karma Rangjung Kunchap | 1905–1989 | kar ma ran byung kun khyab | Kalu Rinpoche | Shangpa Kagyu |
| Liu Manqing | 1906–1941 | - | Yudhona, Yongjin, De Meixi | - |
| Tsepon W.D. Shakabpa | 1908–1989 | - | Tsepon Wangchuk Deden Shakabpa | Historian |
| Dilgo Khyentse | 1910–1991 | dil mgo mkhyen brtse | From 1987 to 1991, led the Nyingma School | - |
| Chatral Sangye Dorje | 1913–2015 | bya bral sangs rgyas rdo rje | Chatral Rinpoche | - |
| Geshe Rabten | 1920–1986 | dge bshes rab brtan | - | Author on Buddhism |
| Tulku Urgyen Rinpoche | 1920–1996 | sprul sku o rgyan | - | - |
| Thubten Jigme Norbu | 1922–2008 | thub bstan 'jigs med nor bu | Taktser Rinpoche | - |
| Tenzin Choedrak | 1922–2001 | bstan 'dzin chos grags | - | Former doctor of the 14th Dalai Lama |
| Khenpo Karthar Rinpoche | 1924–2019 | - | Abt des Karma Triyana Dharmachakra | - |
| Lopön Tenzin Namdak | 1926–2025 | bstan 'dzin rnam-dag | Lopön | See also Bön |
| Lobsang Gyatso (monk) | 1928–1997 | blo bzang rgya mtsho | Geshe | Founder of the Institute of Buddhist Dialectics Dharmshala, murdered in 1997 |
| Chagdud Tulku Rinpoche | 1930–2002 | - | Rinpoche | - |
| Kelsang Gyatso | 1931–2022 | bskal bzang rgya mtsho | Geshe | Founder of the New Kadampa Tradition |
| Thinley Norbu | 1931–2011 | phrin las nor bu | Dungsé Thinley Norbu Rinpoche | son of Jigdrel Yeshe Dorje, 2nd Dudjom Rinpoche |
| Nyoshul Khen Rinpoche | 1932–1999 | - | Nyoshul Khenpo | - |
| Ani Pachen | 1933–2002 | - | - | Autobiography |
| 9th Thrangu Rinpoche | 1933–2023 | - | Khenchen | - |
| Palden Gyatso | 1933–2018 | dpal ldan rgya mtsho | - | Autobiography |
| Tarthang Tulku | born 1934 | - | - | - |
| Tenzin Gyatso | born 1935 | bstan 'dzin rgya mtsho | 14th Dalai Lama, Geshe | Wide range of works on Buddhism |
| Thubten Yeshe | 1935–1984 | thub bstan ye shes | - | Founder of the FPMT |
| Tashi Tsering | born 1937 | bkra shis tshe ring | Geshe | - |
| Namkhai Norbu | 1938–2018 | nam mkha'i nor bu | Chögyal | Writings on Dzogchen |
| Lobsang Tenzin | born 1937 | blo bzang bstan 'dzin | 5th Samdhong Rinpoche, Kalon Tripa of the 13th Kashag of the Tibetan government-in-exile | |
| Akong Rinpoche | 1939–2013 | - | - | - |
| Loden Sherab Dagyab | born 1940 | - | - | - |
| Bokar Rinpoche | 1940–2004 | - | - | Contributions on Bardo |
| Chögyam Trungpa | 1940–1987 | chos rgya drung pa | 11th Trungpa Tulku from Surmang | - |
| Khenchen Palden Sherab | 1941–2010 | mkhan chen dpal ldan shes rab | - | Several Nyingma translations in English |
| Thubten Zopa Rinpoche | 1945–2023 | - | Lama | Founder of the FPMT |
| Sogyal Rinpoche | 1947–2019 | bsod rgyal rin po che | - | Author of The Tibetan Book of Living and Dying |
| Chökyi Nyima Rinpoche | born 1951 | chos kyi nyi ma | - | Son of Tulku Urgyen, contributions on Bardo |
| Mipham Chökyi Lodrö | 1952–2014 | mi pham chos kyi blo gros | 14th Shamarpa | - |
| Dhondup Gyal | 1953–1985 | don grub rgyal | - | A founder of modern Tibetan literature |
| Tashi Tsering (London) | born 1958 | bkra shis tshe ring | Geshe | - |
| Alai (author) | born 1959 | - | - | Chinese writer |
| Tashi Dawa | born 1959 | bkra shis zla ba | - | Author of A Soul Knotted on a Leather Thong |
| Khyentse Norbu | born 1961 | mkhyen brtse nor bu | Dzongsar Jamyang Khyentse | - |
| Tenzin Wangyal | born 1961 | bstan 'dzin dbang rgyal | - | See also Bön |
| Sakyong Mipham | born 1962 | - | - | Son of Chögyam Trungpa |
| Sungrap Ngedon Tenpa Gyaltsen | born 1965 | - | 7th Dzogchen Ponlop Rinpoche, Abbot of Dzogchen Monastery | - |
| Ngawang Tsoknyi Gyatso | born 1966 | ngag dbang tshogs gnyis rgya mtsho | 3rd Tsoknyi Rinpoche | Son of Tulku Urgyen |
| Tsering Woeser | born 1966 | - | - | - |
| Khandro Rinpoche | born 1967 | mkha' 'gro rin po che | - | Daughter of Trichen Jurme Kunzang Wangyal |
| Hortsang Jigme | born 1967 | Hor-gtsang-'jigs-med | - | - |
| Tsering Wangmo Dhompa | born 1969 | tshe ring dbang mo sdom pa | - | Female poet |
| Tenzin Tsundue | born 1975 | - | - | - |
| 7th Yongey Mingyur | born 1975 | yongs dge mi 'gyur | Dorje Rinpoche | Youngest son of Tulku Urgyen |

=== 20th century (cont. alphabetically) ===
| Name | Dates | Wylie transliteration | Other names | Notes |
|---|---|---|---|---|
| Jamyang Norbu | - | 'jam dbyangs nor bu | - | - |
| Tsering Döndrub | - | tshe ring don grub | Ancestor, ra lo | Novelist |
| Tsering Namgyal | - | tshe ring rnam rgyal | - | Writer of Little Lhasa and other different articles in various newspaper |
| Tsering Shakya | - | tshe ring sha kya | Tsering Wangdu Shakya | Historian |
| Tsoltim Ngima Shakabpa | - | - | - | poet and writer |

== Foreign writers with Tibetan names ==
| Name | Dates | Wylie transliteration | Original name | Notes |
|---|---|---|---|---|
| Erik Pema Kunsang | - | Erik pad ma kun bzang | Erik Hein Schmidt | Translator and author, founder of Rangjung Yeshe Translations and Publications |
| Jetsunma Ahkon Lhamo | born 1939 | - | Alyce Zeoli | Enthroned 1988, Palyul |
| Lama Chökyi Nyima | - | bla ma chos kyi nyi ma | Richard Barron | - |
| Pema Chödrön | born 1936 | pad ma chos sgron | Deirdre Blomfield-Brown | - |
| Gyurme Dorje | - | 'gyur med rdo rje | - | - |
| Geshe Ngawang Wangyal | 1901–1983 | ngag dbang dbang rgyal | - | - |
| Thubten Chodron | born 1950 | thub bstan chos sgron | Cherry Greene | - |
| Tsultrim Allione | born 1947 | tshul khrims Allione | Joan Rousmanière Ewing | - |

== See also ==
- Derge Parkhang
- Sa'gya library
