= Sorig Zhiney and Luejong =

Mindfulness and yoga practice

Sorig Zhiney and Luejong (Dzongkha: སོ་རིག་ཞི་གནས་དང་ལུས་སྦྱོང་།; romanized: so rig zhe gnas dang lus sbyong) is a mindfulness and yoga practice, purely based on Bhutanese traditional medicine system, also known as "Sowa Rigpa", the ancient science of healing.

It is designed to improve the function of the sensory organs and inner organs, balance the internal energy, open the channels and relax the mind.

== Etymology ==
Sorig Zhiney and Luejong was derived from the Bhutanese traditional medicine system, also known as Sowa Rigpa. Sorig (or sowa rigpa) refers to the science of healing that has been in practice in Bhutan since time immemorial. The term Zhiney is a meditation practice in Sowa Rigpa, the science of healing, while Luejong literally translates to physical exercises in the Dzongkha language.

== Definition ==
Sorig Zhiney and Luejong is a mindfulness and yoga practice, based on Sowa Rigpa, the Bhutanese Traditional Medicine System.

== History ==
Sorig Zhiney was introduced by a twelfth-century physician, Yuthok Yontan Gonpo the Younger, the "Father of Tibetan Medicine". Sorig Zhiney and Luejong was derived from the Mepham Nampar Gyalwai Kabum, Yuthok Nyingthig Tsalung Thruelkor and Sorig Nyingnor Chigdue text of the Medicinal Buddha.

== Introduction in Bhutan ==
Sorig Zhiney and Luejong was introduced as part of the wellness and spiritual health promotion program in 2017 to help build a healthy and happy society, consistent with Bhutan's vision of Gross National Happiness, and the mission and vision of the Ministry of Health (Bhutan).

The Department of Traditional Medicine Services (DTMS), in collaboration with the Royal Civil Service Commission, organised Sorig Zhiney and Luejong to promote the mental and physical well-being of civil servants. The training was also organised for persons with disabilities by the department in collaboration with the Disabled People's Organization of Bhutan.

Sorig Zhiney and Luejong is also gaining popularity in schools. The National Traditional Medicine Hospital is planning to implement the practice in all schools across the country.

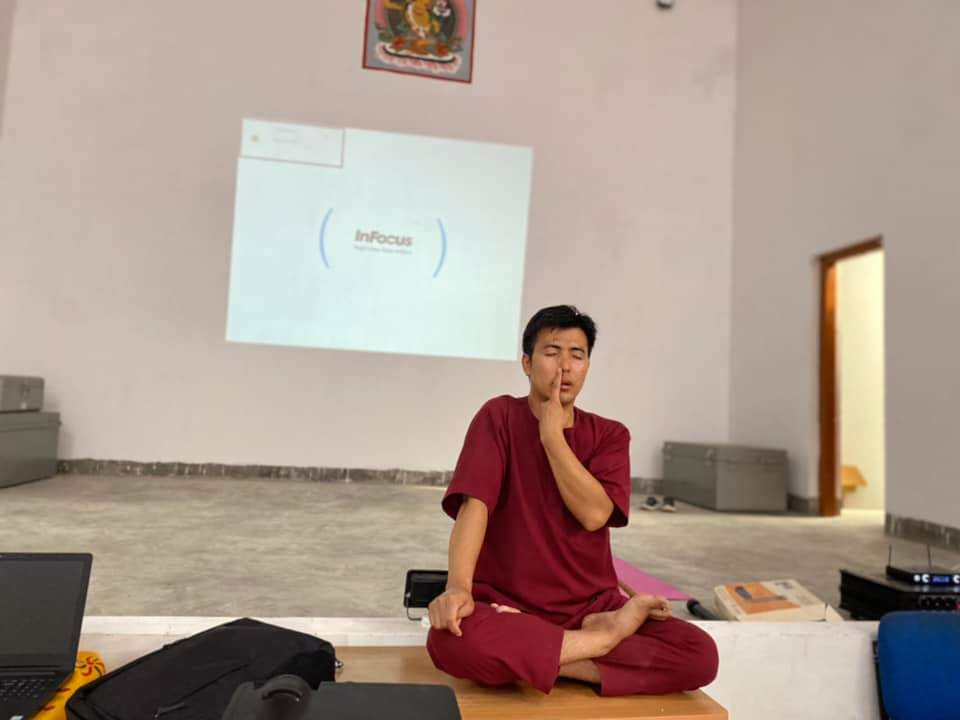

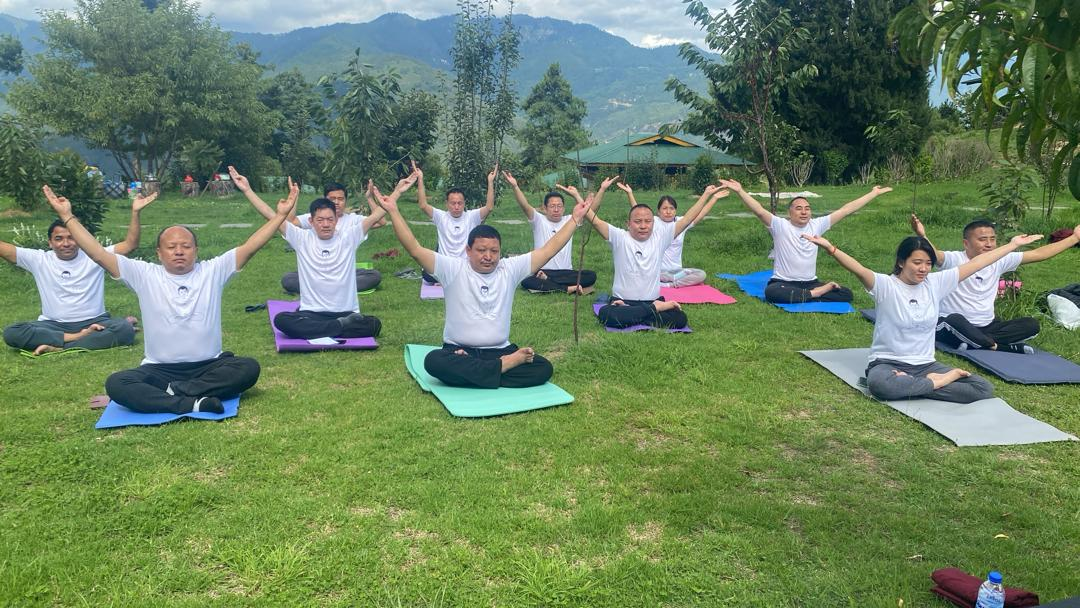

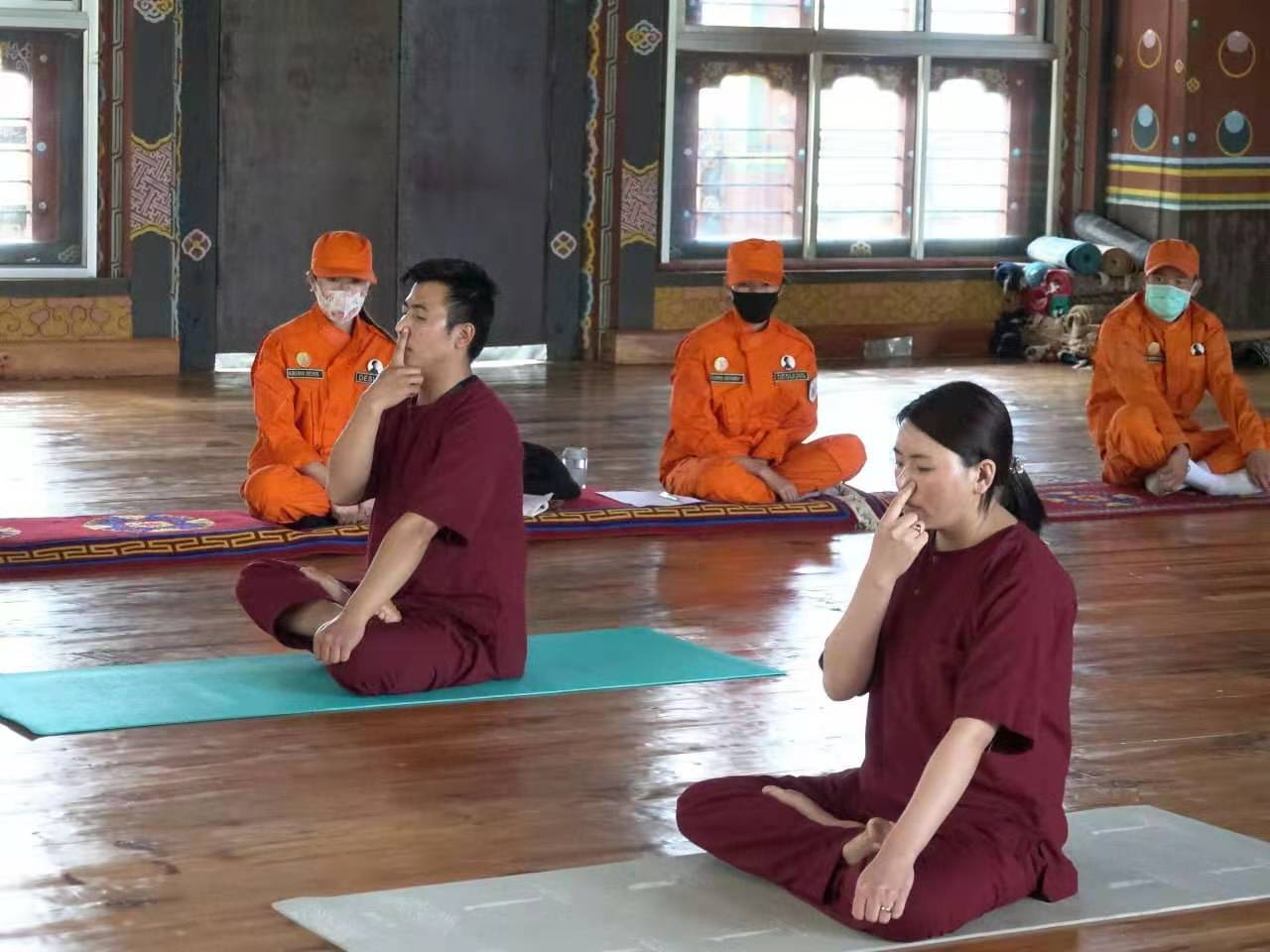

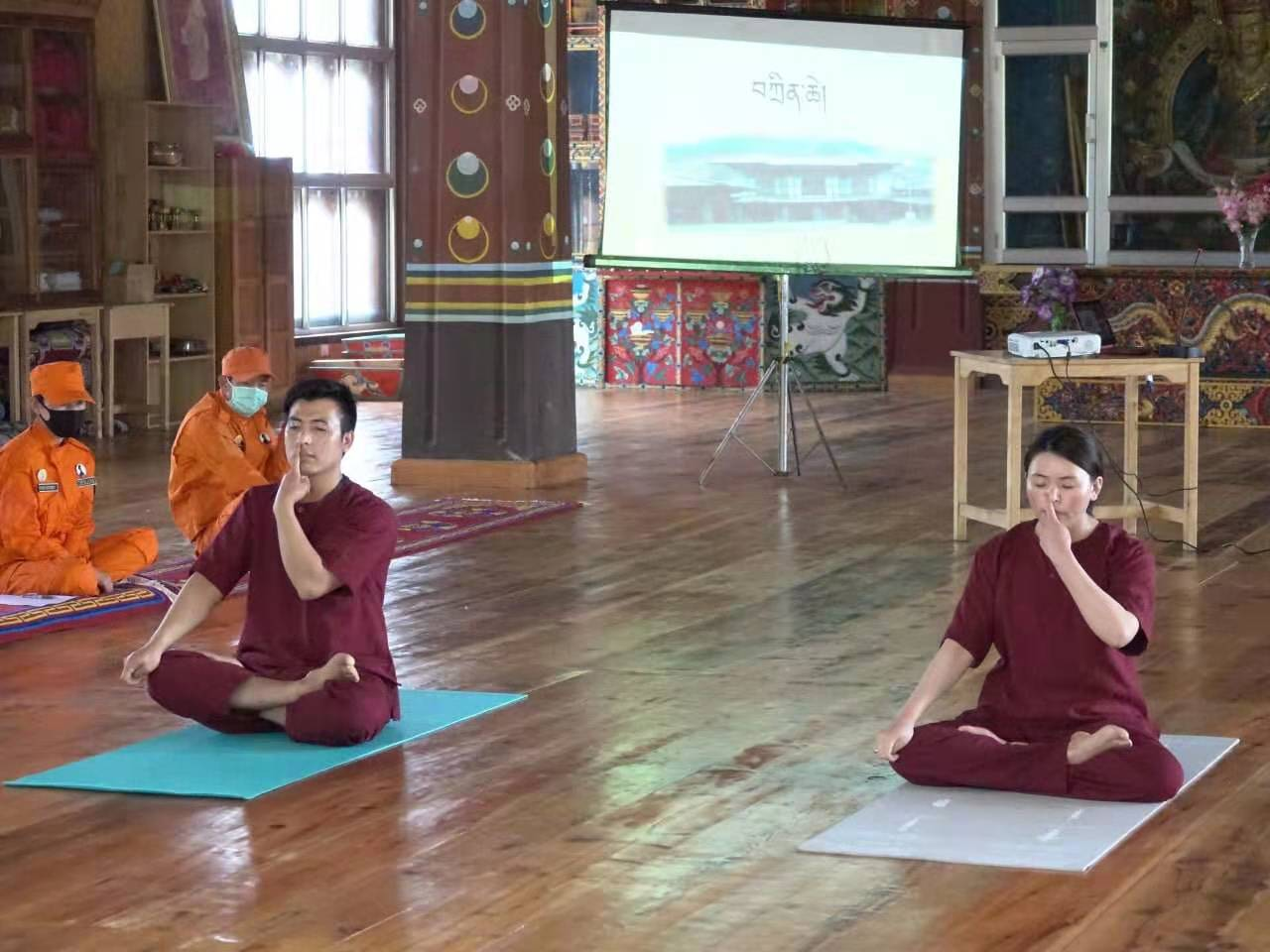

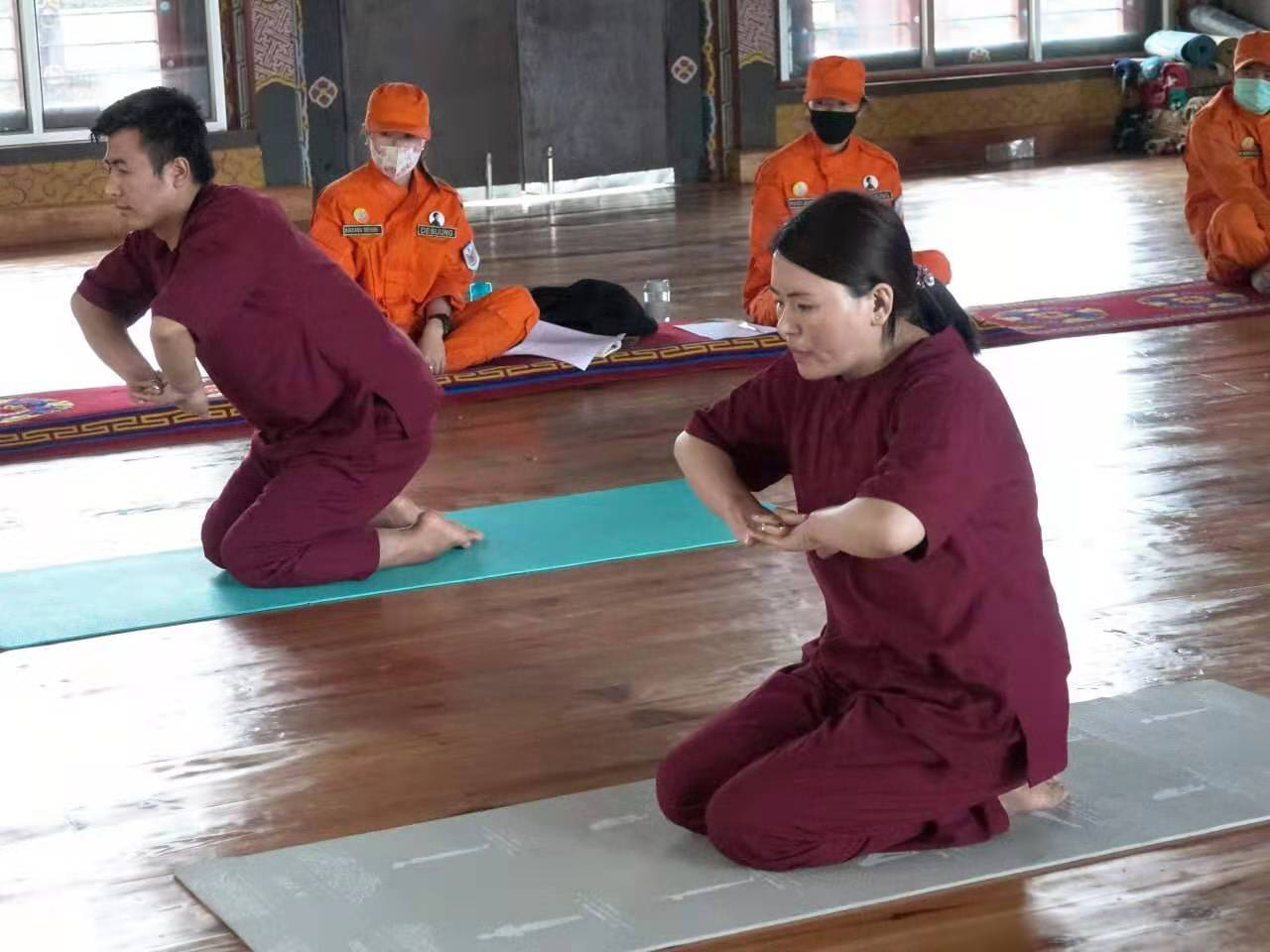

== Technique ==
Sorig Zhiney and Luejong comprise 32 exercises which are classified into three main categories: Semkham Luejong (for mental health), Minarwa Neypai Luejong (for healthy living) and Neyzhi Selthap Luejong (for physical ailments).
