= Khangmar Monastery =

Tibetan Buddhist monastery in Sichuan, China

Religion
- Affiliation: Tibetan Buddhism
- Sect: Gelugpa

Location
- Location: Garzê County, Garzê Tibetan Autonomous Prefecture, Sichuan
- Country: China
- Interactive map of Khangmar Monastery

Khangmar Monastery or Kangma Monastery (Tibetan: ཁང་དམར་དགོན་གསར, Wylie: khang dmar dgon gsar; Chinese: 康猫寺) is a Gelugpa establishment to the southeast of Kandze Town (Ch. Garze), capital Kandze County in Sichuan province, China. There are several other monasteries along the Yalong River including the Gelugpa Drakar, Nyatso, and Tsitso monasteries as well as the Sakya Dontok and the Kagyu Rirak Gonpas.

There were 350 monks at Khangar Monastery in 1953 when Geshe Tashi Tsering (Chenrezig Institute) left to study at the Sera Monastery in Lhasa. He later fled to India and has been the resident teacher at the Chenrezig Institute in Queensland since 1990.

The monastery was closed during the Cultural Revolution for 25 years but was re-established in 1984 and now has about 70 monks.

The upper storeys of the main monastery have collapsed through neglect during the period it was abandoned and the main temple, assembly hall, kitchen and administrative areas are unstable and dangerous but still in use.

The Jhilu Ritrek Nunnery was established close to Khangmar when it was reopened in 1984. There are about a dozen nuns living there now.
