= Lalitasana =

Seated pose with one leg hanging down in Indian art and religion

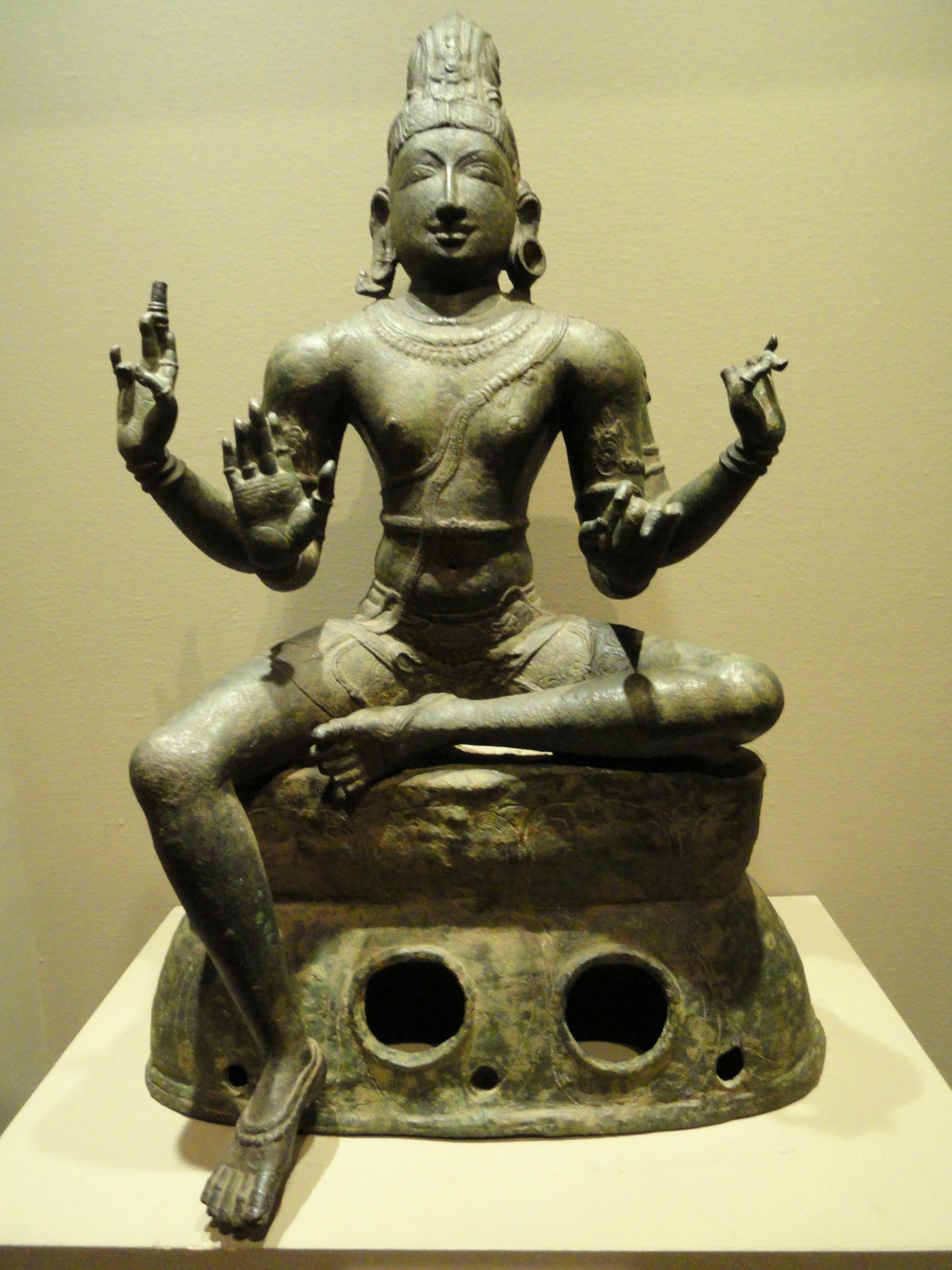
Shiva, Chola bronze, 12th-century

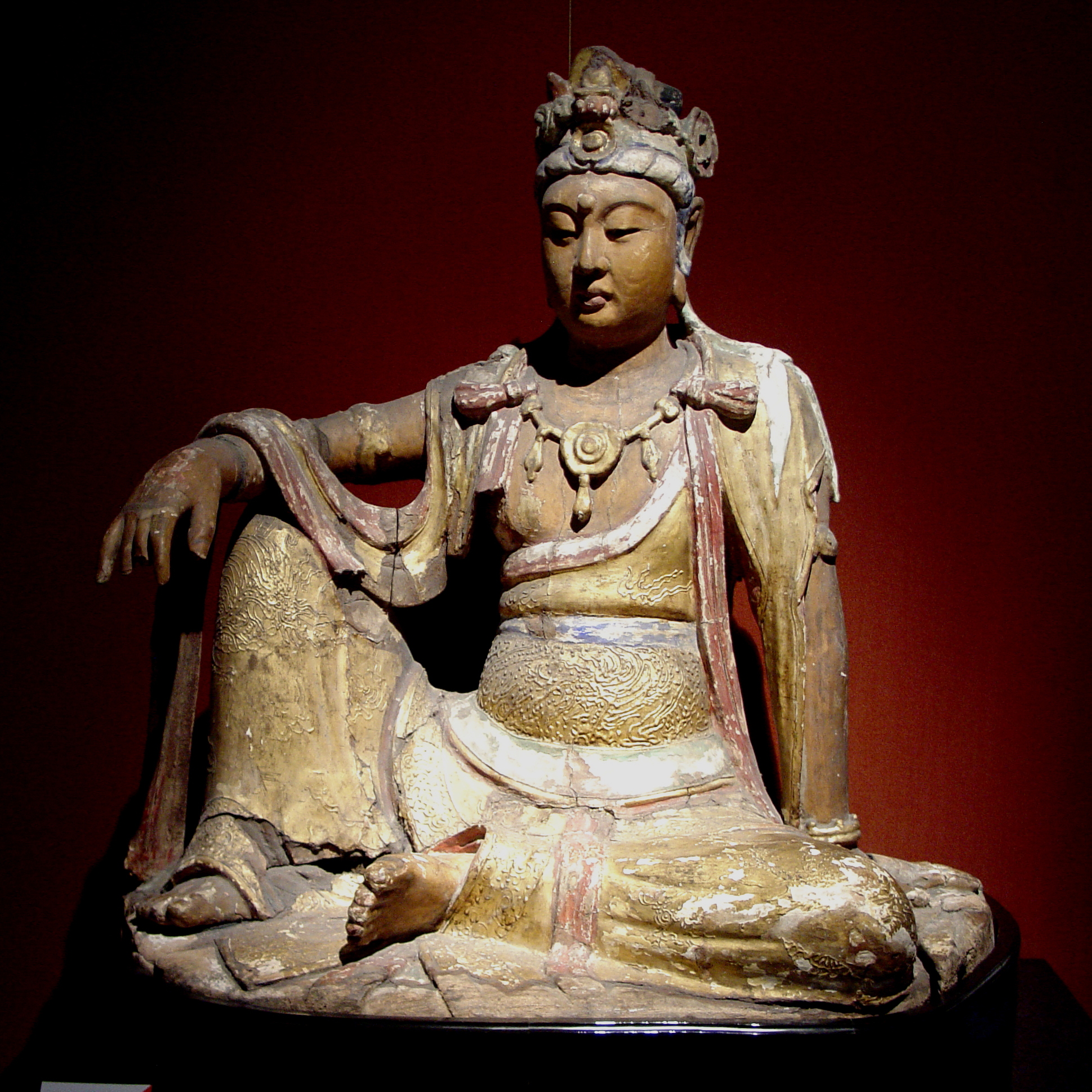
Chinese wooden Guanyin in "royal ease" pose, Song dynasty

Lalitasana (Sakata: lalitāsana) is a pose or mudra in Indian art and the art of dharmic religions in other countries. It is often called "the royal position" or "royal ease" in English, and is a relaxed pose typical in royal portraits and those of religious figures whose "kingly" attributes are being emphasized. The figure sits on a throne with one leg tucked inwards on the seat and the other hanging down ("pendent") to touch the ground or rest on a support (often a stylized lotus throne). Usually it is the proper right leg that dangles, but the reversed image can be found. Bare feet are normal. Asana is a general term for a seated pose, from Sanskrit: आसन āsana "sitting down" (from आस ās "to sit down"), a sitting posture, a seat.

Some sources distinguish between the lalitasana posture, as described above, and the "royal ease" (maharajalilasana or rajalilasana), where the right leg (usually) is bent, and the foot rests on the same level as the sitting body, and the extended arm is placed on the raised knee. With all variants the technical phrasing describes a figure as being "in" the pose: "seated in lalitasana". Other sources regard the two as synonymous.

The pose with an arm resting on a raised knee is especially seen in Chinese Buddhist art, for bodhisattva images, but is found in Indian art from at least the 8th century, with one famous example from the Ajanta Caves (the Naga-king illustrated below) probably dating to around 478. It became associated in China with Guanyin from the late 9th century. In many Chinese lalitasana postures, especially for Maitreya, the tucked-in leg rests on the other thigh, which is generally not seen in Indian art.

== Details ==
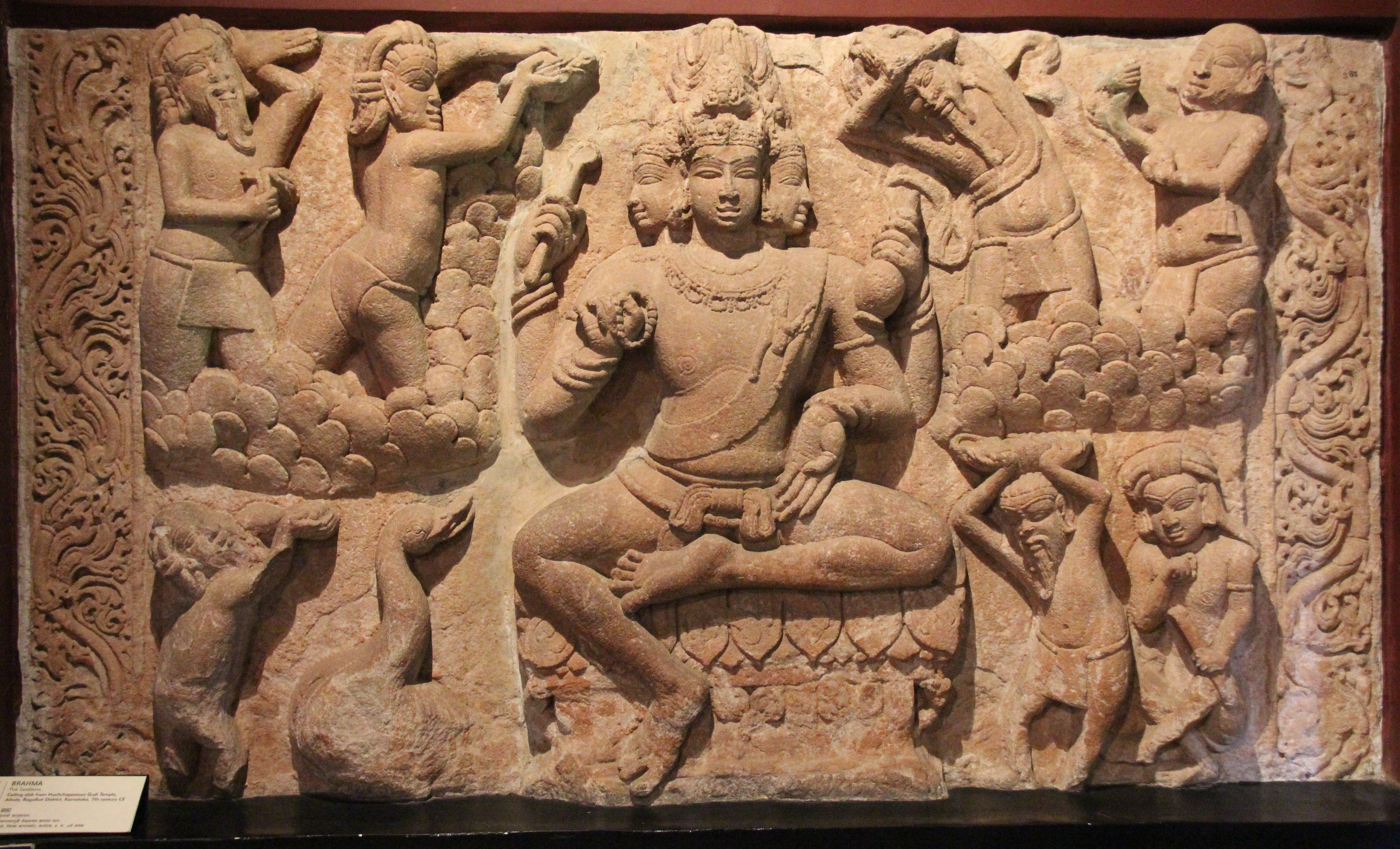
Brahma, 7th-century, Aihole

Very often the proper left hand holds a lotus flower, and the right foot may rest on another one. The dangling foot often rests on something, whether a lotus flower, or the figure's vahana or "vehicle", the animal that is also an identifying attribute, or a vase. As the pose emphasizes the royal aspect of the figure, they will very often wear a high Indian crown. In Indian art, especially ancient and medieval, the pose is often used for female figures, but in the art of Java these are very rare, and restricted to figures closely following Indian models. This restriction may well be because the normal female dress (though not worn by deities in art) made the pose impossible for women.

The pose with the proper left leg pendent is technically savya-lalitasana or sukhasana, and with the right leg pendent vama-lalitasana.

== History ==
The pose is typical in depictions of kings, and sometimes queens and court notables, in early Buddhist sculpture (broadly dating from c. 100 BCE to 200 CE) from sites such as Sanchi, Bharhut and Amaravati. Mostly these show scenes from the life or earlier lives of the Buddha, but there are other secular scenes.

The pose is found for religious figures from Kushan art (1st to 4th century CE) from Gandhara and Mathura, although at this period it is rare, with a larger number of seated Buddha images, many with crossed legs, a pose that disappears later. It becomes increasing popular in the Post-Gupta period of medieval India, and has remained so, being often used in contemporary Hindu imagery in particular.

== Figures commonly shown in lalitasana ==
=== Buddhist ===
In later periods, the pose is very common for bodhisattva images, and deities such as Tara, but rare for the Buddha himself, except as the "future Buddha" Maitreya. It is often seen depicting the pot-bellied god of wealth, Jambhala in Buddhism and Kubera to Hindus.

=== Hinduism ===
The pose is common for Brahma, Vishnu, Shiva and their consorts, from around the Gupta period onwards. Also the Matrikas, who are typically identified by their different animal supporters, and numerous other figures. As a distinctive regional feature, temples in Odisha in the classic Kaḷinga architectural style very often have a figure of Gajalaxmi in lalitasana as their lalatabimba or central protective image over the doorway to a temple or the sanctuary of one.

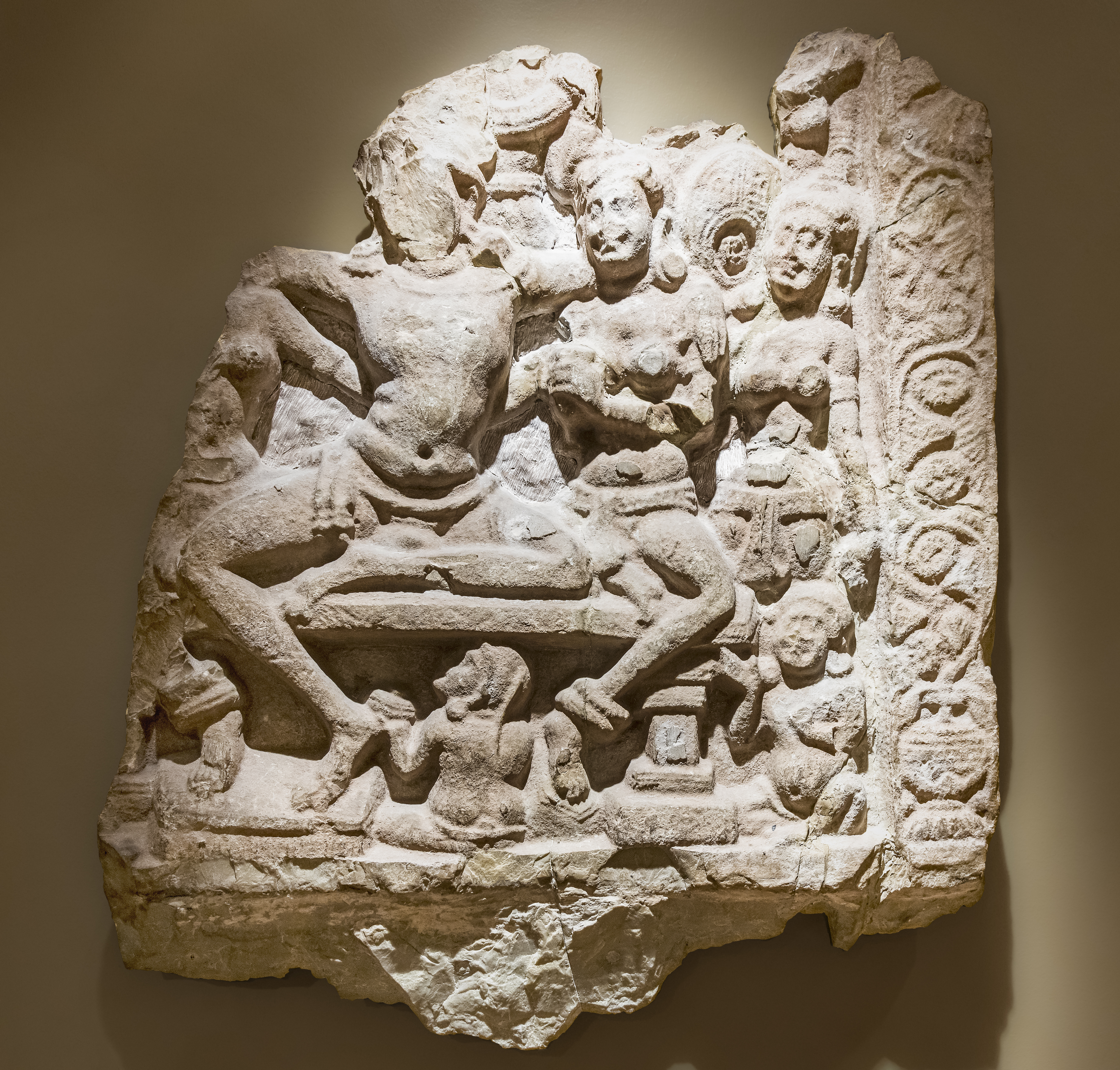
King and queen in Jataka scene of an earlier life of the Buddha, c. 200, from Ghantasala

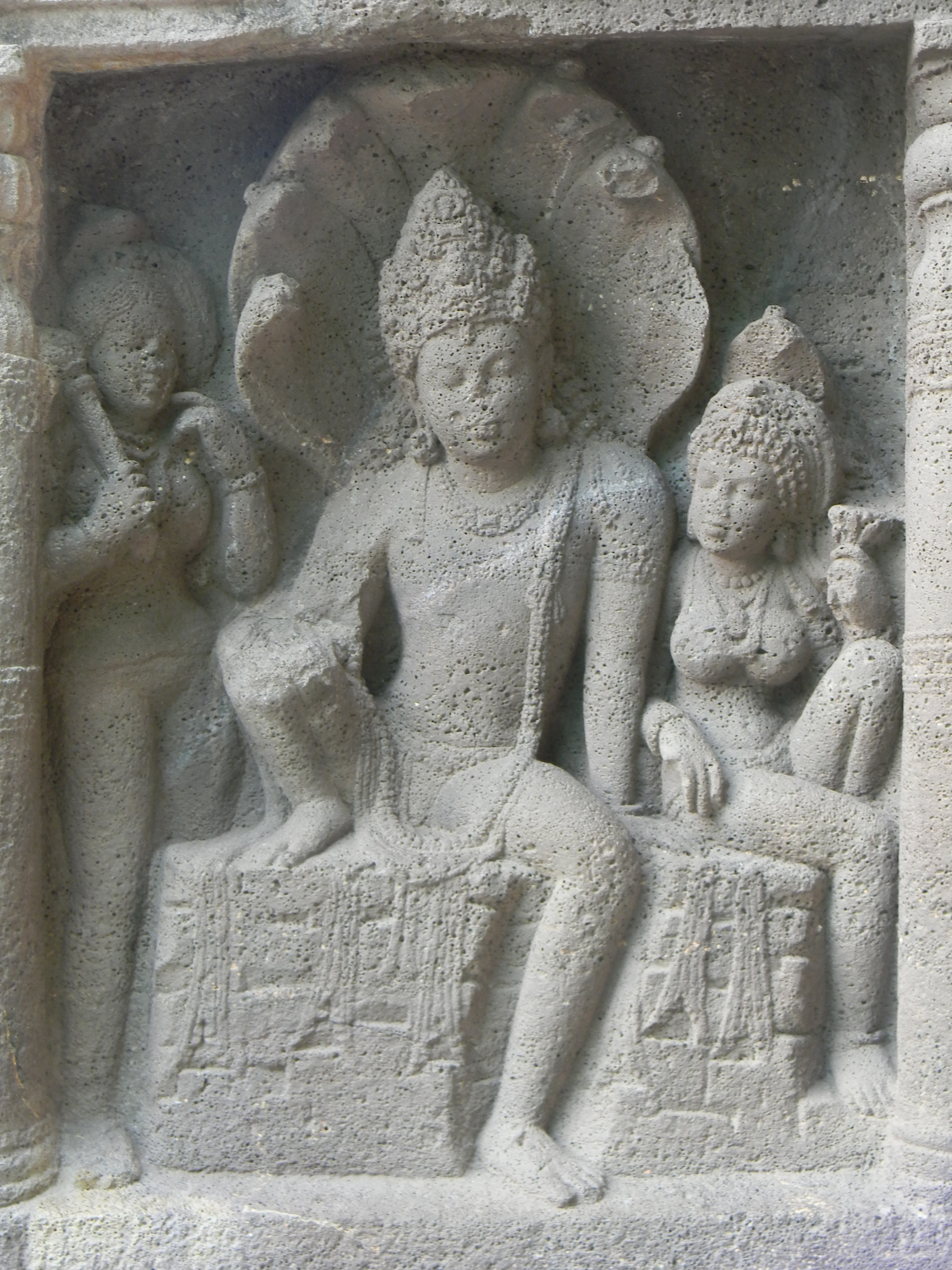
Naga-king and consort, Cave 19, Ajanta Caves, c. 478

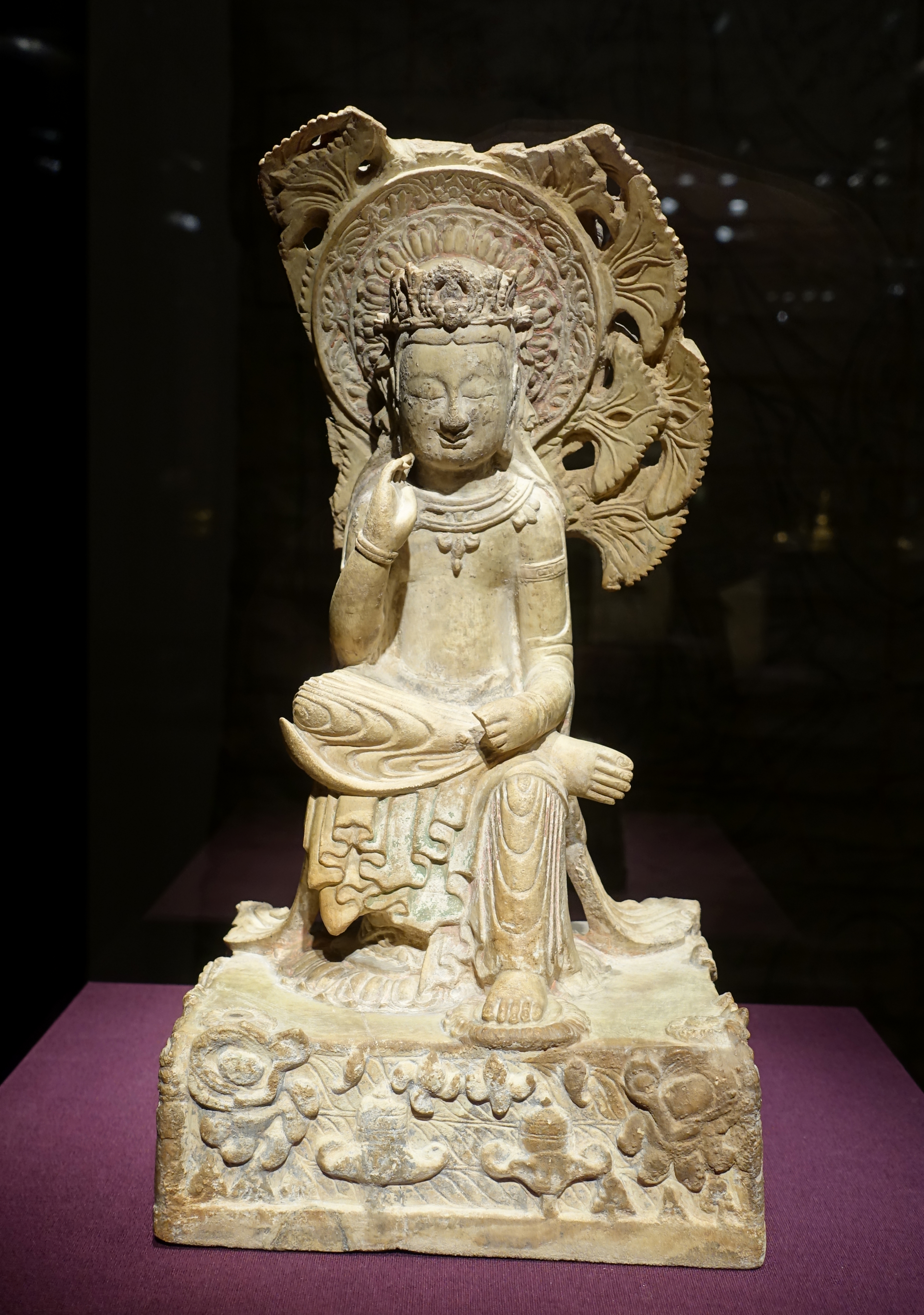
Maitreya, China, Hebei Province, Northern Qi dynasty, 550–577. The Chinese "contemplation posture" variant

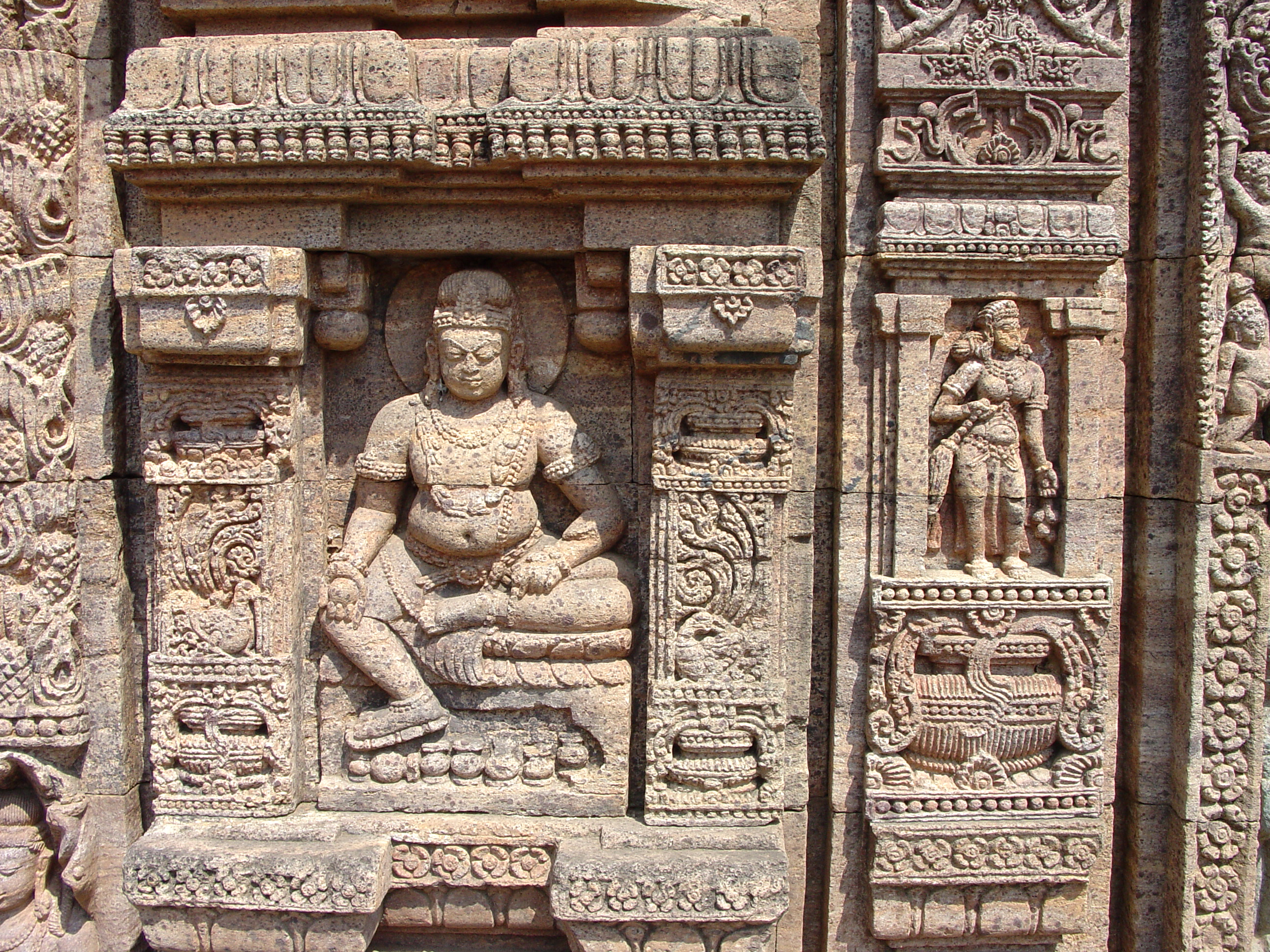
Buddhist Jambhala at Ratnagiri, Odisha, 8th-century

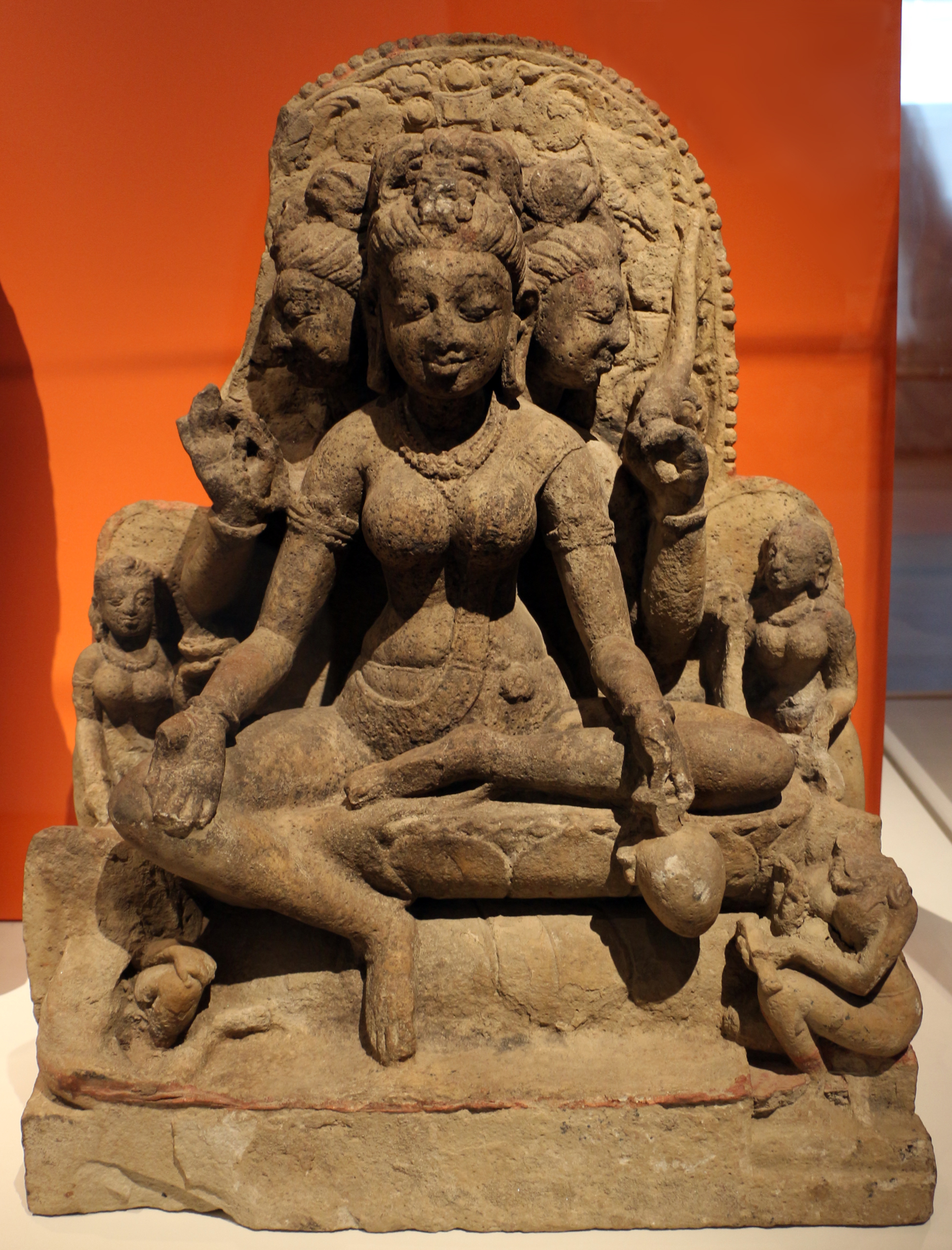
Matrika Brahmani sits in lalitasana, north India, 9th-century

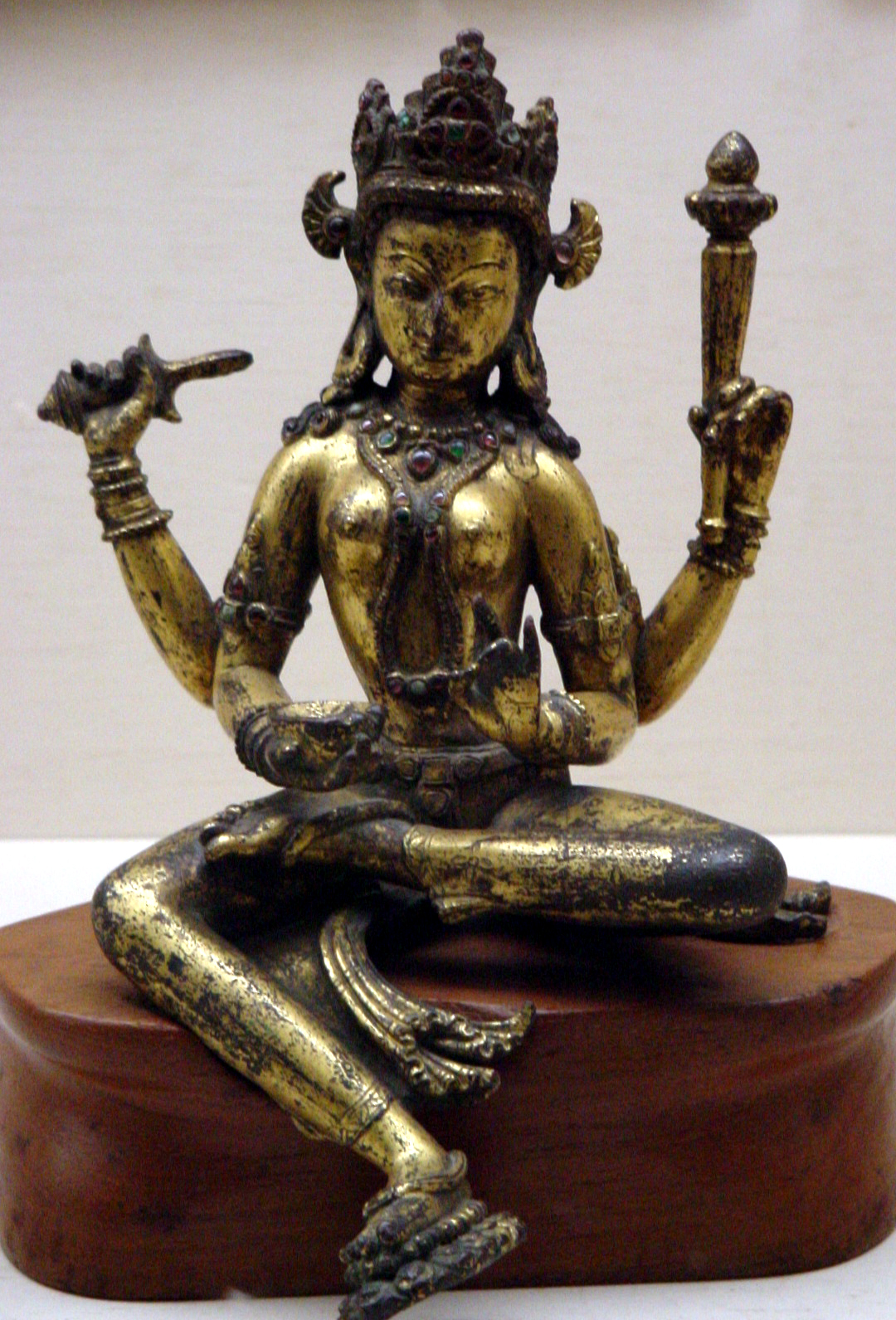
One of the Matrikas, Nepal, gilt-bronze, 14th century. The pendent foot "rests" on a small lotus throne, itself unsupported.

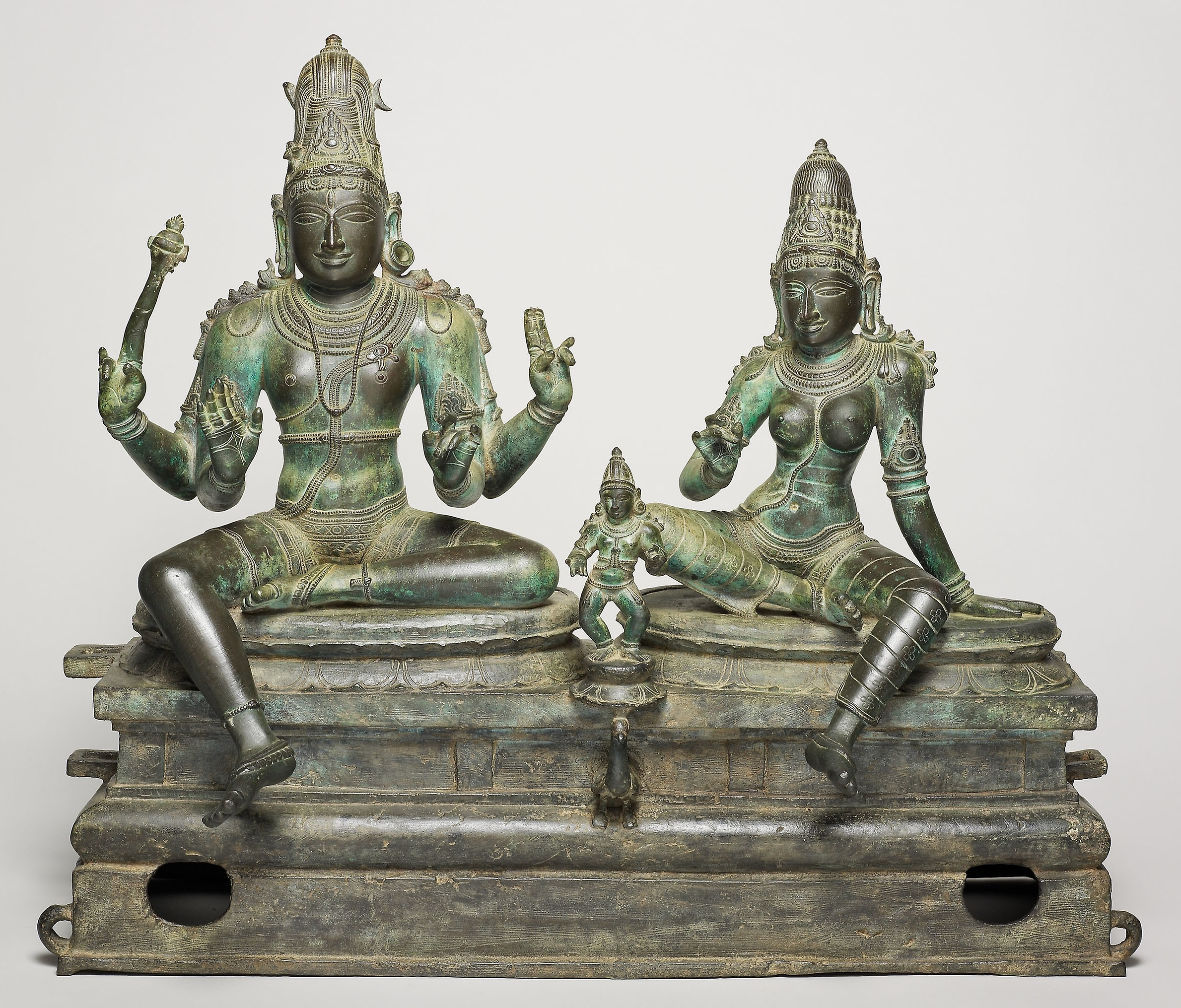
Shiva and Uma with different pendent legs, late Chola bronze, c. 1400

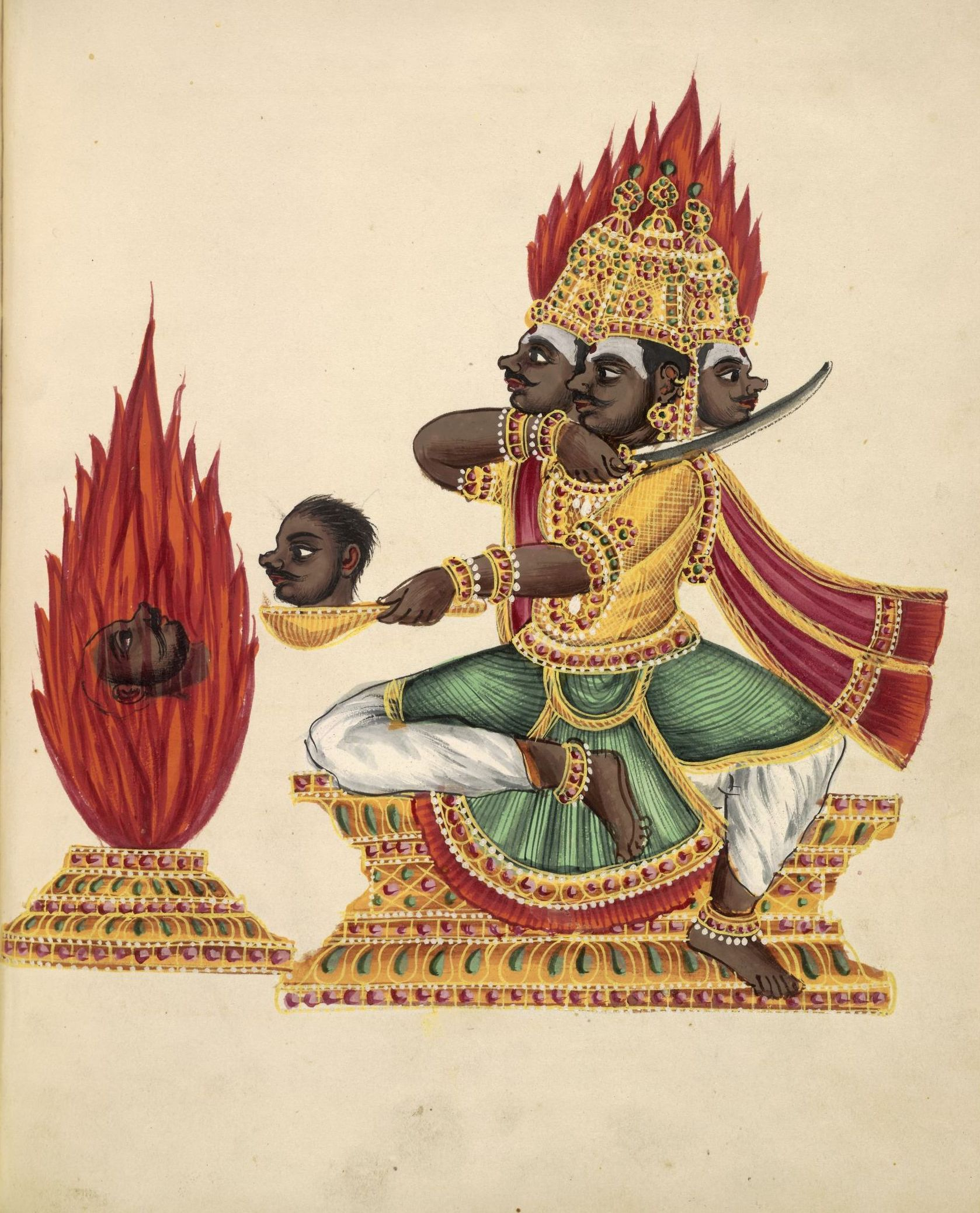
"The rakshasa king Ravana sits in lalitasana on a throne facing a fire altar in which he offers his severed head", British Museum, Company style, Tiruchirapalli, Tamil Nadu, c. 1830

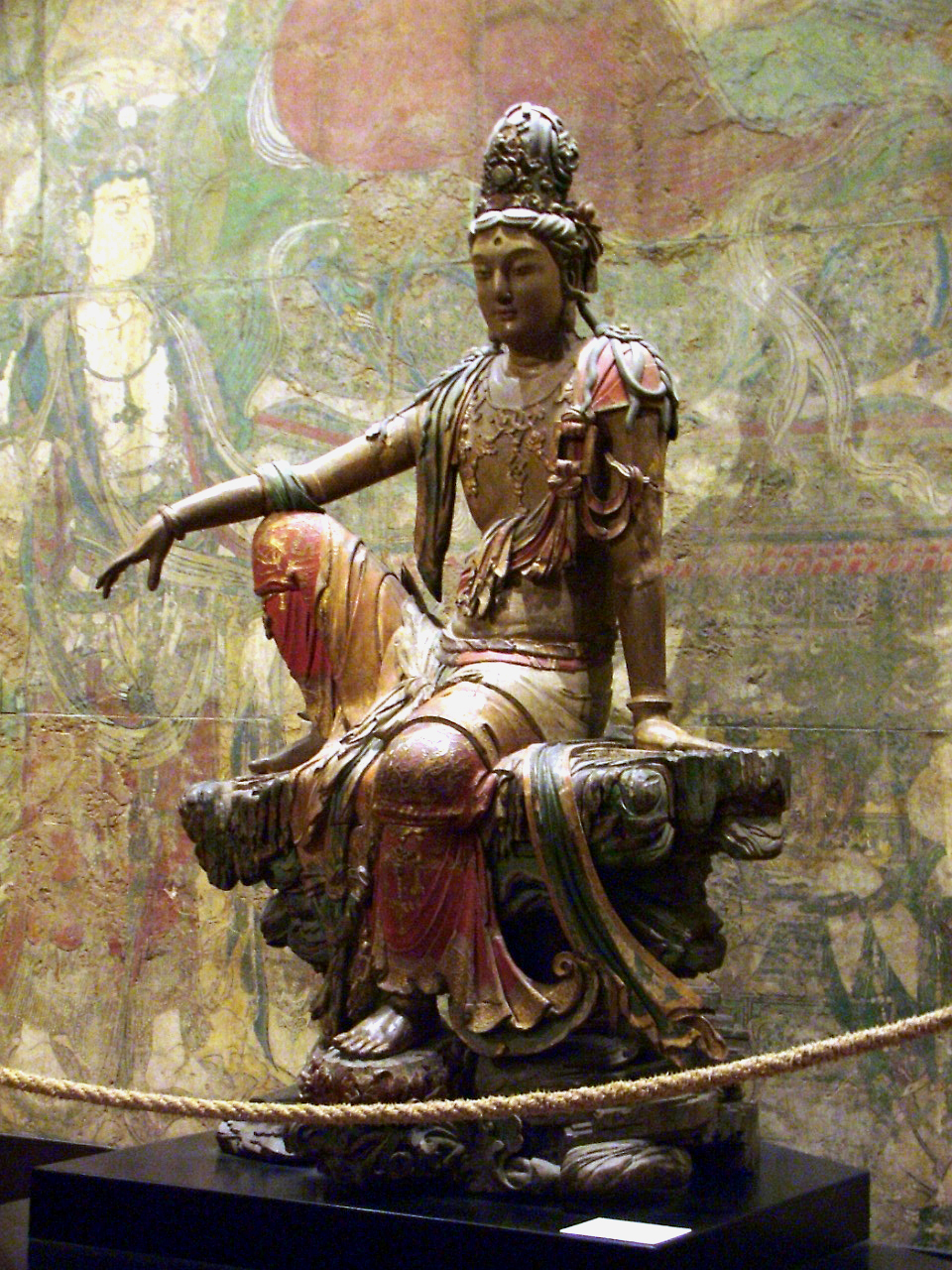
Bodhisattva Avalokitesvara (Guanshiyin), Shanxi Province, China. 11th-12th century CE. Liao dynasty (907-1125 CE). Nelson-Atkins Museum of Art.
