= Jambhala =

God of Wealth in Buddhism

Jambhala, also known as Dzambhala, Dzambala, Zambala or Jambala, is the Buddhist deity of fortune and wealth and a member of the Jewel Family. He is sometimes equated with the Hindu deity Kubera. Jambhala is also believed to be an emanation of Avalokitesvara or Chenrezig, the Bodhisattva of Compassion. There are five different wealth Jambhalas; each has his own practice and mantra to help eliminate poverty and create financial stability.

Gyalten Sogdzin Rinpoche said that Jambhala is the protector of all Lineages and of all sentient beings from all sickness and difficulties. Jambhala is a Bodhisattva of material and spiritual wealth as well as many other things, especially of granting financial stability.

Because in this world, there are all kinds of wrathful and negative emotions or bad spirits, and sometimes they will harm you and other sentient beings, Dzambhala must take on such a wrathful and powerful form to protect us from these harmful spirits and negative karma. Especially, Dzambhala helps us minimize or decrease all misfortunes and obstacles and helps us increase all good fortune and happiness.

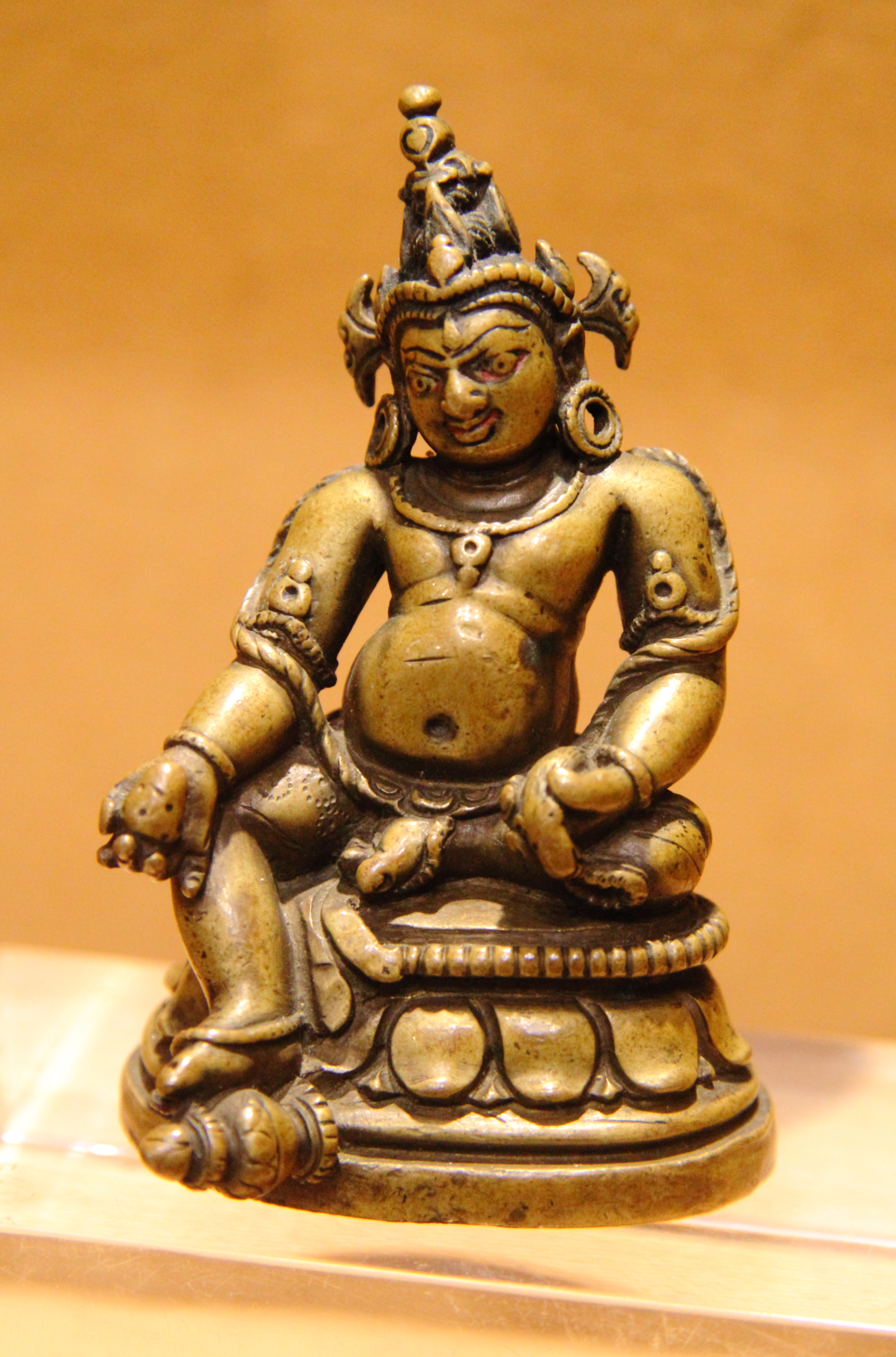
Bronze statuette of Jambhala, Pala Empire, 11th century A.D.

== Etymology ==
Dzam means "deity or gathering." Bhah means "gold or wealth." La means "to honor". Dzambhala means “Precious golden deity who gathers or brings the wealth of spirituality or Dharma and material security or accomplishment to our lives."

== Five Jambhalas ==
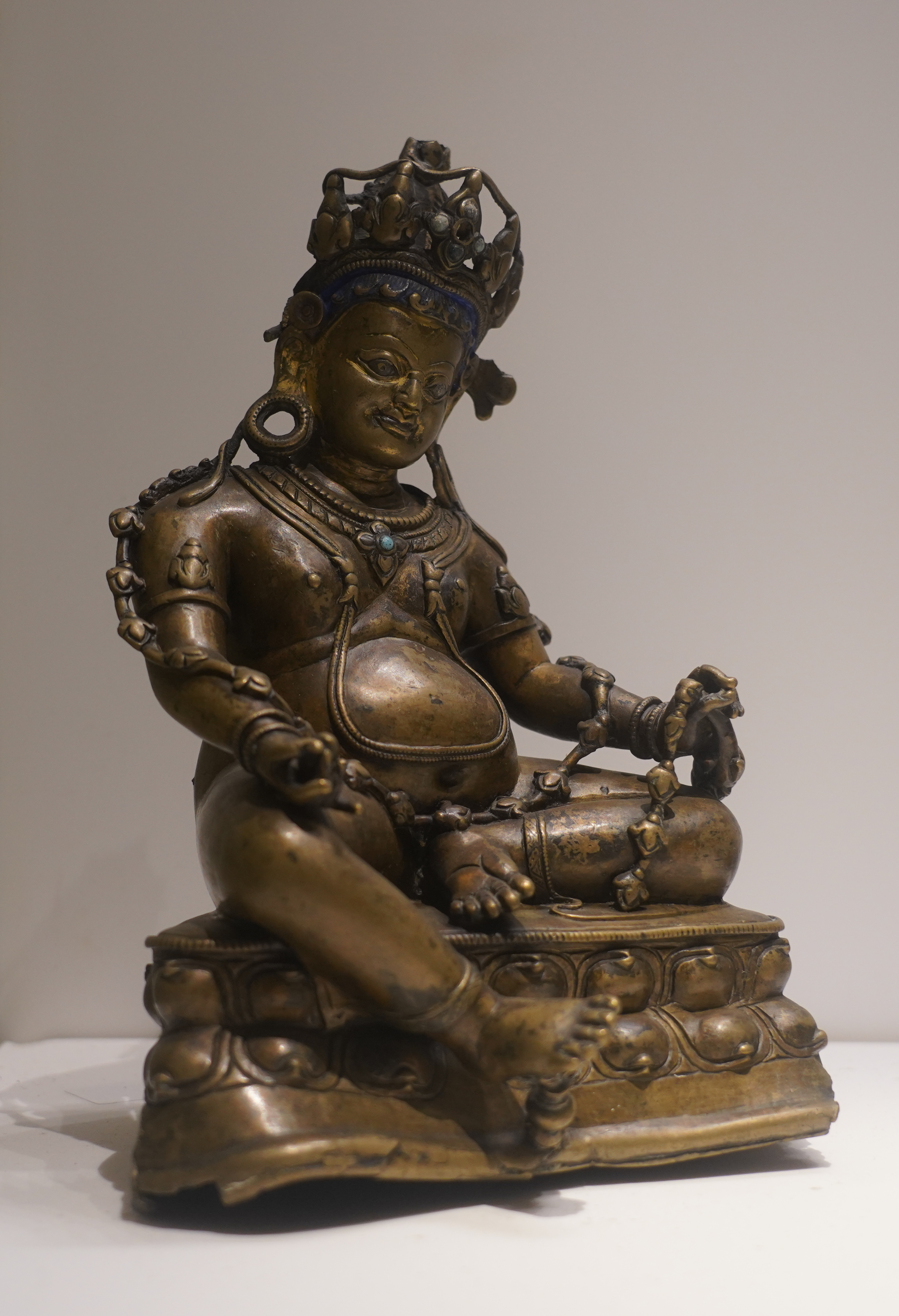
Bronze statue of Jambhala, 15th-16th century Tibet.

The five Jambhalas are the manifestations of the compassion of Buddhas and Bodhisattvas to guide sentient beings along the path to enlightenment. They have the essence of generosity and represent the activities of increasing benefit. Their aspirations are to help the poor and those suffering from ill-fortune.

=== Green Jambhala ===
Green Jambhala is the chief of the five Jambhalas and is the manifestation of Buddha Amoghasiddhi, depicted standing upon a corpse and holding a mongoose in his left hand and a Kapala in his right hand.

He is usually shown with his consort and carrying a jewel producing mongoose in his left hand. Green Jambhala has bluish green colored body. He sits in the vajra position with Dakini in front of him. His right leg is panhandle with right foot is above a snail and lotus flower, while his left leg is kinked. On his left hand is an animal called Nehulay (mongoose) which spue out jewels from its mouth, his right hand holding Norbu. The Dakini holding lotus flower in her hand. The Mantra of Green Jambhala is:

Om Karma Jambhala Ah Svaha

=== White Jambhala ===
White Jambhala (or Dzambhala Gapee in Tibetan) is the compassionate manifestation of the Bodhisattva Chenrezig (Guan Yin). He can remove the suffering of poverty and sickness, purify non-virtuous karma and karmic obstacles, avert disaster and sickness, and evolve bodhicitta mind.

The Tibetan legend said that a revered high lama, Atisha, was walking alone when he found a man starving and near death. After looking around and unable to find food for the old man, he cut flesh from his own body and offered it to the starving man. But the man refused to eat of his flesh. Being depressed and not knowing how else to help the man nearing death, Lama Atisha sat down next to him. At that point there was a blinding bright white light and before Atisha appeared Chenrezig of Compassion. He told Lama Atisha that he was going to manifest himself as the God of Wealth, Jambhala, and assure that those in poverty would suffer no longer.

As the manifestation of Avalokitesvara Bodhisattva, White Jambhala was born from his right eye. He sits on a snow lion, although some artists depict him sitting on a dragon, and a mongoose in his left hand spits out precious diamonds and ornaments. White Jambhala has white colored body. He also holding a Wealth Banner in his left arm and a gold sword in his right. The Mantra of White Jambhala is:

Om Padma Krodha Arya Jambhala Hridaya Hum Phat

When cultivating the "Dragon-riding White Jambhala Practice", the practitioners can also pray that he will lead them to hidden treasures. In the olden days, Tibetan Tantric masters placed their precious teachings in caves. These teachings were sealed in the four elements of "earth, water, fire and wind". One needs to employ very special methods to retrieve these Dharma treasures. One must also know the location of the caves where these ancestry masters had practiced in seclusion. The practitioners may pray to the "Dragon-riding White Jambhala" so that he will bring them to these caves where the treasures were hidden.

=== Yellow Jambhala ===
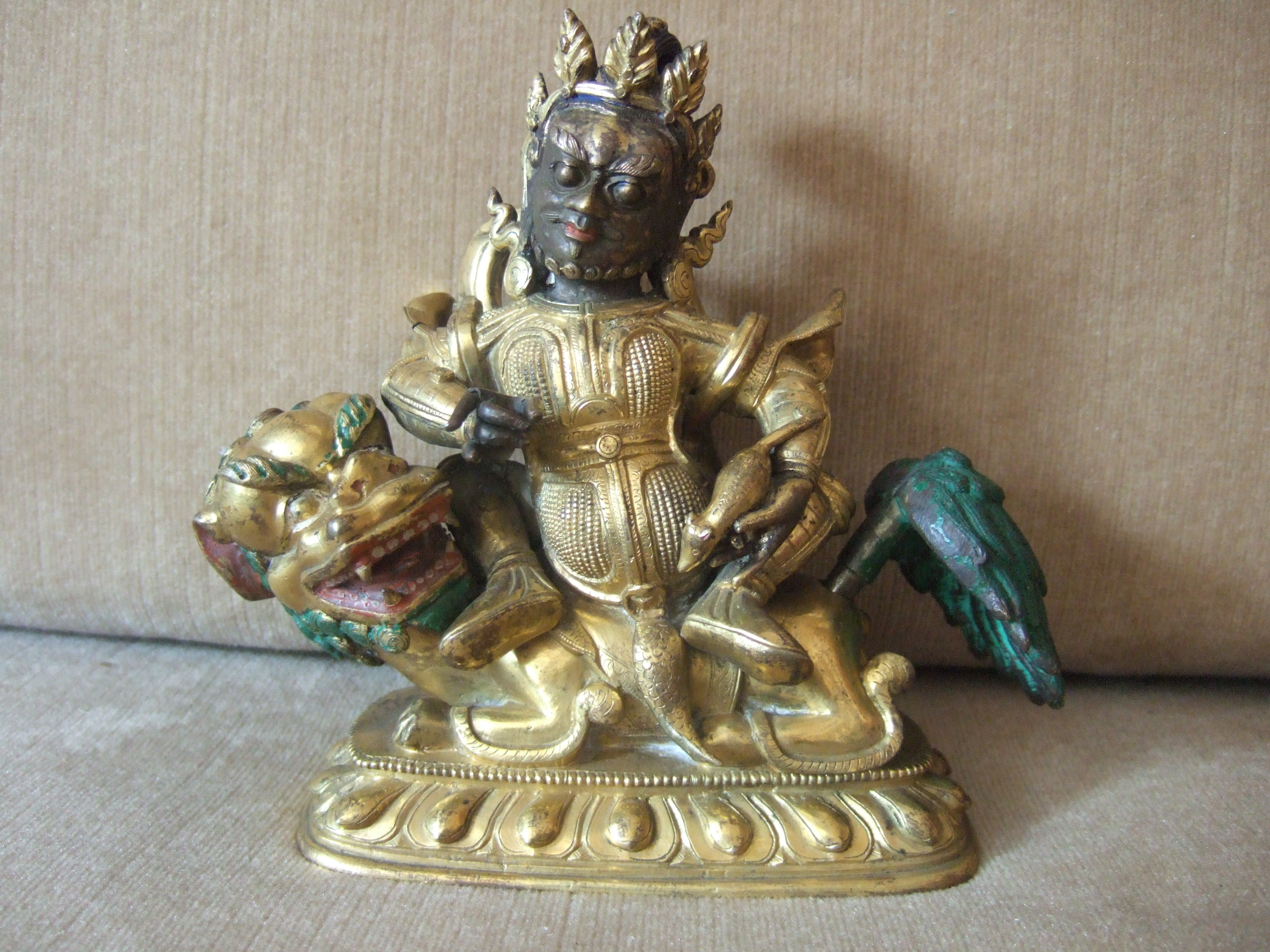
Partly gilded Tibetan bronze statue of Vaisravana Jambhala sitting on a snow lion and holding a mongoose in his left hand. 18th century

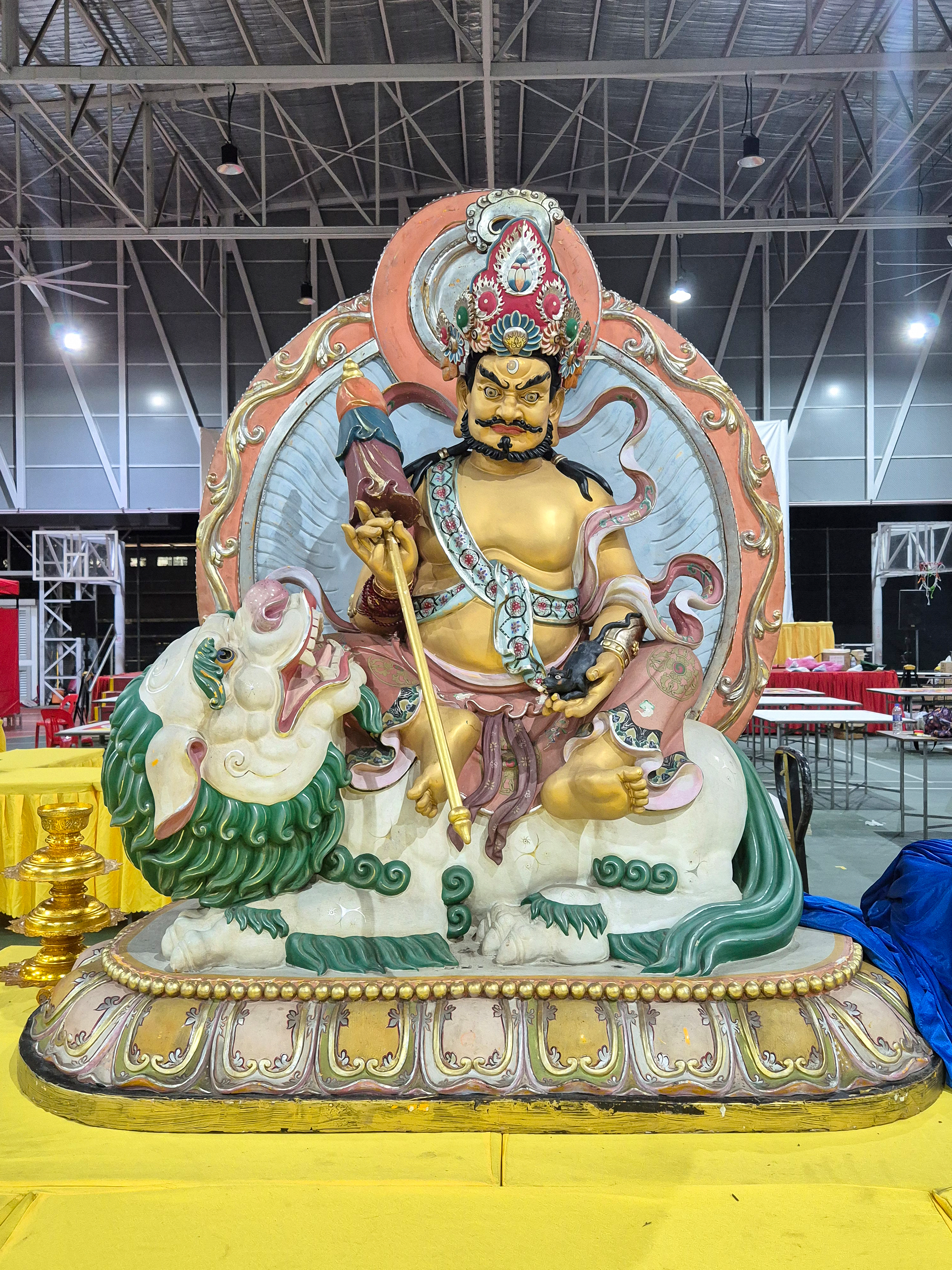
Yellow Jambhala at a prayer event in Singapore.

The Yellow Jambhala is considered the most popular and powerful of the Wealth Gods. He is the emanation of Buddha Ratnasambhava. He can remove poverty within the six realms, increasing virtues, life span and wisdom.

He is also said to be an emanation of Vaisravana, one of the "Four Great World-protecting Heavenly Kings". He is the guardian of light in Buddhism, a great charitable deity who grants fortune and protection. Lord Vaisravana lives in the northern region under the Four Heavens, at the northern crystal palace on the fourth level of Mount Sumeru. His servants are either yaksas or bhaisajya-yaksas. According to the commentary on Lotus Sutra, this heavenly king is extremely knowledgeable as his perpetual protection of the Buddhas has enabled him to receive many teachings.

Yellow Jambhala has yellow colored body, he sits in the vajra position with his right leg is panhandle, his right foot is above a snail and lotus flower, and his left leg is kinked. He has one face and two arms. His left hand holding a mongoose named Nehulay which spews forth precious jewels from its mouth, while his right hand holding gems shaped fruit and leaf of lotus. An ordinary image of Lord Vaisravana is one that holds a precious pagoda in the left, which pours out various treasures. In Tibetan Tantric images, the precious pagoda is replaced by the treasure-emitting mongoose. Yellow Jambhala sits on a lotus, sun disk and moon disk. His mantra is:

Om Jambhala Jalendraye Svaha

=== Red Jambhala ===
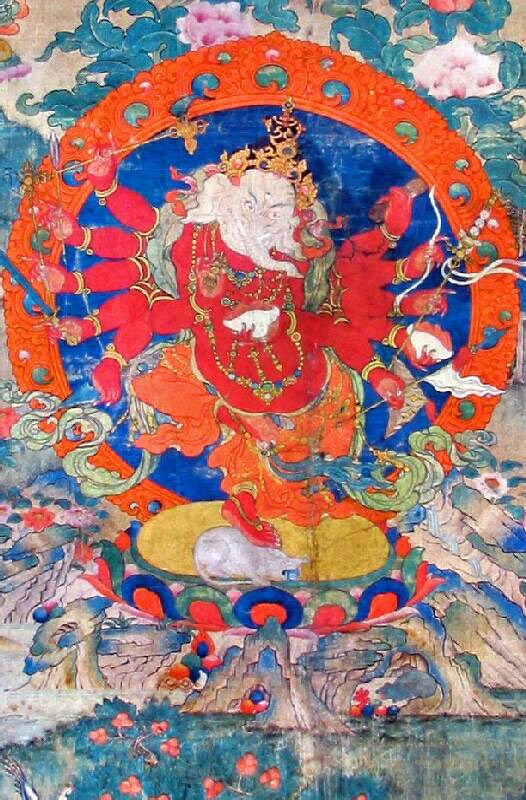
Ganapati, Maha Rakta

Red Jambhala is depicted practising together with his consort, the heavenly mother of wealth that is in charge of wealth in the human realm. In ancient times, this deity was practiced mainly by kings and royalty. His practice is most suitable to people in high power, or to pray for high power, for it can attract people, wealth and fame. One will enjoy wealth in abundance and shall be well respected and supported by people. There is also the Red Jambhala magnetizing method that can bless the practitioner with marital bliss and a harmonious family.

Red Jambhala is the manifisation of Vajrasattva. He has two faces and four arms and holds a treasury mongoose on his left hand. His Tibetan name is Dzambhala Mapo. Red Jambhala has a red colored body, sits in the vajra position with Dakini in front of him. His right leg is panhandle with right foot is above a snail and lotus flower, his left leg is bent. He is holding an animal known as Nehulay (mongoose) in his left hand, his right hand holding Khorlo (Cakra), the Dakini holding Kapala containing Nectar in her left hand and Norbu Mebar in her right hand. The Mantra of Red Jambhala is:

Om Jambhala Jalendraye Dhanam Medehi Hrih Dakini Jambhala Sambhara Svaha

Some people believe he is the Hindu God of Wealth Ganesha, the Red Ganapati, and has the head of an elephant. After the rise of Tantric Buddhism, Ganesha became a Tantric wealth deity and is known as the "Lord of Provisions in Tibetan Tantrism". According to legend, Red Jambhala was in charge of the heavenly treasury that belonged to Lord Mahesvara’s son. Due to his extreme compassion, Red Jambhala had unfailingly answered the prayers of many worshippers. Enraged by Red Jambhala’s indiscriminate charity to both the good and evil, Dharma guardian Mahakala decapitated him. It was only after the wealth deity repents that Mahakala plants an elephant’s head on his neck and receives him as a retainer.

=== Black Jambhala ===
The Black Jambhala is also known as the Hindu God of Wealth, Kubera. Originated in ancient India, he manifested from the waters of the river and gave the transmission of generating wealth to a king whose kingdom was undergoing extreme financial difficulties during that time. He also benefits the poor and those in solitary retreat that have a virtuous mind.

Popularized by Shakyasribhadra, holding a skullcup and mongoose, naked and wrathful in a standing posture. He is the God of Wealth in Tibetan Buddhism. With august guise he treads on the back of yellow rich man. Jambhala, Black (Tibetan: dzam bha la, nag po), a wealth deity popularized in Tibet by Bari Lotsawa (b.1040) and the Kashmiri teacher Shakyashri Bhadra.

... the Lord Jambhala, with a body black in colour, having the appearance of a dwarf, naked, sexually aroused, pot-bellied, with pierced ears, three bulging bloodshot eyes, brown hair flowing upwards and bared fangs, in a standing position, the right leg bent, and the left straight. He has one head and two arms. The right hand holds the top of a skull in front of his chest as a blood container, and the left hand holds a mongoose expelling wish fulfilling jewels. On his head is a crown of five skulls in the shape of the Five-Buddha crown; around his neck is a string of 50 prayer beads made of human skulls, with five-colored snakes as bracelets on hands, feet and neck. He shows anger on his face, standing with his right leg bent, his left leg extended, the right leg is extended pressing upon the head of the yellow Lord of Wealth, adorned with various gold ornaments, lying face down beneath Black Jambhala's feet.

— Ngorchen Konchog Lhundrup, 1497-1557)

He is the manifestation of Amoghasiddhi Buddha by the request of Buddha Shakyamuni to turn the Wheel of Dharma to benefit sentient beings who are suffering from poverty. He will enable all endeavors to be perfectly accomplished and purify all bad luck and obstacles, prevent theft, bad debts and loss of wealth. Jambhala has a black colored body. He is depicted in a standing position over a human body, symbolizes to subdue human’s ego and eliminate human’s greed. His right hand is holding a Gem Pot and his left hand is holding an animal named Nehulay (mongoose) that spews jewels from out of its mouth. Black Jambhala also wears a snake necklace on his body. The Mantra of Black Jambhala is:

Om Jambhala Jalendraye Bashu Dharini Svaha

== The practice ==
In Tantrism, Jambhala practice is an expedient and worldly cultivation-method. Tantric cultivation is divided into “Generation Stage” and “Completion Stage”; Generation Stage is the foundation while Completion Stage consists of practices pertaining to the holy truth and the transcendental methods. Jambhala practice is a fundamental cultivation-method.

The basis of five Jambhalas practices is Bodhicitta. Practitioners should generate the altruistic intention of compassion (Bodhicitta), and practice generosity. The practice can remove poverty within the six realms and increase one's merits, wisdom and lifespan. All their material and spiritual needs will be met.

The puja of five Jambhalas summons immense positive wealth energies upon the participants. The Buddhists believe that wealth results from one's past actions, but this puja itself also plays a significant role in changing the course of one's financial situation. Gaden Shartse said:

With a sincere motivation to accumulate merit, purify our negative karma, as well as make prayers for all sentient beings to be freed from all poverty and all sufferings, without doubt - one will certainly receive the vast blessings and protection of the wealth deities.

Some people claim that cultivating the Jambhala practice will increase one's greed. Although the spiritual practitioner has the desire to gain great fortune, his body, mind and speech are nonetheless gradually purified in the process of practicing the Tantric method.

=== Reciting mantras ===
Chanting the mantra of every Jambhala is believed to be more beneficial if the chanter has received oral transmissions from a teacher who holds the teaching Lineage.

=== Pouring water over statues ===
The legend said that while Gautama Buddha was teaching the Maha Prajna-Paramita Sutra, the jealous Devadatta threw rocks at the Buddha. But instead, the rocks hit White and Yellow Jambhalas on their heads and hit Black Jambhala on the stomach. Buddha then came over to Jambhala and blessed him; from his hand came a white, nectar-like substance of wisdom and compassion and love, and touched Jambhala's head. Jambhala felt very blissful, happy, calm, and cleaned his impurities and obstructions, and his wounds. Jambhala immediately bowed down to Buddha and thanked him.

Sakyamuni Buddha said to him, “As I have healed you and I poured this holy nectar onto you, in the future any one of my students or student’s students who invokes your power and pours water onto your head - bestow on them wealth, give them the two types of wealth, material wealth and spiritual wealth, more importantly spiritual wealth.” After that, Jambhala folded his hands and said, “I will do as you have said and I promise that I will do that.”

That story has become the basis for the practitioners of Jambhala Puja to pour water over their statues or to place their statues under the falling water of six-step waterfalls.

== See also ==
- Cai Shen
- Ganesha
- Kubera
- Vaiśravaṇa
