= Tsering Wangmo Dhompa =

American poet

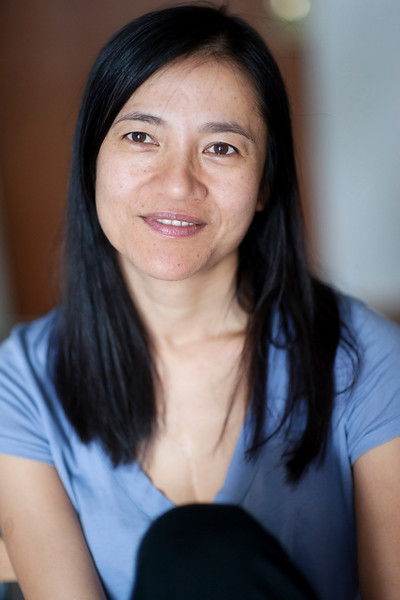
- Born: Tsering Wangmo Dhompa; 1969 (age 56–57); Chennai, Tamil Nadu, India
- Writing career
- Genres: Poetry, non-fiction
- Notable work: Rules of the House

Tsering Wangmo Dhompa (born 1969) is the first Tibetan female poet to be published in English.

== Early life ==
She was raised in India and Nepal. Tsering received her BA from Lady Shri Ram College, University of Delhi. She pursued her MA from University of Massachusetts and her MFA in creative writing from San Francisco State University. She has a Ph.D. in literature from the University of California, Santa Cruz and is currently an associate professor in the English Department at Villanova University.

== Literary career ==
Her first book of poems, Rules of the House, published by Apogee Press in 2002, was a finalist for the Asian American Literary Awards in 2003. Other publications include, a chapbook Revolute (Albion Books, 2021), My Rice Tastes Like the Lake (Apogee Press 2011), In the Absent Everyday (also from Apogee Press), and two other chapbooks: In Writing the Names (A.bacus, Poets & Poets Press) and Recurring Gestures (Tangram Press).

In Letter For Love she delivered her first short story. In 2013, Penguin India published Tsering's first full-length book, A Home in Tibet, in which she chronicles her successive journeys to Tibet and provides ethnographic details of ordinary Tibetans inside Tibet.

== Bibliography ==
=== Books ===
- The Politics of Sorrow: Unity and Allegiance Across Tibetan Exile, Columbia University Press 2025
- Revolute, Albion Books, VA 2021
- Coming Home to Tibet, Shambhala Publications, Boulder 2016
- A Home in Tibet, Penguin India, Delhi 2013
- My Rice Tastes Like the Lake, Apogee Press, Berkeley 2011
- In the Absent Everyday, Apogee Press, Berkeley 2005
- Rules of the House, Apogee Press, Berkeley 2002
- Recurring Gestures, Tangram Press,
- In Writing the Names, Abacus, 2000

=== Anthologies ===
- Old Demons, New Deities: Twenty-One Short Stories from Tibet, edited by Tenzin Dickie. OR Books, 2021.
- Contemporary Voices of the Eastern World: An Anthology of Poems, edited by Tina Chang, Nathalie Handal, and Ravi Shankar. W.W. Norton and Co. 2007
- The Wisdom Anthology of North American Buddhist Poetry Ed. Andrew Schelling, Wisdom Publications 2005 Page 41-51
- Muses in Exile: An Anthology of Tibetan Poetry Ed. Bhuchung D. Sonam Paljor Publications Pvt. Ltd. India 2005.
- An Other Voice: English Literature from Nepal, edited by Deepak Thapa and Kesang Tseten, Martin Chautari 2002 Nepal

=== Articles ===
- "This Wor(l)d as an Illusion", Evening will Come, March 2011
- Letter For Love, Caravan Magazine, Vol. 2, Issue 08 (August 2010)
- "After the Earthquake", Phayul April 29, 2010
- Nostalgia in Contemporary Tibetan Writing

== See also ==
- List of Tibetan writers
