= Liu Manqing =

Chinese diplomat

- 劉曼卿
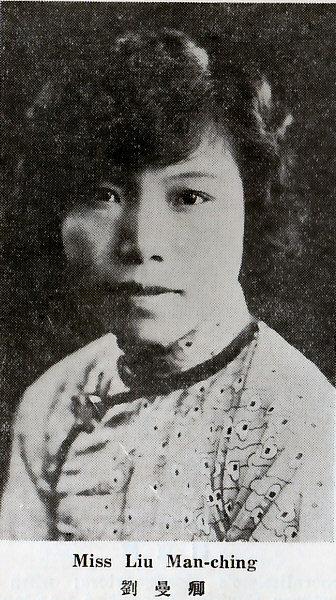
- Liu Manqing, from a 1936 biographical directory
- Born: 1906; Lhasa, Qing China
- Died: 1941 (aged 34–35); Chongqing, China
- Other names: Liu Man-ching, Yudhona, Yongjin, De Meixi
- Occupations: Diplomat, translator, writer

Liu Manqing (Chinese: 劉曼卿; 1906–1941) was a Tibetan and Chinese writer, diplomat, messenger, and interpreter, born in Tibet.

== Early life ==
Liu (or Yudhona) was born in Lhasa, Tibet, the daughter of a Tibetan or Chinese father, Liu Rongguang, and a Tibetan mother. She spoke Tibetan as her first language, and her family was Muslim. She lived in Darjeeling for a time in childhood, when her parents were expelled from Tibet. She was later educated in Beijing, where she learned Mandarin, and may have trained as a nurse at a missionary hospital.

== Career ==
Liu returned to Tibet as a young woman, despite the travel difficulties of reaching Lhasa. She proceeded by water, on horseback, and on foot over rugged land, "successfully paving the way for a reconciliation between China and the Tibetan Government", predicted a 1930 news report. She conducted negotiations during visits with the 13th Dalai Lama, held a civil service appointment in China under Chiang Kai-shek, and was an envoy, interpreter and messenger between Chinese and Tibetan leaders in the 1920s and 1930s. She wrote three books, two about Tibet and one about education. In 1938, she reported to the Kuomintang in Chongqing about conditions in Xikang province.

In 1931, Liu was a founding member of the Association of the Border Areas of China, or Frontier Club. She spoke about her experiences to the Frontier Club at the University of Shanghai in 1932.

Liu used several names. She was also known as Yongjin and De Meixi.

== Selected publications ==
- Expedition in a Carriage to Xikang and Tibet (1933)
- Tibet (1934)
- Education in the Chinese Border Areas (1937)

== Personal life ==
Liu was married and soon divorced as a young woman in Beijing. She died in 1941, aged 35 years, in Chongqing. She is "remembered as a heroine by the Tibetan people", among whom the story of her arduous journeys to Lhasa is well known.
