= Yuthok Nyingthig =

Yuthok Nyingthig (Wylie transliteration: g.yu thog snying thig) is a tantric cycle composed (or re-discovered) by Yuthok Yontan Gonpo the Younger. It is a system of Buddhist practice which combines Traditional Tibetan medicine and Vajrayāna practices. These are the primary Vajrayāna practices of Tibetan medicine practitioners.

The Yuthok Nyingthig cycle of texts contains practices such as Yuthok Nyingthig Guru Accomplishment: Compassionate Sunlight for Dispersing Suffering's Darkness (Yuthok Nyingthig Ladrub Dugngel Munpa Selwey Nyimey Oser; g.yu thog snying thig bla sgrub sdug bsngal mun pa sel ba'i nyi ma'i 'od zer).

== Description of the text and practices ==
The practices are a part of a ngakpa (sngags pa) family lineage, and were handed down through the Yuthok family until they were taught to Sumtön Yeshe Zung (sum ston ye shes gzungs), the heart disciple of Yuthok Yontan Gonpo the Younger. More recent lineage holders include the late Khenpo Truro Tsenam, the late Khenpo Tsultrim Gyaltsen, and Micho Khedrub Gyatso Rinpoche. Dr. Nida Chenagstang (lce nag tshang nyi zla he ru ka), Micho Khedrub Gyatso Rinpoche, and Gyetrul Jigme Rinpoche have taught or are continuing to teach this lineage as well.

The Yuthok Nyingthig is a complete Vajrayāna cycle, including ngöndro, generation stage (bskyed rim) practices including four forms of Yuthok guru yoga and practices of Deva (i.e., yi dam) and Ḍākinī (mkha' 'gro ma), and completion stage (rdzogs rim) practices including the Six Yogas and Dzogchen.

The cycle includes additional practices such as mendrub (sman sgrub) or rituals for empowering and blessing medicine, healing and protection mantras, several pūjās, long-life practices, Medical Protectors including Shanglön (zhang blon), and instructions on a form of pulse diagnosis. Lastly, there are fifteen topics addressing diagnosis and treatment within Traditional Tibetan Medicine.

These practices have been of interest to academics studying the evolution of Tibetan medicine and mindfulness-based practices. A translation project by the National University of Natural Medicine and the Sorig Institute seeks to translate the work from Tibetan into English.
