= Dhondup Gyal =

Tibetan poet (1953–1985)

- Born: 1953
- Died: 1985 (aged 32)

Dhondup Gyal (1953–1985) is considered the first modern Tibetan poet breaking through traditional Tibetan formalist elements. He is widely regarded in Tibet as the founder of Modern Tibetan Poetry. An accomplished scholar, writer, poet and patriot, he committed suicide in 1985 when he was only 32.

Besides poetry he wrote many short stories. One short story "Trulku" was criticized for its portrayal of a charlatan lama who goes on to have relationships with two women, which caused a furor in the conservative Tibetan community in Tibet. A compilation of his short stories and poetry was published as Amnye Machen. His works are also available in translated form.

Dhondup Gyal, is the first Tibetan poet to have written his poems in free verse in Waterfall of Youth (Lang tsho'i rbab chu), influencing a generation in Tibet, including Namlo Yak.
