= Yuthog Yontan Gonpo =

Tibetan lama

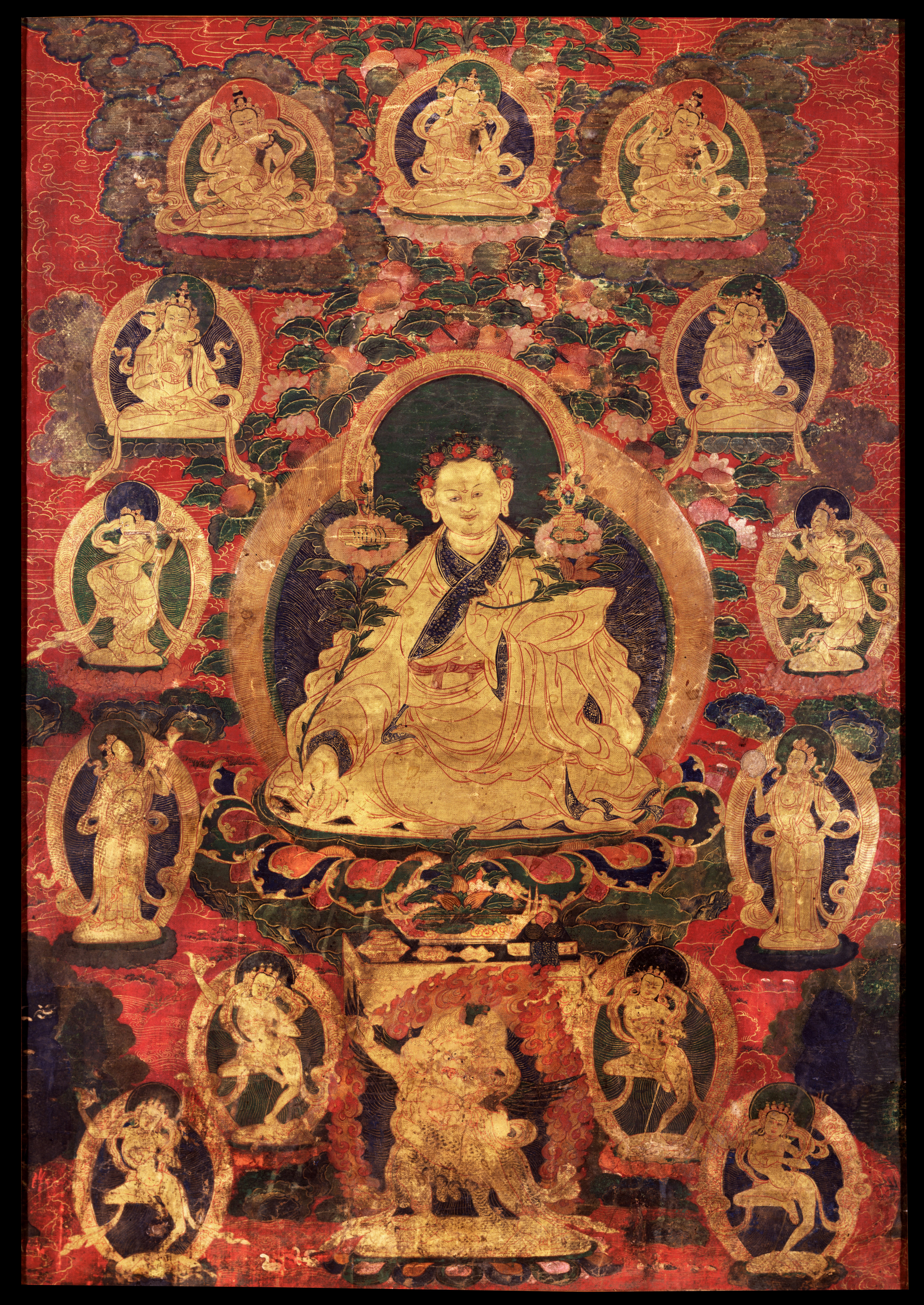
Portrait of Yuthog Yönten Gönpo

Yutog Yontan Gonpo (Tibetan: གཡུ་ཐོག་ཡོན་ཏན་མགོན་པོ), also known as Yuthog Yontan Gonpo the Elder (Tibetan: གཡུ་ཐོག་རྙིང་མ་ཡོན་ཏན་མགོན་པོ), is widely accepted to be a legend invented by the descendants of Yuthok Yontan Gonpo the Younger as a mythical 8th-century high lama and a physician of Tibet. Hagiographies claim he lived 125 years.
