= Tenzin Choedrak =

Dr. Tenzin Choedrak (April 15, 1922 – April 6, 2001) was the Senior Personal Physician to the Dalai Lama (Tenzin Gyatso, 14th Dalai Lama), and was recognized as an esteemed master in the Tibetan medical tradition. He was imprisoned by the Chinese without any formal charge and subject to torture for 17 years. His total imprisonment lasted almost 22 years from 1959-1980.

In April 1995 he testified before the United States House International Relations Committee, Subcommittee on International Operations and Human Rights where he related some of his experiences.

== Books ==
- The Rainbow Palace was published in 2000 by Bantam in the UK. - ISBN 0-553-81303-X, 978-0-553-81303-6

== See also ==
- Political prisoners
