= New Kadampa =

The term New Kadampa (Tibetan: བཀའ་གདམས་གསར་པ, Wylie: bka' gdams gsar pa) is a synonym for the 14th century Gelug school of Tibetan Buddhism, as founded by Je Tsongkhapa (Wylie: rje tsong kha pa). Being a great admirer of Kadam teachings, Je Tsongkhapa was an enthusiastic promoter of the 11th century Kadampa school's emphasis on the graded path to enlightenment and Mahayana principles of universal compassion as its fundamental spiritual orientation. Though the synonym is less well known in English-speaking countries, in Tibet the Gelugpa was well known as the "New Kadampa," while the earlier school was referred to as the "Ancient Kadampa" (Tibetan: བཀའ་གདམས་རྙིང་མ, Wylie: bka' gdams rnying ma) or "Original Kadampa" (Tibetan: བཀའ་གདམས་གོང་མ, Wylie: bka' gdams gong ma). Je Tsongkhapa considered the New Kadampa tradition he founded to be the successor to Atiśa's Old Kadampa tradition. Geoffrey Samuels remarks that Tsongkhapa "was following in the footsteps of Atisha, and indeed the Gelugpa are sometimes known as the 'New Kadampa' and regarded themselves as above all a continuation of Atisha's work."

In the 1990s Geshe Kelsang Gyatso founded the "controversial" New Kadampa Tradition (NKT), which was officially rebuked by the Dalai Lama. Its name derives from, but should not be confused with this synonym of the Gelug.
