= Yuthok Yontan Gonpo the Younger =

Tibetan doctor and ngakpa (1126–1202)

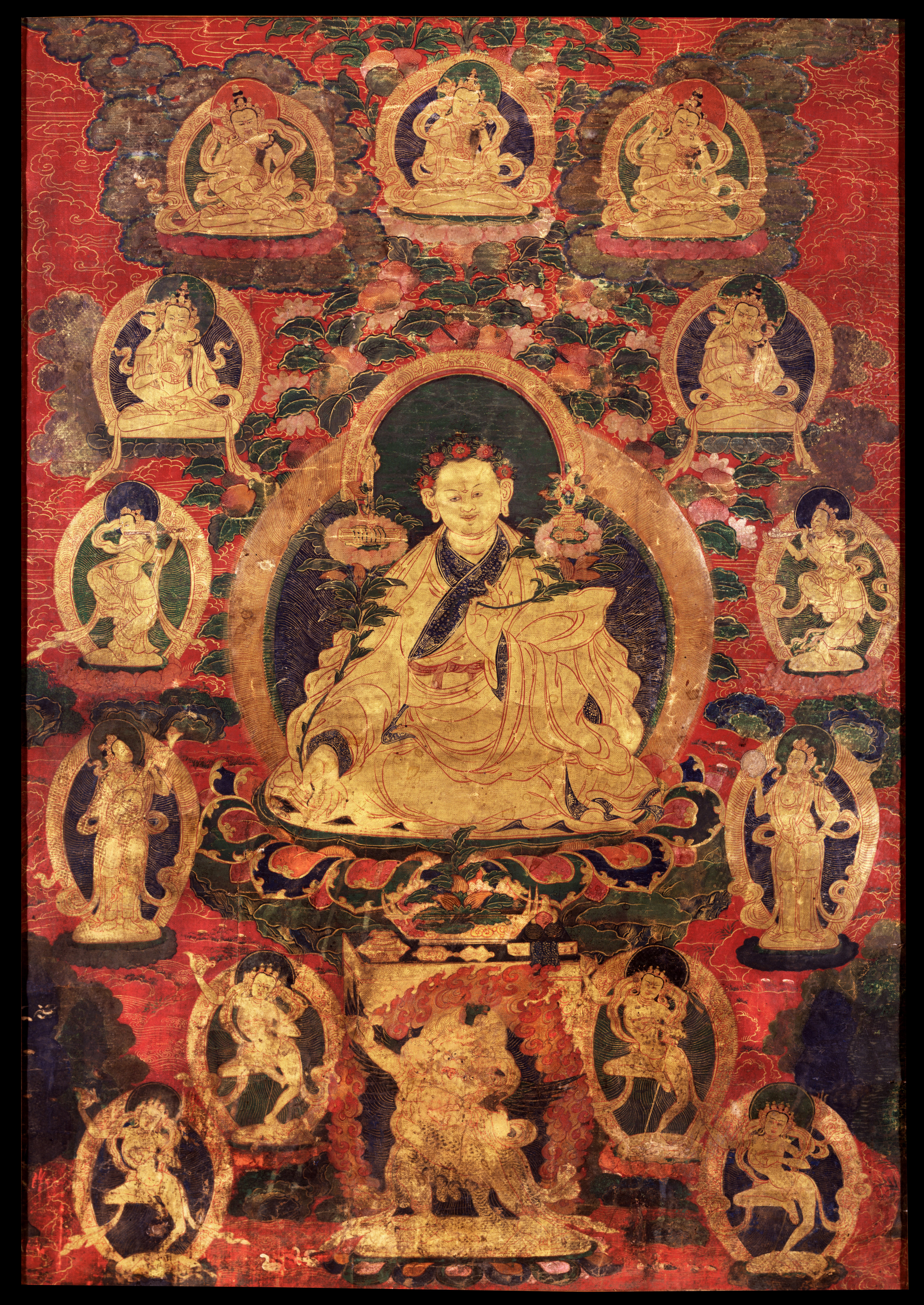
The Physician Yuthog Yontan Gonpo

Yuthok Yonten Gonpo the Younger (Tibetan: གཡུ་ཐོག་གསར་མ་ཡོན་ཏན་མགོན་པོ, Wylie: g.yu thog gsar ma yon tan mgon po) (1126–1202) was a Tibetan doctor and ngakpa (lay, non-monastic tantric practitioner), credited with composing the Four Medical Tantras (rgyud bzhi), a four-book treatise on Traditional Tibetan Medicine which forms the main course of study in the Tibetan medical tradition. He is widely regarded as the main founder of Tibetan medicine, mostly based on his composition of the Four Medical Tantras. His other important contribution to Tibetan culture was the Yuthok Nyingthik, whose full name is the Yuthok Nyingthik Guru Sādhanā, ‘Compassionate Sunlight for Dispersing Suffering’s Darkness’ (g.yu thog snying thig bla sgrub sdug bsngal mun sel nyi ma’i ’od zer), which is the main Tantric Buddhist practice-cycle associated with Tibetan medicine. It is traditionally considered to be an important spiritual component of healing in Tibetan medical culture, and moreover is regarded in all Tibetan Buddhist traditions as a very special method for attaining awakening and realization quickly.

== Biography ==
Born in the village of Goshi Rethang in Western Tibet, his father was Yuthok Khyungpo Dorje and his mother Pema Odenma. Yuthok was from a family lineage of royal court Traditional Tibetan Medicine doctors who trace their origin to the time of King Lha Thothori (441–561). At age eight, he began to study—with his father and other teachers, including Manjusri—a wide range of topics from medicine, Buddhism, and the arts and languages. At age fourteen, he began traveling through Central Tibet, where he met a Geshe called Roton Konchok Kyap who transmitted the Four Tantras: the Essence of Ambrosia Secret Instruction to Yuthok. At age eighteen, he traveled to India for the first time, where he studied the Eight Branches of Healing, Somaradza, and other treatises on medicine with Paldan Phreng-ba. When he was twenty-one, Yuthok returned to Tibet, where he set up a clinic and began teaching medicine to his students. At thirty-one, he returned to India, where he received a teaching which later became known as the Yuthok Nyingthig, The Innermost Essence of Yuthok. It is said that he traveled to India six times. His heart-disciple was Sumton Yeshe Sung, who received the Four Tantras and the Yuthok Nyingthig. It is said that at age seventy-six, Yuthok gathered his students for a final teaching before attaining the Rainbow Body and departing to Tunadug, the pure land of the Medicine Buddha.

== Works ==
The Secret Quintessential Instructions on the Eight Branches of the Ambrosia Essence Tantra or The Four Tantras This is a collection of four tantras which comprise the basis of Traditional Tibetan Medicine. It is divided into the Root Tantra (rtsa rgyud), The Explanatory Tantra (bshe rgyud), The Oral-instruction Tantra (man ngag rgyud), and The Subsequent Tantra (phyi ma rgyud). The Root Tantra has six chapters and gives (1) an introduction, (2) general outline of topics, (3) the basis of disease, (4) diagnosis, (5) methods of treatment, and (6) an enumeration of the metaphors used in Traditional Tibetan Medicine. The Explanatory Tantra is divided into eleven divisions and thirty-one chapters, and covers (1) a summary of fundamentals, (2) the life cycle, (3) fundamentals of pathology, (4) behavior and lifestyle, (5) diet, (6) pharmacology, (7) tools of the physician, (8) health and prevention, (9) diagnosis, (10) method of treatment, and (11) ethics of a physician. The Oral-instruction Tantra has fifteen divisions that are explained in ninety-two chapters; the divisions include (1) pathology of the three humors, (2) internal disorders, (3) fever, (4)pathology of the upper parts of the body, (5) pathology of the solid and hollow organs, (6) genital disorders, (7) common diseases, (8) dermatology, (9) pediatrics, (10) gynecological disorders, (11) disorders caused by spirit provocation, (12) injury, (13) toxicology, (14) longevity, and (15) aphrodisiacs. The Subsequent Tantra has four topics in twenty-five chapters, including (1) diagnosis, (2) pharmacological formulae, (3) purifying therapies, and (4) external therapies.

Yuthok Nyingthik (g.yu thog snying thig) is a practice of tantra featuring Buddhist practices which combine Traditional Tibetan Medicine and Vajrayana.

These practices are part of a family lineage held by ngakpas that were handed down through the Yuthok family until they were taught to Sumton Yeshe Zung, the heart-disciple of Yuthok Yonten Gonpo the Younger. Recent lineage holders include the late Khenpo Truro Tsenam, the late Khenpo Tsultrim Gyaltsen, and Micho Khedrub Gyatso Rinpoche. Currently, Dr. Nida Chenagtsang is teaching this lineage as well.

The Yuthok Nyingthik is a complete Vajrayana cycle, including Ngöndro, Generation stage (bskyed rim) practices including four forms of Yuthok Guru Yoga and practices of Deva (Yidam) and Dakini, Completion stage (rdzogs rim) practices, including the Six Yogas, and Dzogchen. The cycle includes additional practices: mendrub (sman sgrub) or rituals for empowering and blessing medicine, healing and protection mantras, several offering rituals, longevity practices, Medical Protectors, and instructions on a form of pulse diagnosis. Lastly, there are fifteen topics addressing diagnosis and treatment within Traditional Tibetan Medicine.

== See also ==
- Traditional Tibetan Medicine
- Yuthog Yontan Gonpo
- Yuthok Nyingthig
- Desi Sangye Gyatso
- Ayurveda
- Tibetan People
