= Tashi Tsering (Australian Geshe) =

Khensur Rinpoche, Geshe Tashi Tsering OAM (Tibetan: བཀྲ་ཤིས་ཚེ་རིང་, Wylie: Bkra-shis Tse-ring) (born 1937) is a Tibetan teacher in the Gelug tradition. He lived and taught in the West for many years in Australia, New Zealand, India and Tibet.

== Early life ==
Born in eastern Tibet, Tsering became a monk at age seven and at seventeen went to study at Sera Monastery in Lhasa. After fleeing the 1959 communist takeover of Tibet, he continued his monastic education in exile in India, becoming a Lharampa Geshe in 1984.

== Career ==
He was the resident teacher at Chenrezig Institute in Queensland for 18 years. From April 2009 until October 2014, he was first the Vajra Master and then the Abbot of Gyü-me Tantric College in southern India.

He subsequently returned to Australia and teaches in Brisbane at the Tashi Khangmar Sambrub Ling, a school of Buddhist Science, which he founded in 2008. He and his students founded the Good Fortune Trust to support monastics in Asia, and has developed an extensive programme of Buddhist teachings, and established an advanced course, the Buddhist Studies Programme.

== Bibliography ==
- Geshe Tashi Tsering, The Buddha's Medicine for the Mind, Lothian Books, ISBN 0-7344-0565-0
