= The White Bird and His Wife =

East Asian folktale

The White Bird and His Wife is an East Asian folktale published as part of the compilation of The Bewitched Corpse, a written collection of folktales from Asia. Scholars related it to the cycle of the animal bridegroom: a human woman who marries a supernatural husband in animal form and, after losing him, has to seek him out.

== Origin ==
The Tales of the Bewitched Corpse is a compilation of Indo-Tibetan stories that was later brought to Mongolia and translated to Mongolic languages. The collection is known in India as Vetala Pañcaviṃśati, in Tibet as Ro-sgrung, in Mongolia as Siditü kegür, and in Oirat as Siddhi kǖr.

In this regard, Mongolian linguist Tsendiin Damdinsüren noted the existence of two Tibetan compilations of Vetala tales, one with 13 chapters and the other with 21. Also, both versions were mentioned in the work The Book of the Son, written in 11th century. Lastly, the divergence in contents between the Indian Vetala and the Tibetan versions, according to Damdinsuren, may indicate the latter were original works, instead of an adaptation or translation. In the same vein, according to Tibetologist Françoise Robin, there are more than 20 versions of the compilation in the Tibetan-speaking zone alone, and their common versions contain between thirteen and twenty-five stories, with some even reaching up to 75 tales.

== Summary ==
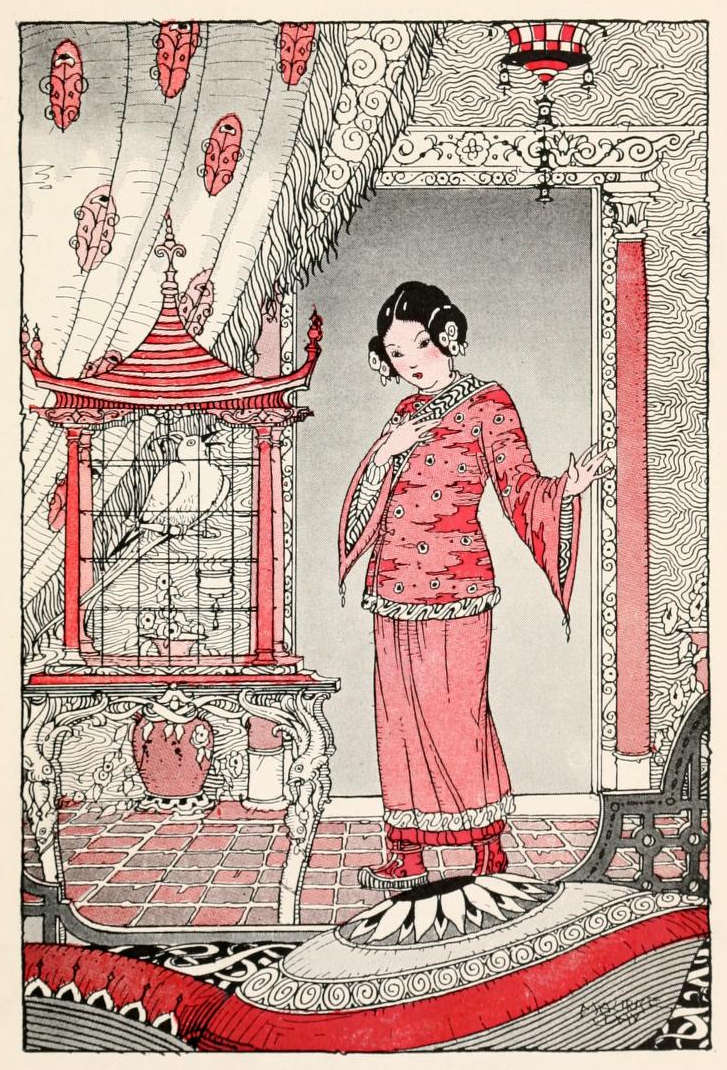
The girl finds the cage with her husband's bird-soul locked inside. Illustration by Maurice Day for Wonder Tales from Tibet (1922).

The following summary is based on Rachel Harriette Busk's, Frederick Herman Martens's and Bernhard Jülg's translations of the story.

In a distant kingdom called Fair-flower-garden, a man lives with his three daughters grazing their goat herds. One day, the goats vanish, and the elder daughter goes to look for them. She finds a large red door and goes through, then a gate of mother-of-pearl and another of emerald. A white bird (Note: In an early 19th century publication by German priest Benjamin Fürchtegott von Bergmann, he claimed that the original language word was Zagaom Schabucha, referring to a species of great owl.) appears to her and tells her that he can show where her herds are, as long as she consents to marry him. The elder daughter refuses.

The next day, the middle daughter goes to look for the goats, and the same bird appears with the same proposal. She also refuses. The following day, the youngest daughter goes to look for her goats, and a bird appears to her. The youngest believes its words and agrees to marry him.

Sometime after, a large gathering is happening near a local temple, and will last 13 days. The white bird's wife joins the people as the loveliest woman in the gathering. A mysterious rider on a dappled gray horse also joins the people. The white bird's wife goes back to the bird's palace and tells her husband about the rider at the gathering.

This goes on for the next days. On the 12th day of the gathering, the white bird's wife pours out her heart to an old woman about the mysterious rider. The old woman advises the girl to pretend to go to the gathering, wait for her husband to take off the birdskin, assume human form and ride to the festival on his dappled gray horse.

On the 13th day, the girl waits until her husband becomes human and leaves on his horse, then burns the perch, the birdcage and the featherskin. Later, after her husband returns, the girl tells him that she burned his featherskin and the cage, to keep him in human form permanently. Her husband despairs at her action, because his soul was inside the cage, and now "gods and dæmons" will come for him. The only solution is for her to stand the gate of mother-of-pearl and hew a stick for seven days and seven nights, without interruption.

The White Bird, in human form, rests by a pond, carrying a bundle of worn out boots on his back. Illustration by George W. Hood for Fairy Tales from the Orient (1923).

The girl gets some motes of feather-grass to apply to her eyelids. She resists for seven days, but, on the seventh night, the motes of grass come off her eyes and she fails the task, thus allowing her husband to be taken. She then goes looking for him anywhere between the heavens and the earth.

One day, she hears his voice coming from up in the mountains. She follows it until she reaches a stream, where she finds her husband, carrying pairs of boots on his back. He explains that the gods and demons made him their water-carrier, and the worn-out boots indicate that he has been like this for some time. The girl asks what she can do to rescue him, and her husband tells her to build a new birdcage and to woo his soul back into it.

== Variants ==
In the translated version by Charles John Tibbitts with the title The Bird-Man, a father lives with his three daughters, who herds their calves; the sisters pass through a golden door, a silver door and a brazen door and find the bird; the youngest sister marries the bird. During the 13 days' feast around the large pagoda in the neighbourhood, the bird, in human form, rides a white horse, and his wife burns his birdhouse, which was the husband's soul. When the wife finally finds him again after he disappears, he explains that he is forced to draw water for the Tschadkurrs and the Tângâri. The wife saves him by building a new birdhouse.

=== Mongolia ===
Hungarian orientalist László L. Lőrincz established the classification of the Mongolian tale corpus, published as Mongolische Märchentypus ("MMT"). In his system, he indexed a tale type he termed 163, Der Eulen-Gatte ("The Owl Husband"): three sisters lose their cattle and go after it; an owl offers their cattle back in exchange for marrying him; only the youngest sister agrees and marries the owl; later, she attends a town festival and sees a handsome stranger (who is her husband in human form); she discovers the stranger is her husband and burns the birdskin, causing the demons to kidnap him; she makes a new birdskin to rescue him from the demons.

According to László L. Lőrincz, all Mongolian versions of The Bewitched Corpse contain 13 tales. The seventh tale of the compilation is titled Sibaɣun ger-tü ("The Man in the Form of a Bird"). In a 1959 publication of Mongolian fairy tales, a variant was published as its eighth tale, whose translated title is Histoire de la femme dont le mari était un coq ("The story of the girl whose husband is a rooster").

Russian Mongolist Boris Ya. Vladimirtsov translated and published in 1958 a Mongol-Oirat version of The Bewitched Corpse, whose seventh tale is titled "Имеющий птичью оболочку" ("Having a Bird Skin"): the man and his three daughters live in a place called Jirgalangiin-ӧy. Later in the tale, the youngest daughter marries the bird and burns his birdskin to keep him human forever, but he explains to her that his life was in the birdskin.

=== Kalmyk people ===
Baira Goryaeva, expert on Kalmyk folklore, grouped tales about lost spouses (husbands and wives) under the same type of the Kalmyk tale corpus: type 400/1, "Муж ищет исчезнувшую или похищенную жену (жена ищет мужа)" ("Man searching for lost wife/Wife searching for lost husband"). She noted that the Mongol-Oirat tale "Имеющий птичью оболочку" fit the tale type she abstracted.

Charles Fillingham Coxwell translated a Kalmyk variant with the title The Story of the Bird-Cage Husband: an old man lives with his three daughters in the "Land of the Lustrous Flower Gardens", and they spend their days grazing their buffalo. One day, their animal disappears. The elder sisters goes looking for it and reaches a large red portal that leads to a court. She passes by the red portal, then by a gate of mother-of-pearl and finally by a gate of emerald, and finds herself in a grand palace with a little bird sitting on a table. The little bird tells her it can reveal the fate of the buffalo, in exchange for her marrying him. She refuses. The middle sister passes by the same three portals and declines the same offer. The youngest sister agrees to become the bird's wife, and it returns the buffalo to her family. Some time later, an assembly of people gathers as part of a 13 days' visit to a divine image in a monastery. The girl goes to the assembly and sees a fine youth on a blue-gray horse. The girl returns home and tells her little bird husband about the youth. This goes on for 11 days. On the 12th day of the assembly, an old woman tells the girl the youth on the horse is her husband, and that she should toss her husband's bird-cage into the fire. The girl follows the old woman's instructions. Later that night, the husband returns and she tells him about the bird-cage. The husband despairs at the fact and gives his wife a stick, for her to beat herself with it near the gate of mother-of-pearl for seven days and nights until his battle with the demons ceases. The girl obeys and resists for 6 days and nights, until, on the 7th day, she tires and her husband is taken by the demons. The girl searches for her husband, until she hears his voice in a mountain and in the depths of a river. Finding her husband near a pile of stones, he tells her he has become a water-carrier for "gods and demons" and that she can save him by building another bird-cage, then vanishes. Heeding his words, the girl returns to their home, fashions a new bird-cage and "invites her husband's soul" to enter it.

Austrian journalist Adolf Gelber translated the tale as Das Geheimnis des weißen Vogels ("The Secret of the White Bird"). In his translation, the third sister goes through the red gate, the gates of gold, mother-of-pearl and emerald and finds the bird; the girl agrees to be the bird's wife and returns the buffalo to her father. After the girl burns her husband's featherskin, her husband, in human form, tells her that the old woman was a messenger from the gods and devils. After the husband disappears, the old woman comes and advises the girl to keep looking for her husband. At the end of the tale, the girl is risen to the sky and meets her husband there.

German theologue Johann Andreas Christian Löhr translated the Kalmyk tale as Die weiße Eule ("The White Owl"), wherein the bird the maiden marries is explicitly identified as a white owl.

=== Buryat people ===
Researcher Nadežda Šarakšinova reported a Buryat language translation of The Bewitched Corpse with 22 tales. In this version, the tale is numbered 5 and its title is translated as The Woman who Had a Bird Husband.

=== Romani people ===
Transylvania linguist Heinrich von Wlislocki collected a Romani tale from Siebenbürgen (Transylvania), which he considered to be related to the tale from the Siddi-Kur. In the Romani tale, titled O coro rom te pinsteri or Der arme Zigeuner und die Taube ("The Poor Gypsy Man and the Dove"), a father lives with his three sons who work for a local lord, the eldest grazes the horses, the middle one the cattle and the youngest the pigs. When the horses vanish one day, the eldest tries to find them and passes through a set of doors: a wooden one, an iron one, a silver one, then a golden one, and sees a white dove on a table. The dove talks to him and says it can find the horse if the boy marries her. He declines, telling her that he already has a sweetheart. The same thing happens to the middle brother. When the youngest brother meets the white dove, the boy agrees to marry her. He begins to live with the dove, eating the best food and drinking the best drinks, until he gets bored and wishes to see human people again. The dove tells him that the king will be part of a three-day festival in the plains, and he can go there to have fun. The boy finds some money and buys finer clothes to join the people at the festival. When night comes, a young woman clad in golden clothes appears and enjoys the festivities. After the boy returns to the dove, he tells the bird about the maiden at the festival. The next day, the boy sits on a rock by the stream and sighs over the golden maiden. A frog tells him that the golden maiden is the white dove, changed into an animal by an evil sorcerer, and that he can burn her dove feathers when she goes to the festival. That night, the boy waits for his wife to go to the festival and burns the dove feathers. He breaks the enchantment and lives happily with his wife.

=== Hui people ===
In a similar tale from the Hui people, recorded in 1980 in Ningxia with the title Yaya and the Golden Sparrow, at the foot of Jing Mountain (Golden Mountain), a girl named Yaya finds a hurt golden sparrow and brings it home to heal. She places him a birdcage with a twig inside, feeds it until it recovers, and the bird, in appreciation, sings a song to her. One day, Yaya goes to the garden and sees a "smart fellow" smiling at her. She shyly runs back home and sees the sparrow with a blank stare. Some time later, there is a horse race competition at the village, and the same smart fellow rushes in on a white horse, gives Yaya a bouquet of red peonies, and vanishes from view. When she returns home the same day, the little sparrow sings about red peonies. A few days later, an old woman tells her that the girl should burn the sparrow in the birdcage, since it is the "embodiment" of that same smart fellow. Caught in a dilemma, she thinks hard about a decision, but chooses to throw the little bird in the fire. As it burns, it sings a sorrowful song, and Yaya takes it out of the flames to clean it feathers. She closes her eyes and falls into a dream-like state, where the same smart fellow appears to her in a vision: his name is Alifu, a boy servant in heaven, and he was the sparrow, a form he was cursed with as penance for misdeeds; the old woman is a fox spirit that wishes to do him harm. He also explains that, if she wants to see him again, she should go to the top of Jing Mountain 3 times a day and pray 365 times each time, for 365 days, without missing a day. She follows his guidance and, a year alter, the Golden Sparrow comes to take her to a heavenly garden. However, the evil fox spirit strikes one last time: he disguises himself as a soldier and breaks into Alifu's house in heaven to kill Yaya, but Alifu fights him to a standstill. Suddenly, a dark cloud fulminates the fox spirit with lightning, and Yaya and Alifu are freed to live their lives in peace.

== Analysis ==
=== Tale type ===
The tale has been related by scholarship to the international tale type ATU 425, "The Search for the Lost Husband", of the international Aarne-Thompson-Uther Index. (Note: Folklorist Lev Barag stated that the tale, also known as Im Besitz eines Flügelkleides, is one of the oldest attestations of type 425.) These tales refer to a marriage between a human woman and a husband of supernatural origin that appears in animal shape. Sometimes the human wife tries to break the enchantment by destroying the husband's animal skin, but he vanishes and she must undergo a penance to get her husband back.

According to philologist researcher Irina S. Nadbitova, from the Kalmyk Institute for Humanities research RAS, a similar narrative exists in the Kalmyk Folktale Corpus, with two variants she listed. Nadbitova classified it as type 432, "Финист – ясный сокол" ("Finist, the Bright Falcon", the name of a Russian fairy tale).

=== Related tales ===
According to Lörincz, in a Tibetan language translation of The Bewitched Corpse, titled Ro-sgruṅ (published by professor Damdinsuren), tales nr. 4 and nr. 9 (out of 21 of the compilation) are tales about animal husbands. As such, they can be classified as tale type ATU 425 and its subtypes.

Hungarian Mongolist Ágnes Birtalan translated the tales collected by linguist Gábor Bálint in the 19th century from Kalmyk sources. The third tale of his collection, named Moγǟ köwǖn ("The snake-lad") by Birtalan, also contains the animal husband tale: the heroine marries a snake that becomes a man; her sisters burn his snakeskin, causing his disappearance; later, the heroine quests for him and rides a deer's antlers to reach the heavens, where she finds her three sisters-in-law.

== Adaptations ==
English author Frederick James Gould adapted the tale as For Another's Sake, and published it in his book Stories for Moral Instruction. In his work, the girls' lost goat is the reason they meet the white bird inside the chamber.

== See also ==
- The Bird Lover
- The Girl Langa Langchung and the Rooster
