= Tibetan autobiography =

Tibetan autobiography, or, rangnam (Tibetan: ་་རང་རྣམ, ་Wylie: rang-rnam), is a form of autobiography native to Tibetan Buddhism.

== Origins ==
Although autobiography is traditionally considered to be a Western genre, the Tibetan autobiography arose separately from the Western form, with examples of the genre dating back to as early as the eleventh century, with a significant increase in production in the sixteenth century and a boom in the nineteenth and twentieth centuries. Unlike many other branches of Tibetan literature which originated in Indic or Chinese culture, there are no analogous genres in either canon. However, according to Janet Gyatso, "there remains a possible influence from Persian Islamic literature, in which didactic religious autobiographies are also known from the tenth century onwards, but such a connection remains to be demonstrated" (Gyatso 1992, 467).

== Tone ==
Throughout the canon of Tibetan autobiography, authors present a wide span of attitudes towards themselves and their accounts of their lives, ranging from extraordinarily self-deprecating to excessively self-praising. Tertöns tend towards humility and self-deprecation, typically stemming from uncertainty in their realizations in treasure revelation. On the opposite side of the spectrum, many authors, such as Kalu Rinpoche detail numerous acts of compassion and great meditative abilities in their autobiographies, while others add hagiographical elements to their autobiographies to elevate perceptions of them. While this variety in tone typically stems from the autobiographer himself, disciples do frequently impact tone (See Authorship) and add honorific titles in praise of their instructors.

== Subgenres ==
=== Secret autobiography ===
Tibetan: གསན་བའི་རང་རྣམ་, Wylie: gsan-ba'i rang rnam

Similarly to secret biography within Namtar, secret autobiography focuses on inner religious experiences, such as visions, realizations, and spiritual thoughts.

=== Inner autobiography ===
Tibetan: ནང་གི་རང་རྣམ་, Wylie: nang gi rang rnam

The inner autobiography contains details on meditative cycles and initiations.

=== Outer autobiography ===
Tibetan: ཕྱའི་རང་རྣམ་, Wylie: phyi'i rang rnam

Much like in the outer biography within Namtar, the outer autobiography reflects upon the writer's "publicly observable deeds—such as childhood events, education, travels...although...the outer account can reflect on inner thoughts and feelings as well" (use the footnoted gyatso or do i need to use Harvard style bracketing?).

== Religious context ==
The majority of Tibetan autobiographers were Buddhist practitioners who wrote about their personal experiences for their instructional value to their disciples, as well as any other readers. However, although most autobiographers were members of the clergy, members of all classes and religiosity have written autobiography. Because of the emphasis of this genre as a means of teaching, the author's discussion of self does not conflict with Buddhist doctrine. Instructional and directive elements within Tibetan literature are also found in other genres, such as in mGur poetry, where, in some cases, Buddhist teachings and popular themes were combined as a means of better propagating the Dharma. Reflection through both outer and inner autobiography also provides a means for authors to legitimize their other writings and demonstrate spiritual progress.
Tibetan autobiographers frequently include accounts of past lives, which in addition to glorifying and legitimating the author's actions, models Buddhist Jataka tales.

== Authorship ==
While autobiography is traditionally considered to be an account of someone's life written by the subject of the work, authorship in Tibetan autobiography frequently blends material written by the subject with that of other authors. Especially given the role of many Tibetan autobiographers as instructors and teachers, disciples often influence autobiographical content. Many autobiographers dictate their autobiographies to their students, who, in turn, tend to add their own elements to the work. While more blatantly EXTERNAL components, such as chapters regarding the death of the autobiographer, as in the autobiographies of Milarepa and Orgyan Chokyi, are regularly added by disciples, less obvious additions blur the distinction between autobiographer and disciple even further.

Disciples often add honorific titles in praise of the autobiographer attesting to the merit of their teacher, which would superficially seem to be an obvious external contribution; however, Tibetan autobiographers exhibit a wide array of egotism, ranging from the expected Buddhist diffidence to grandiose self-admiration (see Tone. Components that would be expected to come directly from the autobiographer, such as accounts of dreams and visions in the secret autobiography, may, in some cases, actually be recorded by disciples that learned of them orally.

== Related genres ==
=== Terma Literature ===
Stemming from the Nyingma school of Buddhism, Terma (Tibetan: གཏེར་མ་, Wylie: gter ma; "hidden treasure") literature consists of systematically hidden "treasures", "blessed words and objects said to originate in the enlightened intent of buddhas and bodhisattvas". (Doctor, 17) intended to be discovered by a predestined tertön, a treasure revealer, at a designated time in the future when the information will be most pertinent to the Tibetan people.

=== Namtar ===
A namtar (Tibetan: རྣམ་ཐར་, Wylie: rNam-thar), sometimes spelled namthar is a spiritual biography or hagiography in Tibetan Buddhism.

Namtar is a contraction of nampar tharpa (Tibetan: རྣམ་པར་ཐར་པ་, Wylie: rnam-par thar-pa), which literally means 'complete liberation', which, similarly to the cases of the vast majority of Tibetan autobiographers, refers to the genre's focus on individuals who have achieved total enlightenment.

As in Tibetan autobiography, Namtar is divided into three subcategories, all of which are present in every work of Namtar:

- The outer biography (Tibetan: ཕྱའི་རྣམ་ཐར་, Wylie: phyi'i rnam-thar), containing descriptions of birth, education and consulted texts.
- The inner biography (Tibetan: ནན་གི་རྣམ་ཐར་, Wylie: nan-gi rnam-thar), containing details on meditative cycles and initiations.
- The secret biography (Tibetan: གསན་བའི་རྣམ་ཐར་, Wylie: gsan-ba'i rnam-thar), said to describe the meditative state of the siddha.

== Notable autobiographers ==
=== Jigme Lingpa ===
Jigme Lingpa was a noteworthy tertön - a revealer of terma texts - from the Nyingma sect of Buddhism who lived in the 18th century (from wiki page). In addition to his autobiography, his body of work includes his "Heart Sphere" writings, nine-volume "Collected Works", and various works on Tibetan history.

=== Milarepa ===
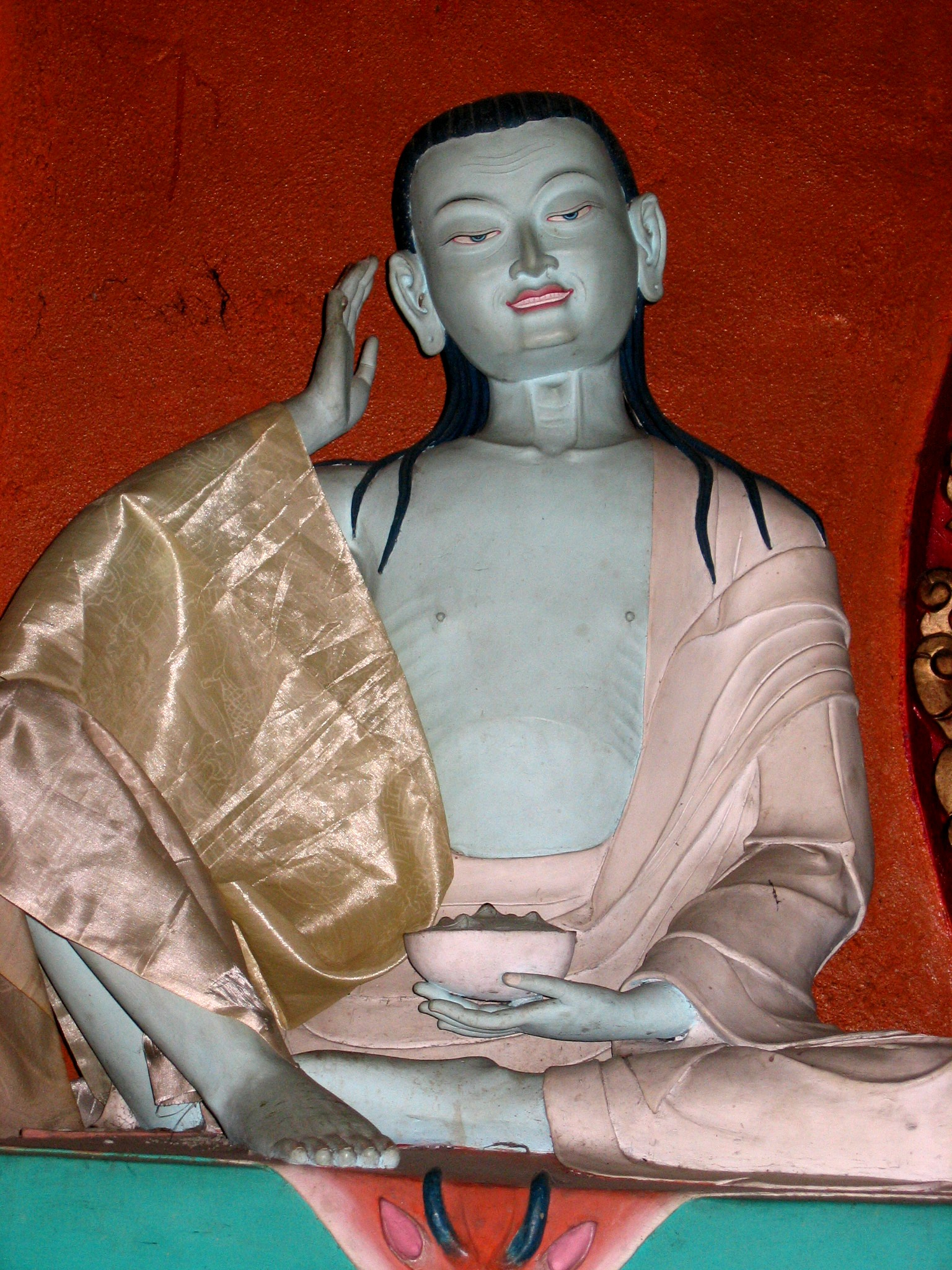
A statue of Jetsun Milarepa from the Milarepa Gompa, Helambu valley, Hyolmo, Nepal.

The autobiography of Milarepa documents the autobiographer's life and his transformation from representing the epitome of an immortal life to enlightenment through devout tantric Buddhist practices. After significant abuse throughout his childhood from greedy relatives, Milarepa commits mass slaughter against those who wronged him, as well as other acts of black magic; his ability to find salvation in the dharma despite his severe wrongdoing shows how, through adherence to Buddhism, anyone can reach enlightenment.

=== Orgyan Chokyi ===
Born in 1675, Orgyan Chokyi is the earliest known female Tibetan autobiographer, one of only three or four total out of around 150 known Tibetan autobiographers . Her work primarily focuses on suffering and impermanence of life, as well as gender roles within both Tibetan and Buddhist culture. An important concept that Orgyan Chokyi deals with in the gendering of suffering, claiming an intrinsic connection between the female body and Samsara and suffering.

== See also ==
- Tibetan Literature
- See this link for a number of autobiographies of Tibetans born in the 20th Century.
