= The Girl Langa Langchung and the Rooster =

Tibetan tale

The Girl Langa Langchung and the Rooster is a Tibetan tale published as part of the compilation of The Golden Corpse (Tibetan: Mi ro gser sgrung), a compilation of tales popular in Tibet. Scholars relate it to the cycle of the Animal as Bridegroom or The Search for the Lost Husband: a human woman marries a supernatural husband in animal form and, after losing him, has to seek him out.

== Origin ==
The Golden Corpse is a compilation of Indo-Tibetan stories that was later brought to Mongolia and translated into Mongolic languages. The collection is known in India as Vetala Pañcaviṃśati, in Tibet as Ro-sgrung, in Mongolia as Siditü kegür, and in Oirat as Siddhi kǖr.

In this regard, Mongolian linguist Tsendiin Damdinsüren noted the existence of two Tibetan compilations of Vetala tales, one with 13 chapters and the other with 21. Also, both versions were mentioned in the work The Book of the Son, written in the 11th century. Lastly, the divergence in contents between the Indian Vetala and the Tibetan versions, according to Damdinsuren, may indicate the latter were original works, instead of an adaptation or translation. In the same vein, according to Tibetologist Françoise Robin, there are more than 20 versions of the compilation in the Tibetan-speaking zone alone, and their common versions contain between thirteen and twenty-five stories, with some even reaching up to 75 tales.

== Summary ==
In this tale, an old couple lives with their three daughters and their flock of sheep. One day, the husband goes to graze the cattle, when a demon appears, kills the man, and wears his face as a disguise. The false husband goes back home with a story that he met a potential rich suitor for his daughters and gives the woman some fat to be cooked for their meal. Unaware that the fat belongs to her dead husband, the woman roasts it, but a voice warns her the fat is her dead husband's. The demon's next victims are the couple's elder and middle daughter, whom he kills on the hill and brings their fat for the woman to cook, lying that they are sheep's fat to celebrate their daughters' betrothal to rich men. After he brings the middle daughter's fat, the woman suggests they live with their youngest daughter, instead of sending her away to be married, but the false husband suggests she is married off before the couple dies. The next day, the false husband takes the youngest daughter, Langa Langchung, to the hill to be killed off, and tells her to wait there while he goes to search for her suitor. Suddenly, a little dog comes out of the bushes and asks to be given food in exchange for secrets: a mouthful for a secret. Langa Langchung shares with the dog the meal her mother prepared for her, and the dog reveals three secrets: the girl's father is a demon who killed her true father and sisters and hid their skulls nearby. In addition, the dog gives her a pot with instructions on how to escape the demon: roll the pot down a hill and follow it, paying no heed to the demon's calls for her to return.

Langa follows the pot until it stops by some sacks of cow dung. Underneath them, she finds a trapdoor, which leads to a ladder, and further down leads to a storeroom where a rooster bids her enter and sate her hunger and thirst. The next day, the rooster tells her to wear some fine clothes and enjoy herself at a nearby gala. She does exactly that and leaves the storeroom. After she leaves, the rooster removes its birdskin, becomes a youth, and joins the others at the gala. Langa celebrates with the other revellers and spots the youth among the guests. The youth then makes a return to the storeroom and puts on the rooster disguise to welcome Langa. The girl tells the rooster she met a handsome youth named Japho Tsilu at the gala, who greatly interested her. Some days later, the rooster tells Langa there is another gala which she should attend. Langa also attends the gala, and so does Japho Tsilu in human form. Langa returns from the second gala and comments that a "rooster" Tsilu was the most handsome man there, and she was the most beautiful woman. Later, the rooster announces there is yet another gala, which it bids Langa to attend. The girl, suspecting the rooster is "Tsalu" from the gala, pretends to go to the gala and hides in a corner: she watches as the rooster takes off the rooster's skin to become the human youth and goes to join the people at the fair. Langa, who stayed behind, burns the rooster's skin. Japho returns from the fair and finds that Langa burnt his rooster disguise. In despair, he tells her it could not have been burnt for another ten years and now they cannot be together, but there is something Langa can do: he gives her his tutelary deity and tells her to go to a house that lies facing the East, where its dogs will recognize her and his mother will welcome her in.

Langa does as instructed and walks to Japho's mother's house with the deity, introducing herself as a beggar woman whose father and elder sister were devoured by a demon. Japho's mother says her son has been missing for five years, and takes Langa in. Sometime later, Langa has a dream wherein a lama asks what Langa wants. She explains she wants the ability to reach out to Japho Tsalu, her husband, and the lama says he can help her. The next morning, she feels she is pregnant, and Japho's mother questions her about the child's father. Langa simply answers about her auspicious dreams, and none of the servants is her baby's father. Days later, a man in a red horse red garments and accompanied by a red dog appears at the woman's house: it is Japho Tsalu, who asks Langa if she has a soft pillow, a good blanket, and a good bed, and if she is eating nourishing food. Langa says she is sleeping on a belt pillow, with no woolen blanket, nor soft mattress. Japho Tsalu then explains that the demons caught his soul after the rooster's skin and made to be their servant, first their tea man, then their chamber master, until being demoted to horse herder. This new position allows him to meet with Langa away from the demons' view.

The next day, Japho's mother is informed by the servants there was some one in the room with Langa, and questions her about it. Langa admits she met a man she fell in love with, but her mistake separated them. Out of pity, Japho's mother moves Langa to better accommodations. The next time Japho visits her, Langa says she is sleeping in a soft and comfortable bed, and wishes he could be there permanently. However, Japho explains there is a guardian of the demons that is impossible to escape, but if one is to come for him, he can be saved. That same night, Langa has another dream with the lama, and he gives her a turquoise and instructions on how to rescue Japho Tsalu: she is to go to a hill and hold a stag's horn, place the turquoise on her mouth and keep meditating on the lama. She is to pay no attention to a hundred red knights galloping from the right and another hundred from the left, and a large red knight with a scorpion head that will come to hinder her.

The next day, Langa goes to the hill with the stag's horn and starts the ritual according to the lama's instructions. Meanwhile, the lama turns into a blue horse and goes to retrieve Japho Tsalu while the latter is fetching water from a pond. The lama takes Japho back home, while Langa holds the fort and meditates on the lama, the red knights and the scorpion-headed man trying to stop her, to no avail, since she keeps her concentration long enough for the creatures to cease their efforts and leave them be. After the demons leave, Langa reunites with Japho Tsalu, and his mother faints with happiness at seeing him safe and sound. Langa marries king Japho Tsalu and they rule the kingdom.

== Analysis ==
=== Tale type ===
The tale has been related by scholarship to the international tale type ATU 425, "The Search for the Lost Husband", of the international Aarne-Thompson-Uther Index. (Note: Folklorist Lev Barag stated that the tale, also known as Im Besitz eines Flügelkleides, is one of the oldest attestations of type 425.) These tales refer to a marriage between a human woman and a husband of supernatural origin that appears in animal shape. Sometimes the human wife tries to break the enchantment by destroying the husband's animal skin, but he vanishes and she must undergo a penance to get her husband back.

== Variants ==
According to Hungarian scholar Lazsló Lörincz, variants of the story appear in Tibetan Ro-sgrung, either in compilations of thirteen tales or of twenty-one. Despite this difference, Lörincz considered both tales to be "identical".

In the version with 21 tales, the story appears as tale nr. 9, Bu-mo Slaṅ-ṅa slaṅ-čhun srin-mo'i kha-nas thar-te rgyal-srid bzuṅ-ba'i le'u bzugs-so ("The Tale about how the maiden Slan-na fled the demon's mouth and gained the throne)": the heroine's father and sisters are devoured by a demon, but she escapes with the aid a dog and meets a talking rooster; the rooster is an enchanted human whose disguise she burns and causes him to fall under the power of demons; with the help of deity Rta-mgrin (Hayagriva), transmogrified to a horse, she saves her beloved.

In the versions with 13 stories, it appears as tale numbered 7, titled Bya-šubs-čan-gyi le’u-ste ("The Tale of the Man in Birdskin"): the heroine meets the rooster, who is a man under the birdskin; she burns the birdskin and he comes under the power of demons; she fashions a new birdskin for him. Lörincz distinguished between literary and folkloric (oral) versions of this narrative: in the Tibetan redaction, the bird husband is identified as a rooster; in the literary versions, the three girls search for the lost cattle, whereas in oral versions the cattle just disappears.

=== The Feathered Prince ===
In a variant translated as "Царевич в птичьей оболочке" ("The Prince in Bird Skin") or The Feathered Prince, three orphaned sisters live together and earn their living by milking their female buffalo and selling its milk and butter. One day, the animal disappears, and the elder sister goes looking for it. After a while, she sits by a rock near a cave. A little bird appears to her and begs for some food, and asks her to marry it. The elder sister refuses and returns home. The next day, the middle sister goes to look for the animal and rests by the same stone, and the same white bird propositions her, but she declines. Lastly, the youngest sister agrees to marry the white bird, and he directs her into the cave. Inside, magnificent and richly decorated rooms appear before her with every door she opens. At last, the little bird perches upon a couch and tells her that their buffalo was devoured by an evil raksha. The girl begins to live there as the white bird's wife, tidying the place and preparing the food. Some time later, a festival is held in a nearby village, with musicians, equestrian games, and all sorts of amusement. The white bird's wife goes to the festival, and sees a handsome youth on a gray horse, who gazes at her. The girl leaves the festival and meets an old woman. The girl pours out her woes to her, lamenting over the fact that her husband is just a little bird, but the old woman reassures her that the youth at the festival was her husband, and that she only has to burn his bird disguise the next time. The girl follows the old woman's instructions the next day, and burns the bird skin. The same night, her husband (in human form) comes home and asks her about the bird skin. The girl tells him she burned the birdskin, and the man reveals he is a prince, and that the birdskin was to protect him from an evil witch. Saying this, a whirlwind comes and takes the prince. The girl tries to find him and wanders through valleys and deserts, until she finds him one day near a temple, carrying jugs of water and wearing faded boots. The prince tells her to get feathers from all species of bird for a new bird coat, and, once she has fashioned it, she must chant a special prayer for him to return to her. Saying his, he disappears. The girl returns to their cave palace and gathers all feathers she can must, fashions a new bird skin and chants the correct chant to summon her husband back to her. He appears and both live happily.

=== Bird who Turned into a Prince ===
In a variant published by Tibetologist David MacDonald with the title The Story of the Bird who turned into a Prince, in the land of Mo-tshul, an old farmer lives with his three daughters; the three sisters pass by a red door, a gold door and a turquoise door and meet the bird on a throne; the youngest sister marries the bird and burns his feathered cloak; she does penance to try to save her husband by standing at a door and turning a "devil-stick" or "devil-rod"; after her husband vanishes, she finds him in the summit of a hill, and he explains he must wear out a pair of boots by traveling at the behest of the devils. She saves her husband by fashioning a new feathered cloak and by saying fervent prayers, until he appears at their door.

=== The White Bird's Wife ===
Author Eleanore Myers Jewett translated the tale as The White Bird's Wife and sourced it from Tibet. In her translation, the youngest daughter is named Ananda.

=== The White Rooster ===
Authors Fredrick Hyde-Chambers and Audrey Hyde-Chambers translated a Tibetan tale with the title The White Rooster. In this tale, a widow lives with her three daughters, Pema, Tsokyi and Dekyi, the three equally beautiful. They live in a small house near the edge of a lake, and take their yaks to graze. One day, Pema takes the yaks to pasture, but hears a loud sound and gets distracted. When she turns to check on the animals, they have disappears. Desperate, the girl searches high and low for the animals, and enters a cave; inside, she finds jewels and finely decorated doors she passes through, until she finds a large throne room at the end of the cave, a large white rooster sat on a cushion. The rooster greets Pema and says he can help her find the missing yaks, as long as she agrees to be the bird's wife. Pema declines his offer and returns home empty-handed. The next day, the middle sister, Tsokyi, traces her sister's footsteps to the rooster and is also proposed with marriage, which she also refuses. Finally, the youngest sister, Dekyi, goes to the cave to meet the rooster and agrees to become his wife. The rooster points to the place where she can find the roosters, and bids her returns before sunset, now that she is to become the rooster's wife. It happens thus: Dekyi's family retrieves the yak herd, while she goes to live in the cave with the rooster. Some time later, a horse-racing contest is announced to he held at a nearby town, with festivities and a gathering of people. Dekyi herself goes to the events, wearing fine clothes and the people barely recognize her. During the races, a mysterious rider on an ice-blue horse beats the competition and gazes at Dekyi with some familiarity. Dekyi goes home to the rooster. On the last day of the festival, Dekyi meets with an old woman and tells her about her marriage, to which the old woman gives a cryptic message about things not being what they appear. Dekyi then goes back to the cave and does not find her husband, but a large rooster skin strewn about on the ground. She then realizes the rider at the race is her husband in human form, and decides to burn the rooster skin to keep him human forever. Next, the human rooster comes back and asks her about the skin, and learns his wife destroyed. Despairing at the situation, he explains that as long as he had the rooster skin, he could be protected from the demons, for he was cursed to rooster skin when he refuses to become their slave. Dekyi asks how she can still save him, and is told she is to hold a candle and bang on a door night and day for a whole week. She follows his instructions and manages to stay awake for 6 days, but falls asleep and drops the candle. When she comes to, she notices that her husband is nowhere to be found, and lives in the cave. At the end of the tale, she finds her husband again during a walk. He reveals to her he is now a slave to the demons and can never return to her, but insists she takes the jewels in their cave and go back to her family. It happens thus, and Dekyi goes back to live with her family.

=== Langa and Jatsalu ===
In a Tibetan tale titled Langa and Jatsalu, also contained in a published version of Ro-srung (2003), a family of four (father, mother and two daughters) lives in a valley. One day, the father goes to graze sheep down in the valley, when a sinpo shapeshifter appears, kills the man and wears its skin. He passes himself off as the father and tells then a distant king is looking for a bride, and suggests his eldest daughter should go. The mother adorns her elder daughter, who accompanies the false father down to the valley. The false father devours the elder daughter, and goes back home with a new lie: the king's brother wishes to marry their younger daughter, Langa. The mother prepares Langa for the journey, and the false father goes with her down a mountain pass. Seeing so many people there, the false father leaves Langa on the road. While she waits, a little white dog appears and asks for food, in exchange for telling the girl three secrets. Langa feeds the little animal, which reveals the girl's father is a shapeshifter, directs her to a cave where her father and elder sister's bones are, and gives her a plate to use to distract the shapeshifter before he has a chance to devour her. After the dog leaves, the sinpo comes back to devour her, but, following the animal's advice, she throws the plate and it rolls down the slope. She follows the plate until it stops at a burlap sack filled with cow dung. She lifts the sack and finds a pair of doors that lead underground. Langa goes down the stairs and passes by a large iron door and a large golden door, until she reaches a splendidly decorated throne room. Inside the room, a talking rooster greets her and offers food and a warm bed for her, telling her to use a small door near the bedroom wall. Langa accepts the rooster's offer, eats and sleeps for a bit, then goes out the small door: when she exits it, it leads her to a crowded marketplace. Meanwhile, the rooster at the throne room takes off his birdskin, becomes a handsome youth and rides a horse to the marketplace. Langa and the rider, named Jatsalu, spot each other and fall in love with each other, while the crowd shouts at Jatsalu to come see them. Jatsalu throws ashes and dust at the people, and drops a sack of brown sugar to distract them, then makes his way back to the throne room to put on the rooster disguise again. Langa comes back from the marketplace and comments with the rooster about the events. The next day, she opens and closes the small door to trick the rooster, and spies through a hole in the wall: the rooster takes off its skin to become Jatsalu, and makes his way to the market. While he is away, Langa burns the rooster skin. After Jatsalu returns from the market, he finds Langa, who tells him she loves him, but burned the rooster skin. Jatsalu despairs at the fact, for the skin served to protect him from his enemies, and they will find him again, so they must make the most of the night. The next day, Jatsalu directs Langa to his parents' compound, which is guarded by ferocious dogs, but she can bypass them by performing an act of kindness and keep a state of mindfulness at all times. Langa follows his instructions and reaches his parents' large house. Jatsalu's mother takes her in as a servant and comments that her own son has disappeared. That same night, Langa has a dream about the little dog, which predicts that a dransong truth-sayer will come and she must heed his words. Some time later, the house's servants notice Langa is pregnant and gossip about it to their mistress, lying that the girl must have had a dalliance with a male servant or with a shepherd. Langa denies it, and Jatsalu's mother lets her stay, though noticing the girl is indeed pregnant. Later, Langa has another dream where a rider on a red horse appears with a red dog and asks Langa if she has nice accommodations; the girl replies to the rider in the vision she does not. The next morning, Langa tells Jatsalu's mother about her son, and the woman deducts he has been kidnapped by a tsen body-snatcher. After learning of Langa's relationship with her son, the woman places her in a better room. That same night, Jatsalu comes to Langa's new bedroom and explains the tsens have made him to herd their horses and next to be their water carrier, which allowed him to sneak out and alert his wife, saying only through her skills can he be saved, then goes back to the tsens. Langa then prays fervently, and the dransong truth-sayer appears in her dream to guide her, instructing her on how to proceed. The next day, she finds deer's antlers and a turquoise in a bush, which she takes and goes to a juniper tree, and hides herself amidst some lower branches. She places the turquoise in her mouth and hold the antlers above her head, as the dransong manifests above the antlers. Langa holds her position as the tsens appear with their horse herd and circle the juniper tree, while the dransong changes shape into a blue horse and waits near a blue pond. Jatsalu appears and goes to give water to the blue horse, which says he has come to rescue him. Jatsalu mounts on the horse and escapes back to his parents' house, while Langa keeps her mindfulness among the tsens. A giant scorpion creature tries to menace her, but the girl holds her spiritual concentration and dismisses the scorpion. At last, the tsens vanish whence they came, and Langa is taken to Jatsalu's house to live with him.

=== Other tales ===
Tibetologist August Hermann Francke, in a 1923 article, reported the existence of Tibetan manuscript from the Bar-bog family from Lahul. The manuscript, titled Ňos-grub-can-gyi-sgruns, contained 13 tales, the seventh named Bya-shubs-rgyal-po (German: der König in Vogelgestalt; English: "The King in Bird-form").

According to Lörincz, M. K. Kolmaš provided the Eötvös Loránd University with a microfilm of a xylography from East Tibet. The xylographic version contained 16 tales, the ninth tale titled Rgyal-bu bya-šubs-čan-kyi leu'ste (French: Histoire du prince au corps d'oiseau; English: "Story of the Prince with the body of a bird").

== See also ==
- The Bird Lover
- The White Bird and His Wife
