= Wang Jiujiang =

Chinese landscape painter (born 1957)

- 王久江
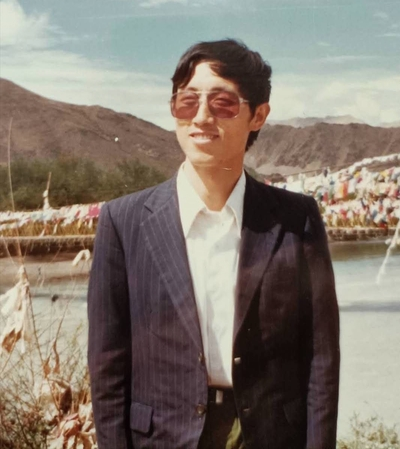
- Wang in 1983, in Tibet.
- Born: 1957 (age 68–69); Santai, Mianyang, Sichuan
- Known for: Painting
- Style: Shan shui
- Movement: Neo-shan shui
- Awards: Excellence Award of China Artists Association

Wang Jiujiang (Chinese: 王久江; pinyin: Wáng Jiǔjiāng; Wade–Giles: Wang^{2} Chiu^{3}-chiang^{1}; Zhuyin Fuhao: ㄨㄤˊ ㄐㄧㄡˇ ㄐㄧㄤ; Sichuanese romanization: Uang Chiu-chiang; pronounced /ˈwæŋ tʃiuˈtʃæŋ/) is a Sichuanese painter whose work is mostly based on the landscapes of Sichuan and Tibet, by reinterpreting the traditional shan shui style. He is classified as a member of national first-class artists.

== Career ==
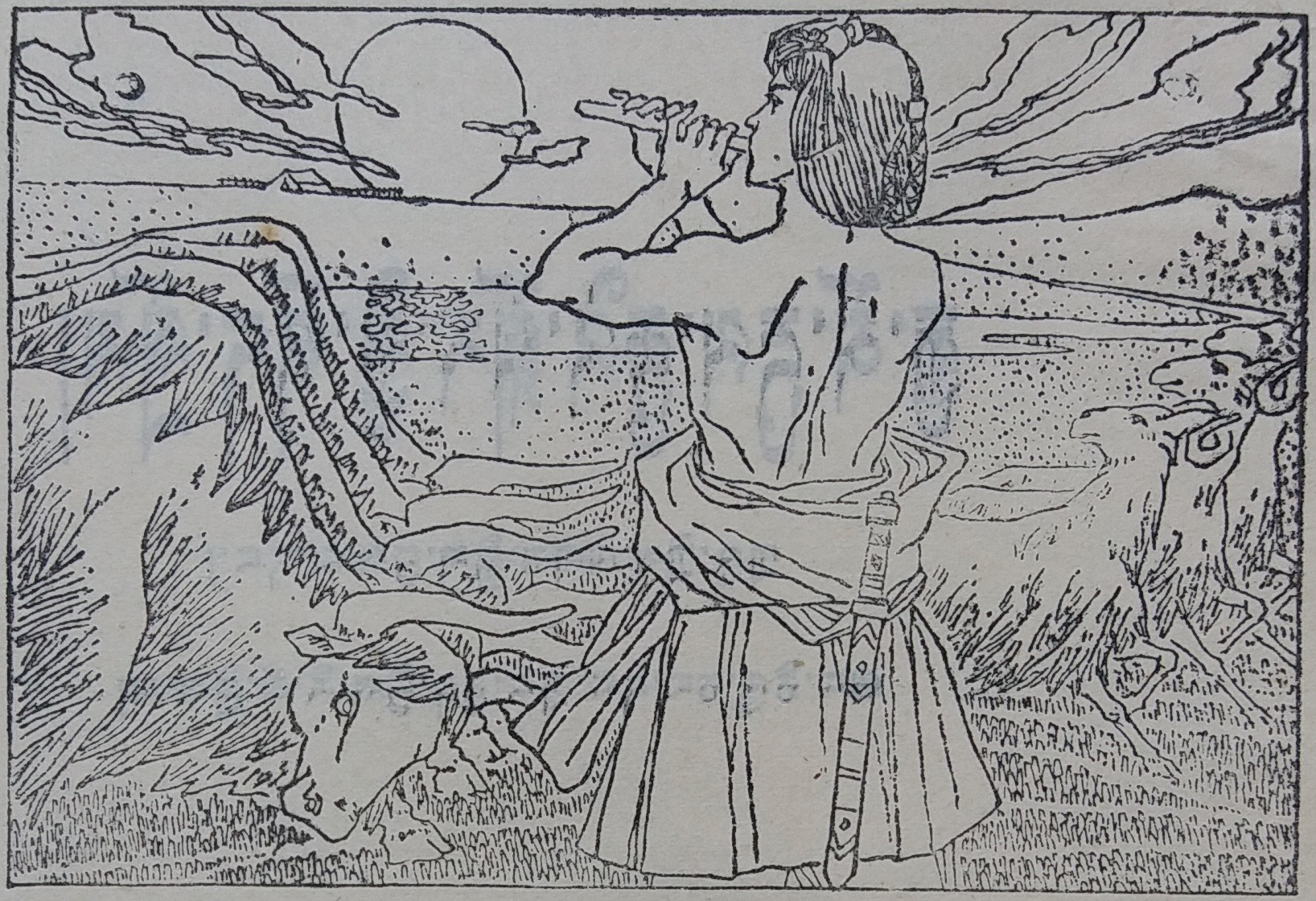
An illustration for The Swan, a picture book in Tibetan published in 1982.

Wang lived in Tibet in the 1980s, where he worked as an art director for the military district of Tibet. In 1982, he created the illustrations for two picture books recounting the Tibetan folklores, The Story of Akhu Tönpa and The Swan. The latter won a second prize in the Exhibition of Fine Arts of the Tibet Autonomous Region. In 1986, with The Eternity, a wood carving painting, he was awarded the Creative Excellence Award in the fifth Exhibition of Fine Arts of Tibet; and several of his sketches were published in the Tibetan newspaper Lhasa Evening, in the same year.

His work The Celestial Burial won the Prize of Honour in the National Competition of Genre Painting in 1988; and Autumn Melody in the Mountains of Ngawa won a third prize in the Great Contest of Chinese Paintings held in Shenzhen, in 1989. His work High Autumn, for which he received an award of excellence in 1993, has been accepted and accessioned into the collection of the Sichuan Academy of Poetry, Calligraphy, and Painting. In 2002, The Golden Plateau, a shan shui style painting, was exhibited at the National Exhibition of Chinese Paintings.

In 2003, he was awarded for the work Sutra-chanting (aka Praying, 220 cm × 126 cm)—a 'neo-shan shui' style painting—with the Excellence Award from China Artists Association, while on display in the National Exhibition of Chinese Paintings on West China Scenery.

In 2018, Cloud-wrapped Mountains over the Diexi Lake, a painting made in a relatively more traditional shan-shui style, was presented in the first Exhibition of Fine Arts of Mianyang. He also participates each year in the Ink and Wash Fucheng Invitational Art Exhibition, an annual exhibition held in Fucheng District, Mianyang.

In addition to shan shui paintings, he also created gouaches, oil paintings, and some abstract expressionist works during his years as a young adult. And he is also an antique collector.

== Critique ==
Zhang Shiying, a professional painter from Guangzhou, when speaking of the artworks of Wang, stating: 'A sensation of freshness, due to the spacious view and free spirit; a sensation of brightness, due to the absence of desolation and melancholy'.

== Gallery ==
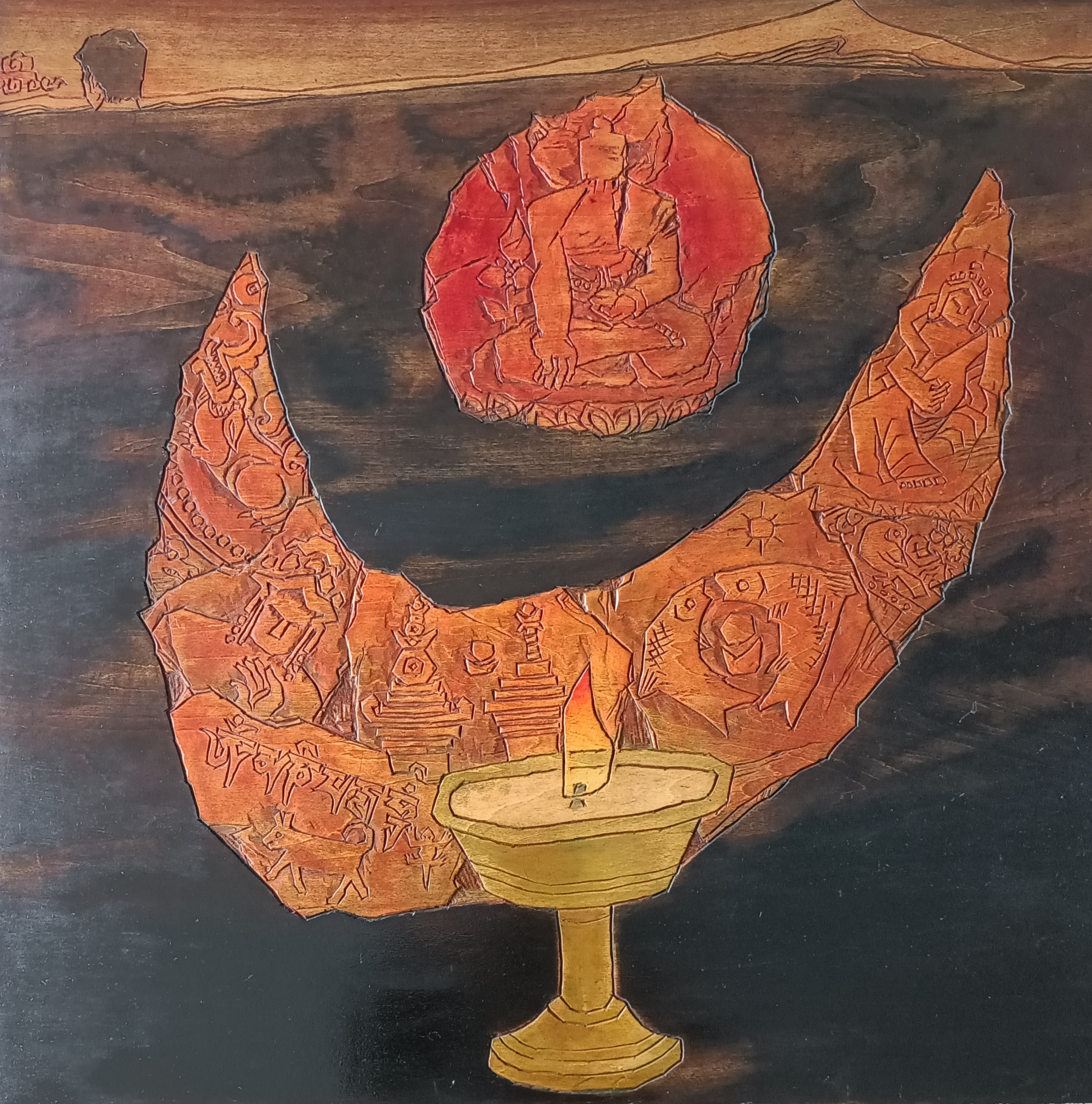
The Eternity

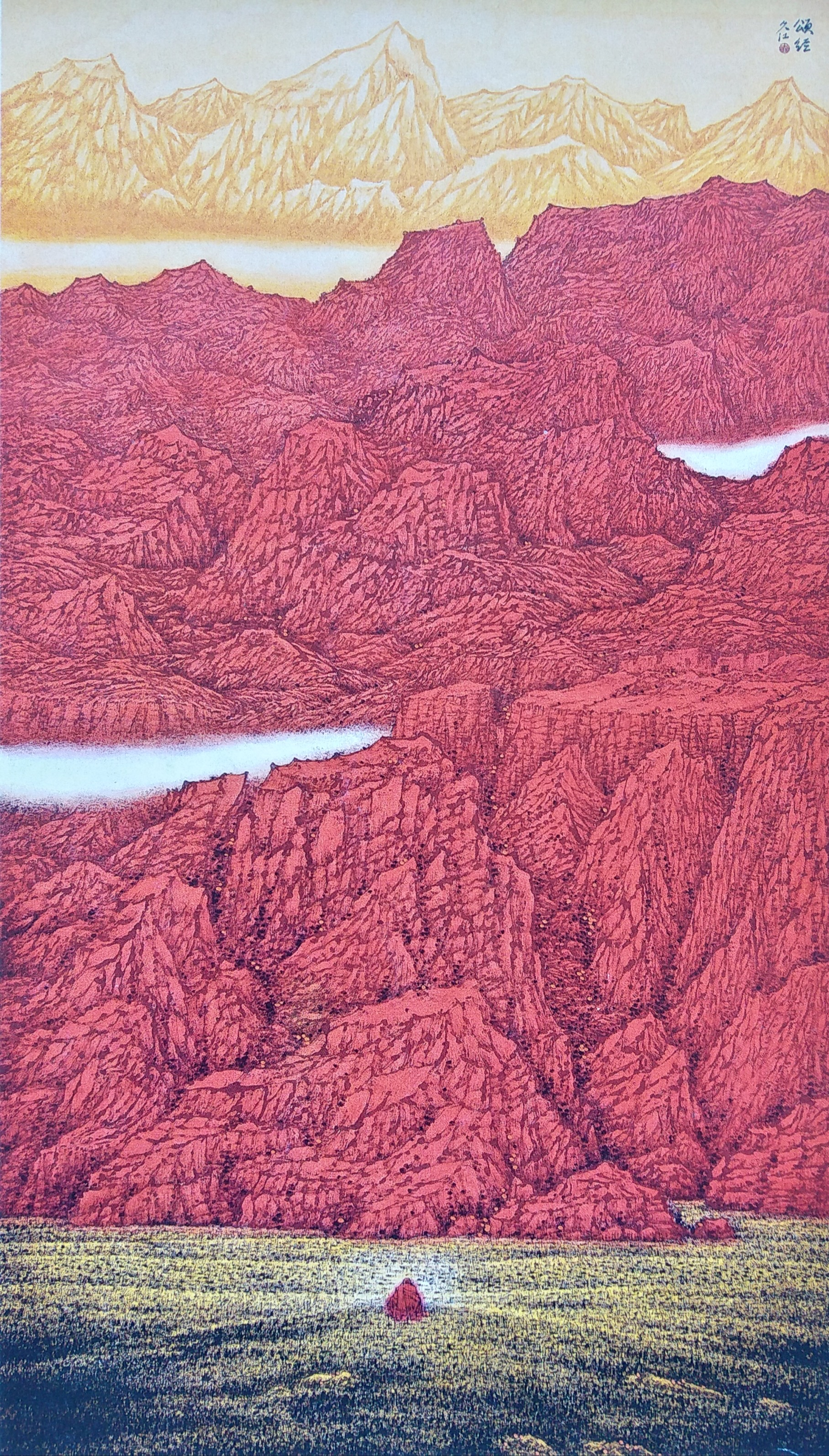
Sutra-chanting

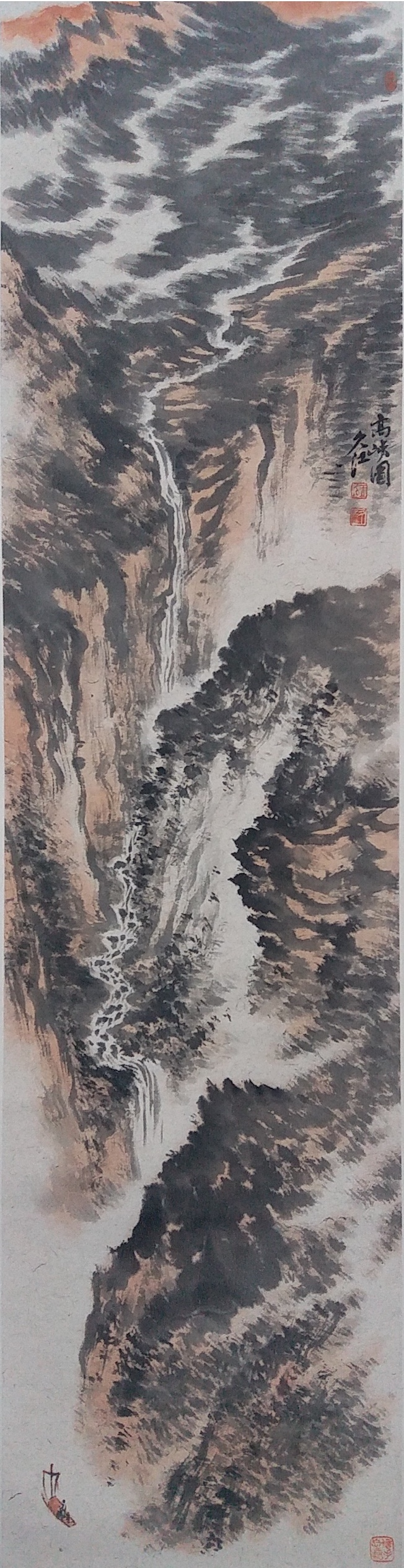
Great River Canyon

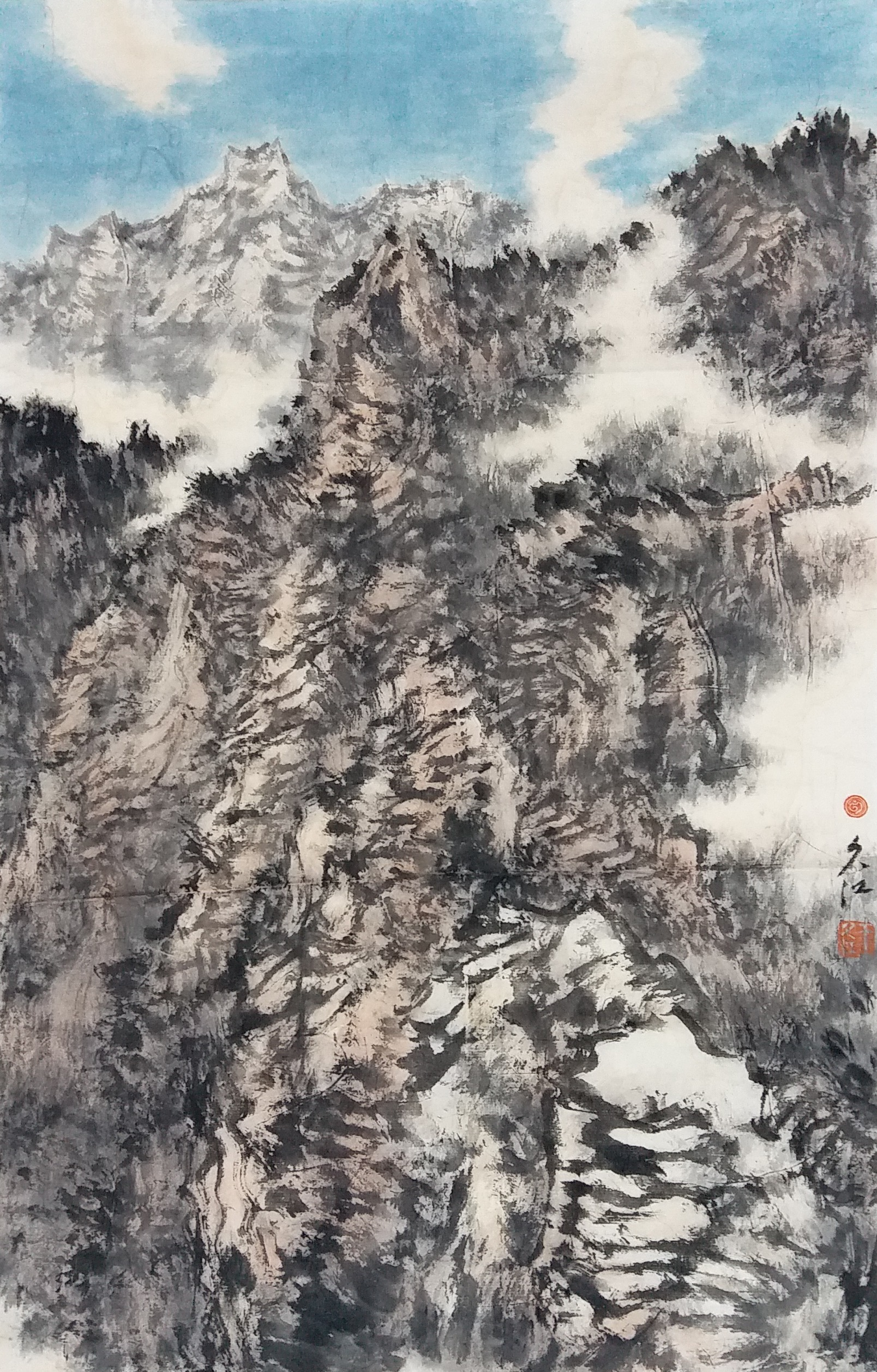
Mountains in Longnan

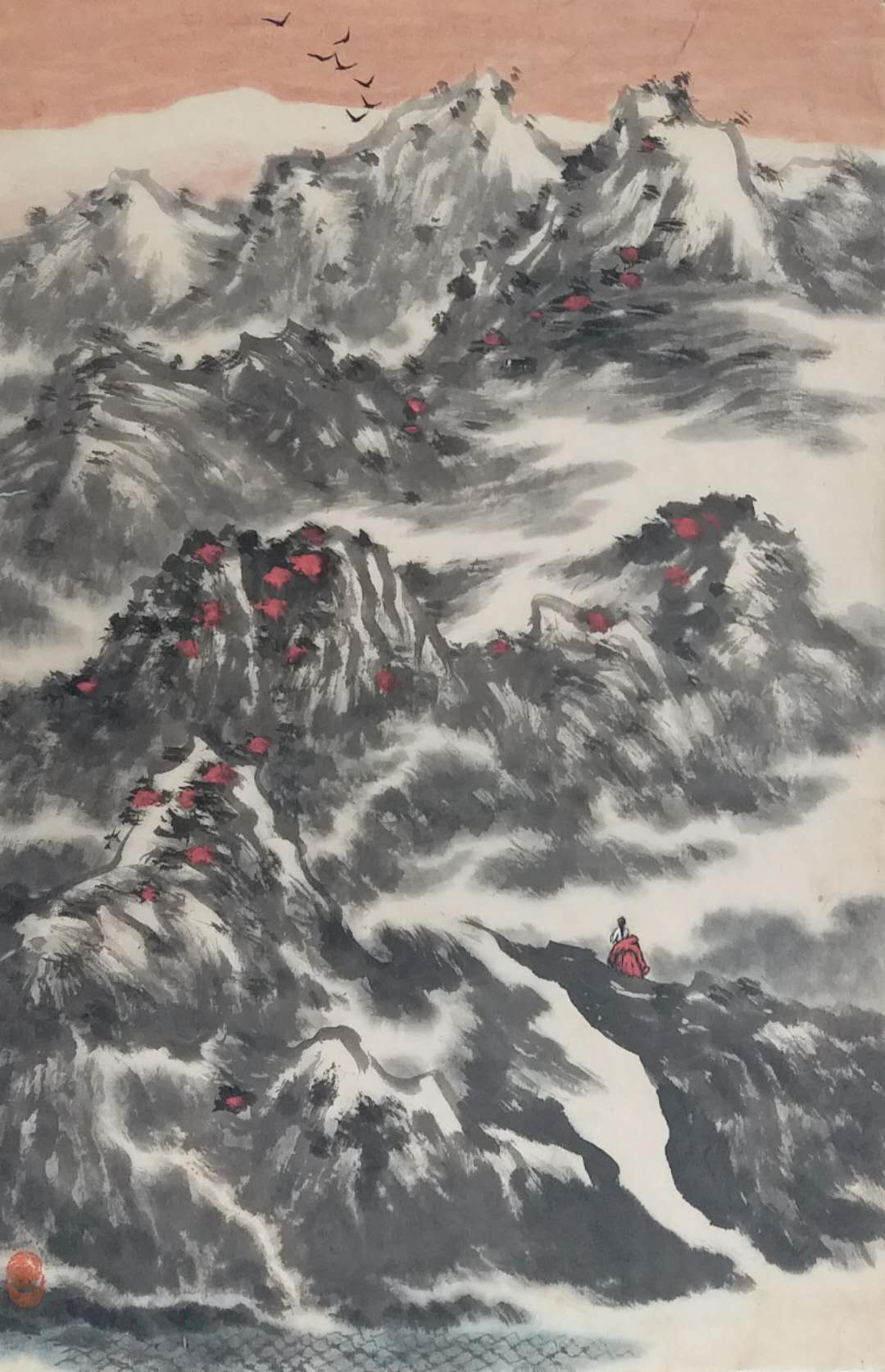
Homeland of the Hawks

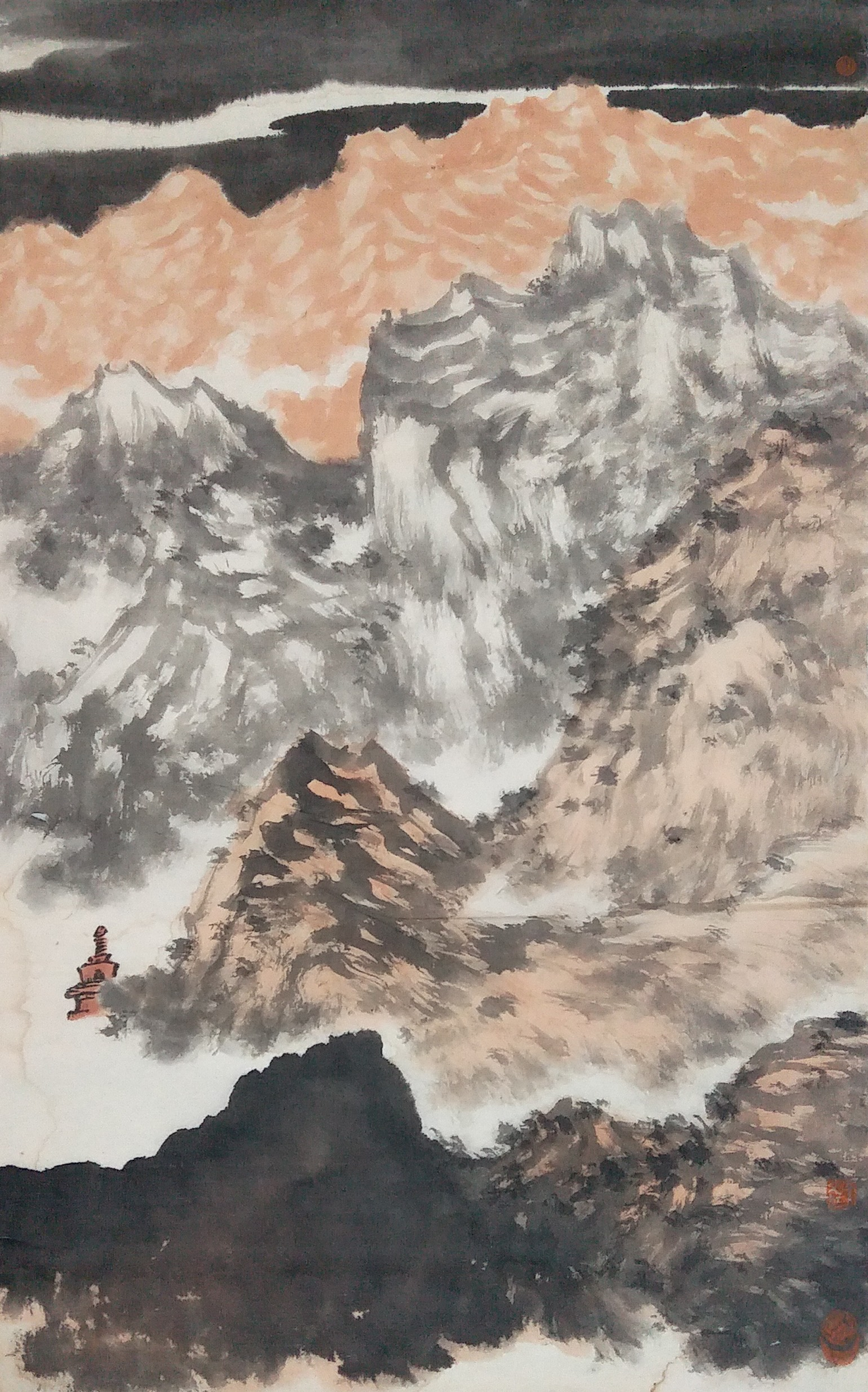
Tibetan Landscape No. 3

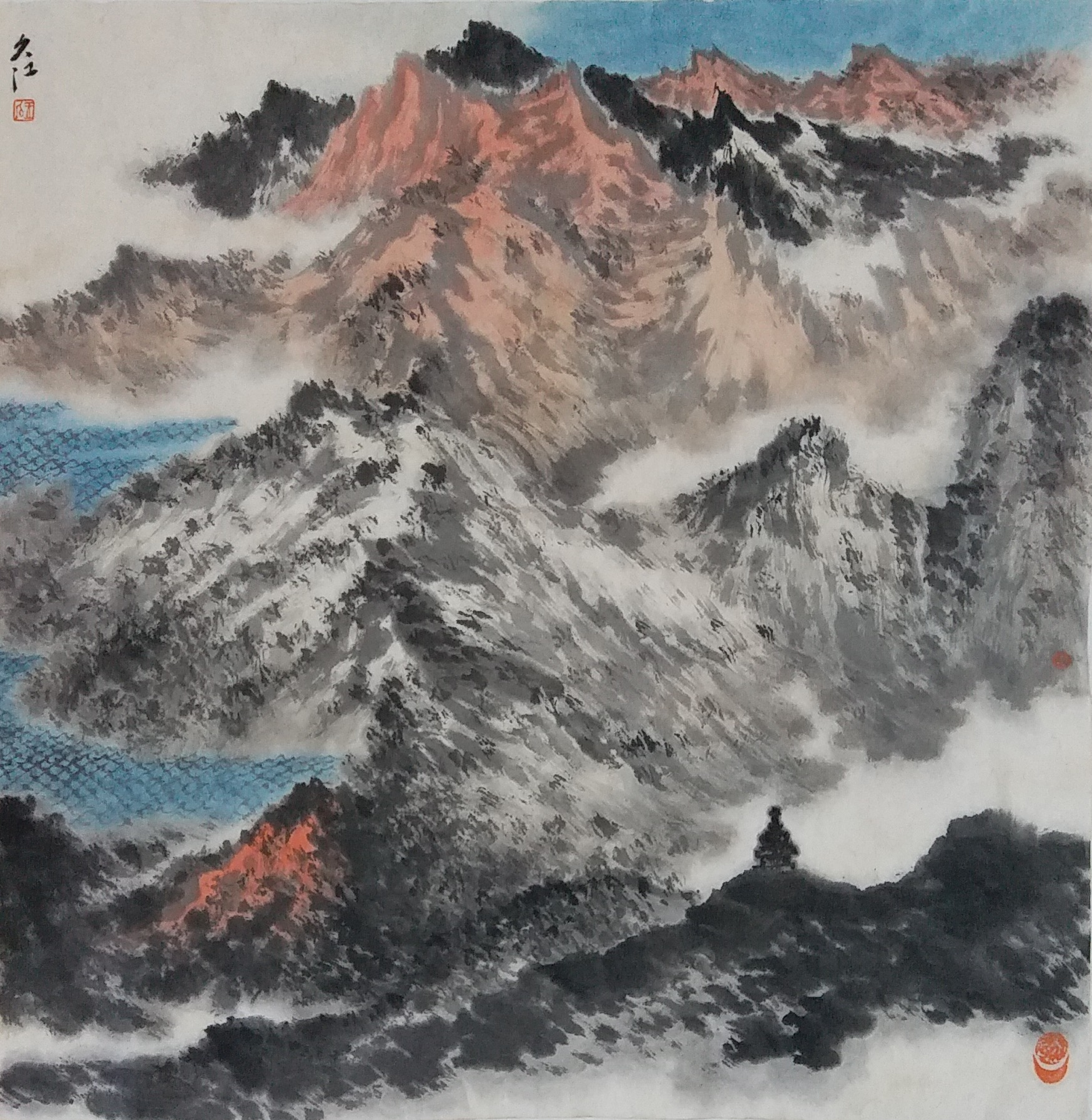
Tibetan Landscape No. 4

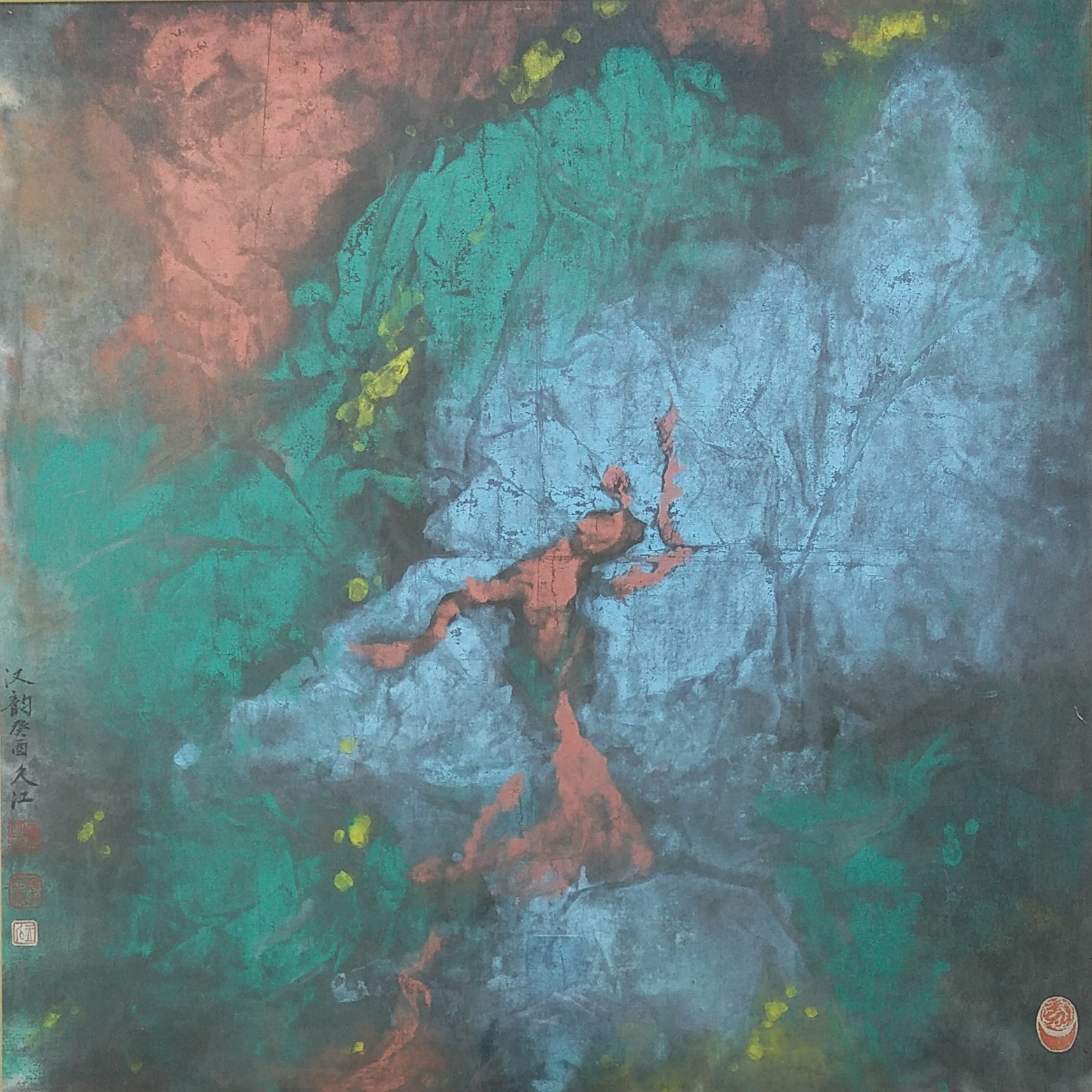
Echoes of the Han-dynasty Melody

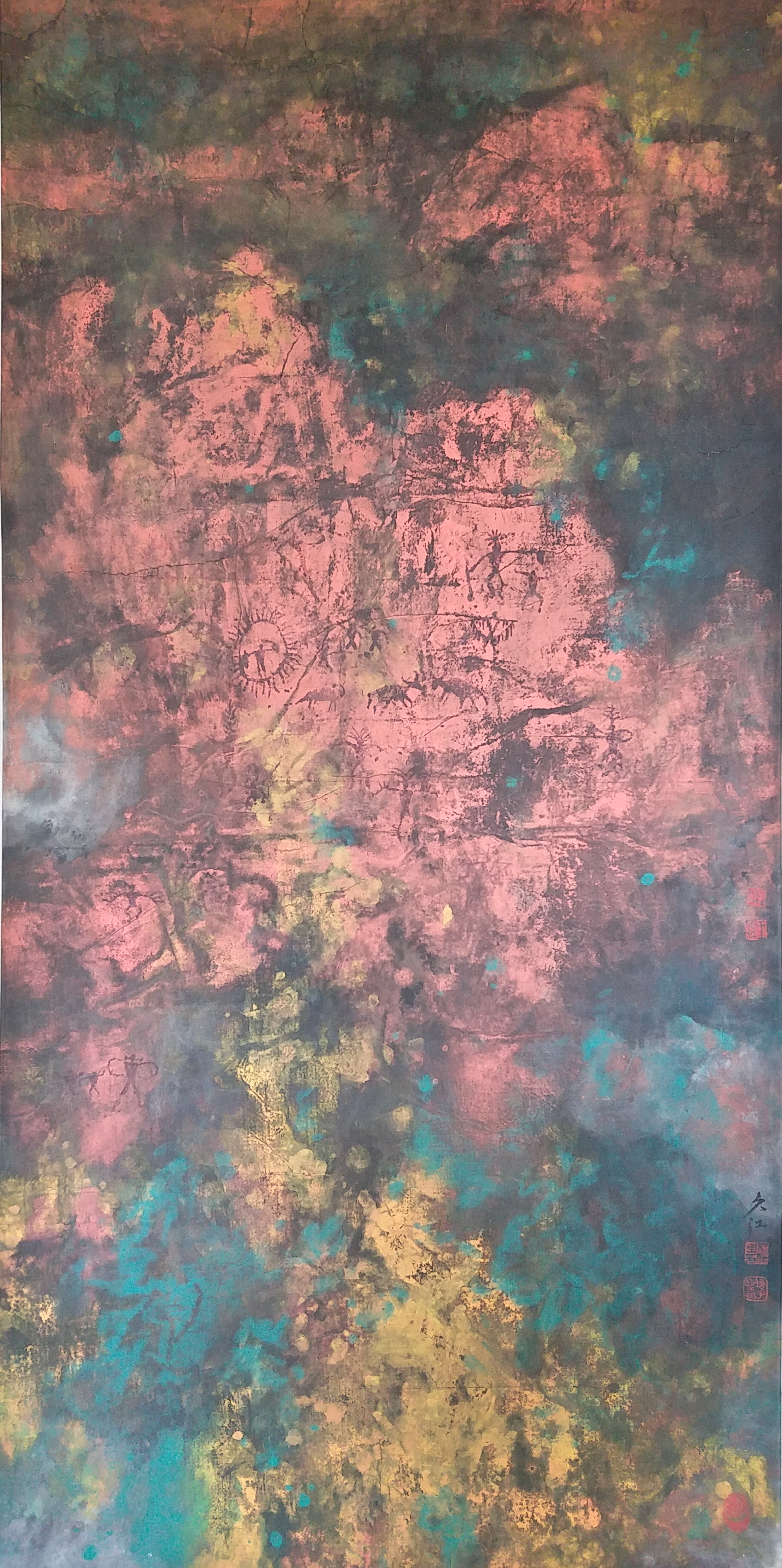
Ancient Totem

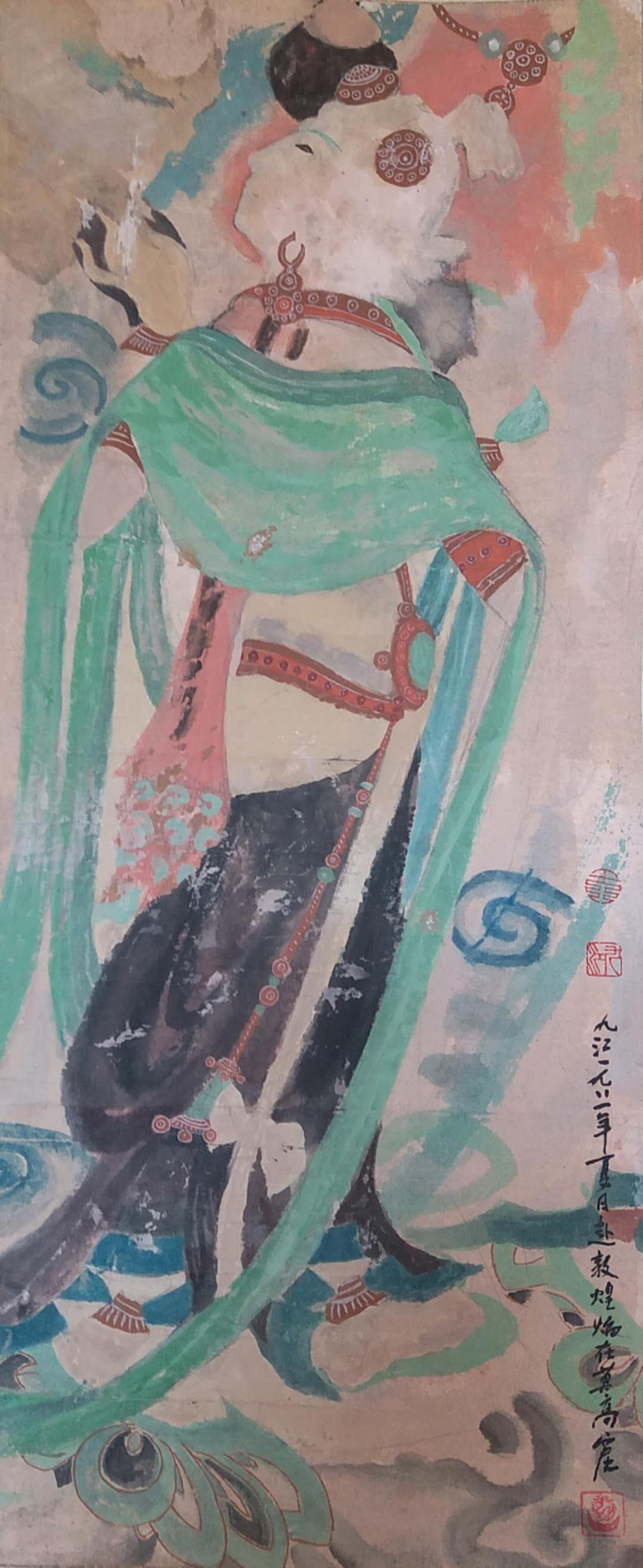
Replica of a fresco of a Buddhist figure of the Mogao Caves

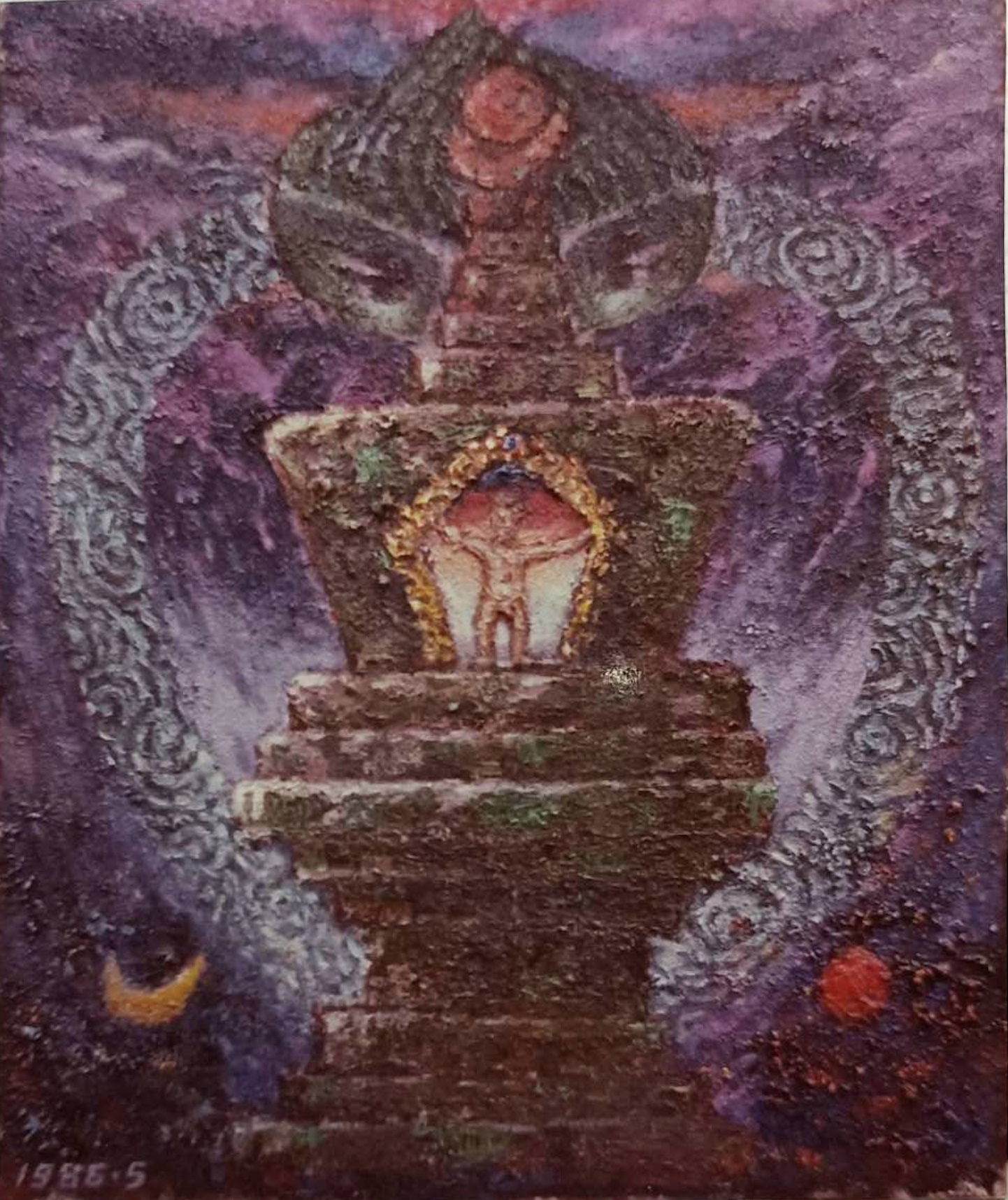
Birth of the Buddha, oil on paper, photograph

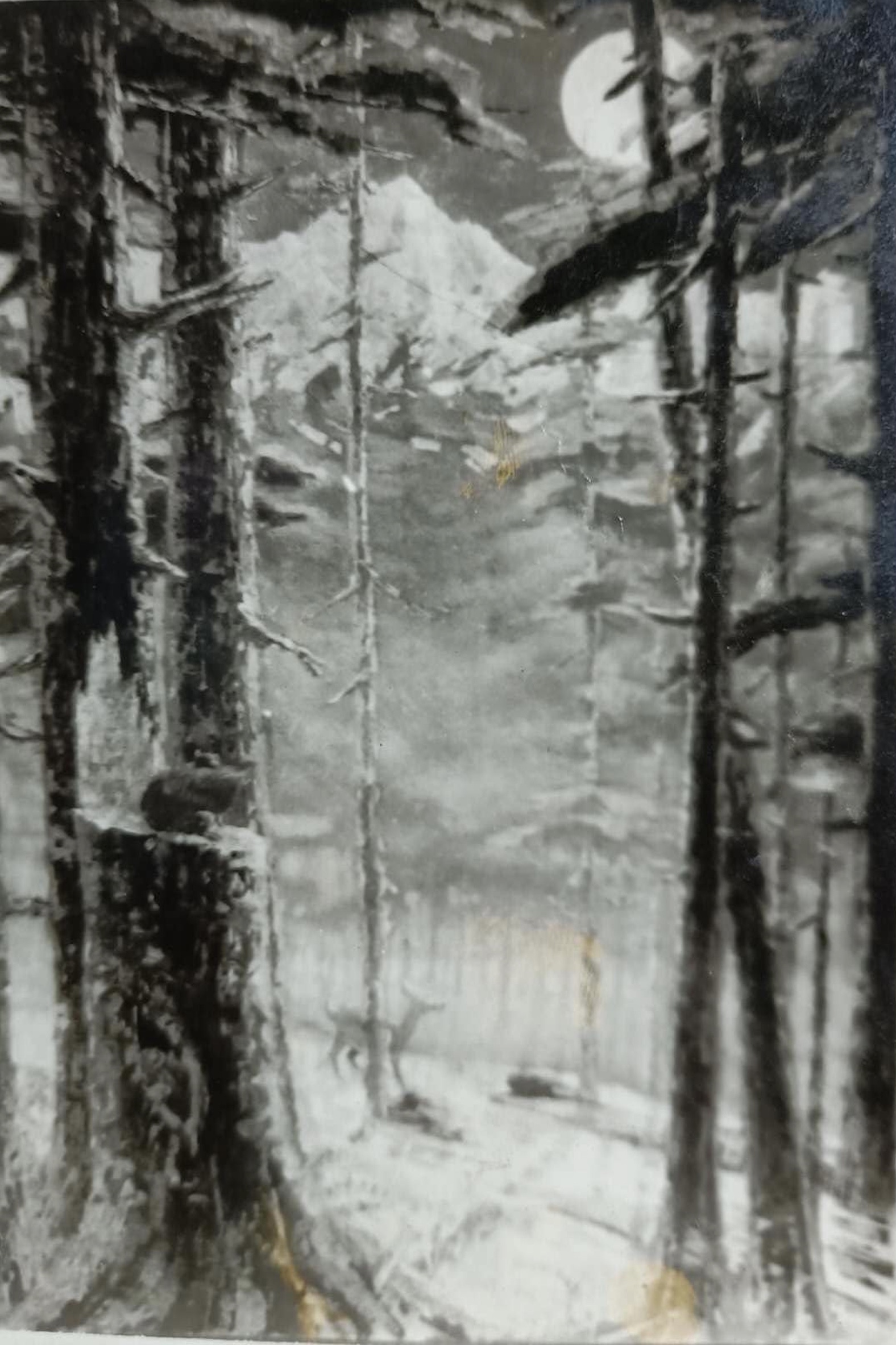
Moonlit Night, gouache, black-and-white photo
