= Tsering Döndrup =

Tibetan author

Tsering Döndrup (Tibetan: ཚེ་རིང་དོན་གྲུབ) is a Tibetan author from Malho. Döndrup was born in 1961 to a family of ethnically Mongolian nomadic herders. He is a historian and a major writer in contemporary Tibetan literature.

== Biography ==
Tsering Döndrup studied Tibetan language and literature at the Qinghai Nationalities Institute in Xining and the Northwest Nationalities Institute in Lanzhou. An early member of the Tibetan New Literature movement of the 1980s, Döndrup's work has continued to be relevant.

Several of his books have been translated into French, Chinese, and English. A collection of his short stories, The Handsome Monk And Other Stories, was translated into English and published by Columbia University Press in 2019. His novel about the 1958 Amdo uprising, The Red Wind Howls, was never formally published, although privately-printed copies have circulated on the black market. He lost his job and passport as a result of writing this book. An English translation of The Red Wind Howls by Christopher Peacock was published by Columbia University Press in June 2025.

== Books ==
- Ancestors (Mes po), 2001
- Fog (Smug pa), 2002
- The Red Wind Howls (རླུང་དམར་འུར་འུར། Rlung dmar 'ur 'ur), 2009
- My Two Fathers, 2015
- The Handsome Monk and Other Stories (English translation by Christopher Peacock), Columbia University Press, 2019
- The Red Wind Howls (English translation by Christopher Peacock), Columbia University Press, 2025.

== Short Stories ==
- ""Baba Baoma – Part One" By Tsering Döndrup". Translations and Commentary from Tibetan Social Media. 2020-11-18.
- "There's No". Yeshe. Translated by Choegyal Kyab. 2021.
- Döndrup, Tsering (2019-02-21). ""One Mani," a Story by Tsering Döndrup". Tricycle: The Buddhist Review. Translated by Christopher Peacock.
- Döndrup, Tsering (2021-02-24). "The Necktie". Waxing Moon: Journal of Tibetan and Himalayan Studies. Translated by Christopher Peacock.
