= Uncle =

Male relative who is sibling of one's parent

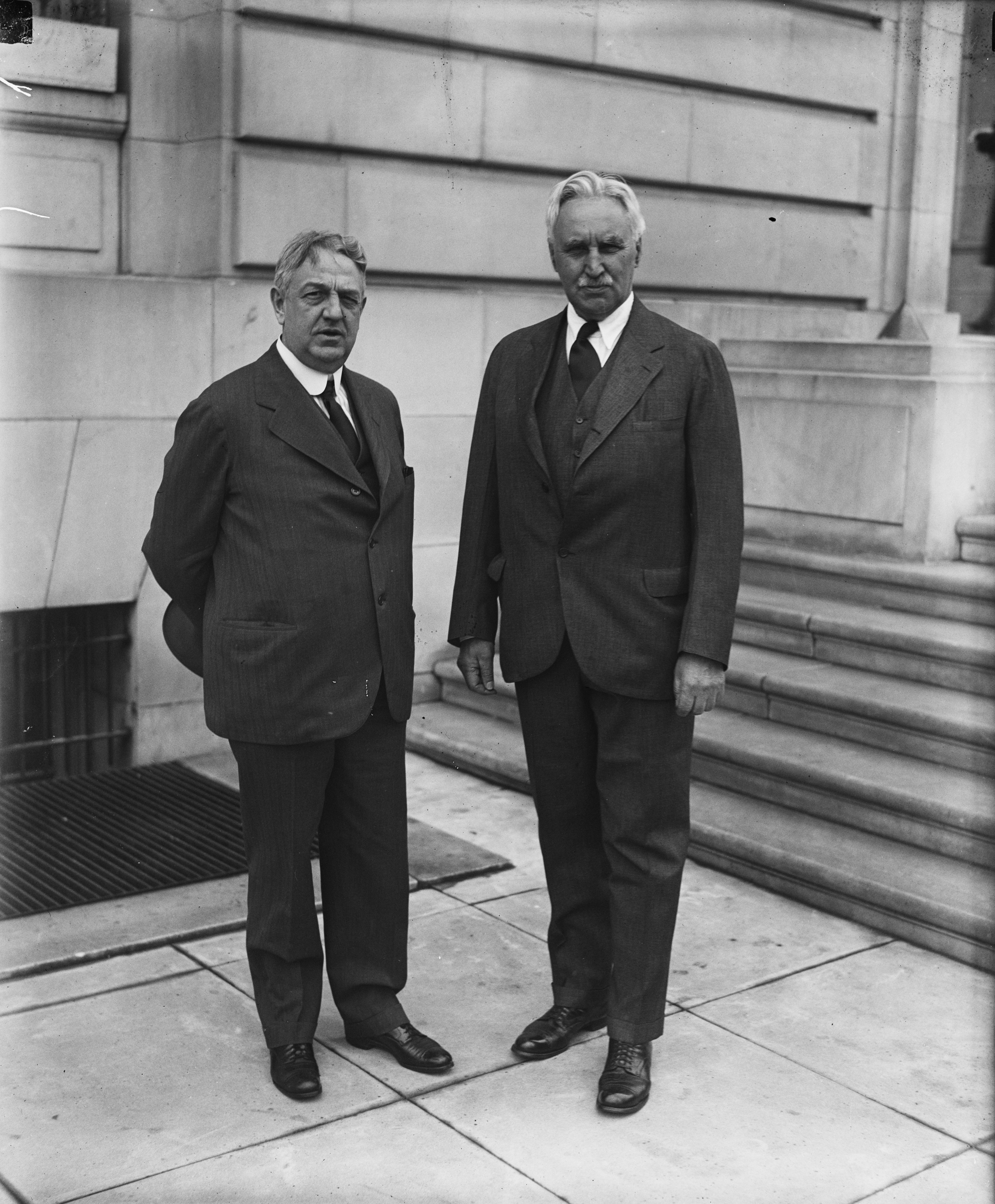
United States Representative Charles A. Eaton (right) and his nephew Rep. William R. Eaton (left)

An uncle is usually defined as a male relative who is a sibling of a parent; term for married to a sister of one of a parent, is uncle-in-law, as well as the parent of the cousins, although this individual is more commonly simply referred to as uncle without this distinction. Uncles who are related by birth are second-degree relatives. The female counterpart of an uncle is an aunt, and the reciprocal relationship is that of a nephew or niece. The word comes from Latin: avunculus, the diminutive of avus (grandfather), and is a family relationship within an extended or immediate family. A popular AAVE colloquial term derived from uncle used in Gen Z and Alpha English is unc, though it is often used to refer to someone who is out of touch or simply someone who is older.

In some cultures and families, children may refer to the cousins of their parents as uncle (or aunt). It is also used as a title of respect for older relatives, neighbours, acquaintances, family friends, and even total strangers in some cultures, for example Aboriginal Australian elders. Using the term in this way is a form of fictive kinship.

Any social institution where a special relationship exists between a man and his sisters' children is known as an avunculate (or avunculism or avuncularism). This relationship can be formal or informal, depending on the society. Early anthropological research focused on the association between the avunculate and matrilineal descent, while later research has expanded to consider the avunculate in general society.

== Additional terms ==
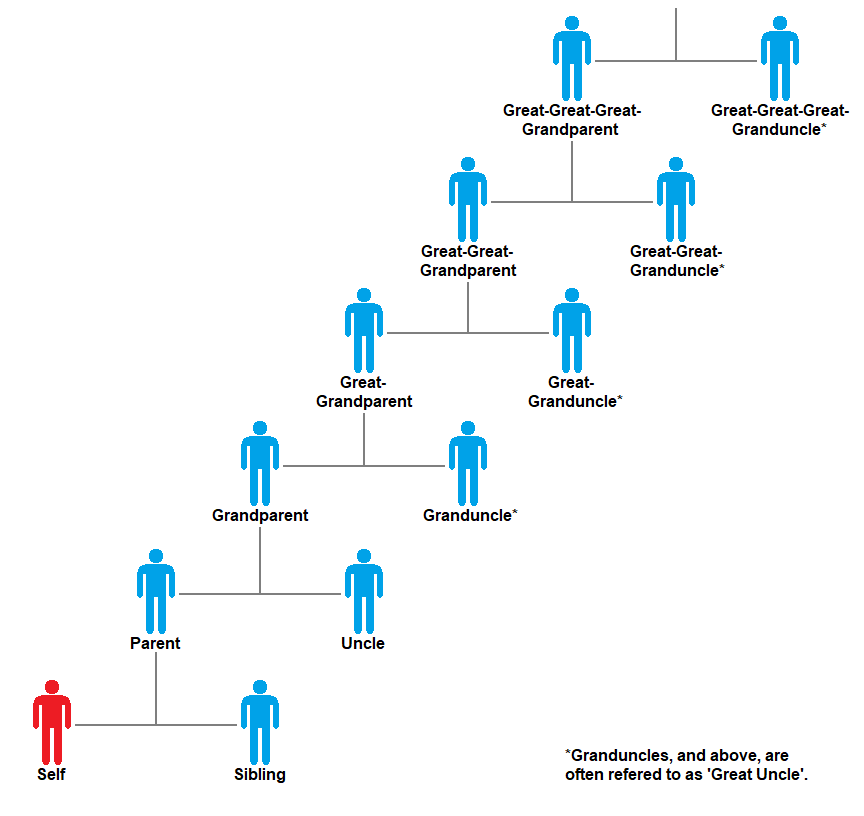
Uncles by generation

- A half-uncle is the half-brother of one's parent.
- A maternal uncle is the brother of one's mother.
- A paternal uncle is the brother of one's father.
- An uncle-in-law is the uncle of one's spouse or the husband of an individual's aunt or uncle.
- A parent's first cousin may be called a second uncle.
- A great-uncle/granduncle/grand-uncle is the brother of one's grandparent or an uncle of one's father or mother.
- A double half-uncle is the half-brother of one's both parents. He is the son of one's paternal grandfather and maternal grandmother or of one's paternal grandmother and maternal grandfather.

== Genetics and consanguinity ==
Uncles by birth (brother of a parent) are related to their nieces and nephews on average by 25% (1750 centimorgans) though this can vary considerably. As half-uncles are related through half brothers, they are related by average 12.5%. Non-consanguineous uncles (male spouse of a relative) are not related by blood.

== Cultural variations ==
=== Arabic ===
In Arabic, one's mother's brother is called Khal خال and the mother's sister is called Khalah خالة. On the father's side, one's father's brother is called Amm عم and the father's sister is called Ammah عمّة.

=== Turkish ===
In Turkish, one's mother's brother is called dayı, father's brother is amca, and aunt's husband is known as enişte. One's mother's sister is called teyze. Father's sister is hala. Uncle's wife is yenge.

=== Albanian, Slavic, and Persian ===
In some cultures, like Albanian, Slavic, or Persian, no single inclusive term describing both a person's kinship to their parental male sibling or parental male in-law exists. Instead, there are specific terms describing a person's kinship to their mother's brother (dajë in Albanian, daiyee in Persian, wuj (diminutive: wujek) in Polish) or a person's kinship to their father's brother (xhajë in Albanian, amou in Persian, stryj (diminutive: stryjek) in Polish). An analogous differentiation exists using separate terms to describe a person's kinship to their mother's female sibling (teze in Albanian, khaleh in Persian, ciotka (diminutive: ciocia) in Polish), and a person's kinship to their father's female sibling, (hallë in Albanian, ammeh in Persian, stryjna (diminutive: stryjenka) in Polish).

Furthermore, in Persian culture the terms used to describe a person's kinship to their maternal or paternal in-laws bear clear and unambiguous descriptions of that relationship, differentiating the parental in-laws from blood-relatives. For example, there is a specific term describing a person's kinship to the spouse of their paternal uncle (i.e. zan-amou, literally 'wife-of-' amou). This clarifies that kinship is to the spouse of the person's paternal male sibling, as opposed to a blood-relationship.

=== Indigenous Australians ===
Many Australian Aboriginal and Torres Strait Islander peoples address male respected senior members of the community, known as elders, as "uncle" (and women as "aunty") as a mark of seniority and respect, whether related or not, such as Uncle Archie (Roach) and Uncle Jack Charles.

=== South Asian ===
In India, unambiguous names are used for various uncles such as one's father's brother chacha (or kaka). If the brother of one's father is older than one's father then he is called Tauji (or taya or bapuji). One's mother's brother is called Mama. A paternal aunt's husband is called Fufa (or Fuva) and a maternal aunt's husband is called Mausa (or Masa) in Hindi (or Gujarati).

Likewise, in neighbouring Bangladesh (and Pakistan), mother's brother is also Mama (or Mamu) as well father's brother as Chacha. A paternal aunt's husband is Phupha and maternal aunt's husband is Khalu.

== Uncles in popular culture ==
Due to the loving image of an old but wise and friendly uncle in many cultures the word has been used as a loving nickname for many people. In Tibetan mythology Akhu Tönpa (Uncle Tompa) is a familiar and well-beloved figure. The American national personification Uncle Sam serves as an allegorical fatherly figure to many Americans. Various children's TV hosts have used uncle as their nickname, including Walt Disney (Uncle Walt), Bob Davidse (Nonkel Bob, literally Uncle Bob), Edwin Rutten (who hosted a children's show named De Show van Ome Willem [The Show of Uncle Willem]). The Dutch poet Ome Ko also used uncle as part of his pseudonym.

Rich, wise or otherwise eccentric uncles are also popular in works of fiction.

== See also ==
- Bob's your uncle
- Say Uncle
