= The Life of Orgyan Chokyi =

The Life of Orgyan Chokyi is the namtar of Orgyan Chokyi, a Tibetan Buddhist nun who lived in Dolpo, a region in northwestern Nepal, from 1675 until 1729. It is the oldest of only three extant pre-modern autobiographies by a Tibetan woman.

== Bibliography ==
- Schaeffer, Kurtis R. (2004). Himalayan Hermitess: The Life of a Tibetan Buddhist Nun. Oxford University Press. ISBN 0-19-515298-0.
