= Akhu Tönpa =

Trickster in Tibetan folklore

Akhu Tönpa (Tib: ཨ་ཁུ་སྟོན་པ་, Wyl: a khu ston pa), or Uncle Teacher, is a fictional character portrayed as a trickster in Tibetan folklore. Akhu Tönpa is portrayed as a layperson who frequently plays harmless and not-so-harmless pranks on villagers, monks, and members of the aristocracy. However, he also acts as a leader or role model. He is believed to be sent by Chenrezig (Avalokiteśvara), the Buddha of compassion, to teach Tibetans the art of being shrewd and witty. As such, he frequently outwits the strong and mighty in society and is portrayed as a champion of the common man.

== Etymology ==
"Akhu" means uncle in Tibetan, but it is also used as a title for older men by younger people, while ston pa means "to demonstrate, to show, teacher" and refers ultimately to the Buddha. However, he is known by different names in different parts of Tibet. In the Nedhong province of Tibet, he is known as Nyichoe Zangpo (Wyl: nyi chos bzang po), which translates to "good Dharma."

== History ==
Akhu Tönpa fables (Wyl.: sgrung stam) are a vast corpus of folklore in Tibetan culture. These fables convey traditional values while also simultaneously providing entertainment and are meant to be humorous. They often end with a moral message provided by Akhu Tönpa himself. In this way, Akhu Tönpa stories are interwoven with Tibetan Buddhist values and traditions. As folktales, they were originally passed down orally and have only recently been written down as interest grew in preserving Tibetan oral culture. As such, the provenance and age of many of these folktales is unknown, but it can be said with certainty that they are from the pre-1949 Chinese Annexation of Tibet by the People's Republic of China.

In one folktale, he leads the planting of a barren field by telling the villagers to dig for jewels that he lost.

According to "a survey of fifty-three Tibetan students from Yul shul, Mgo log, Rma Iho, Mtsho byang, Mtsho Iho, and Mtsho nub prefectures studying at Qinghai Education College in Xining...all the students had heard Aa khu bston pa (Akhu Tönpa) stories, thirty-three students had heard Afanti stories," while many other Tibetan tricksters were only known by a small number of the students, showing the ubiquity of Akhu Tönpa stories.

== See also ==
- Tibetan literature
