= Tibetan literature =

Tibetan literature generally refers to literature written in the Tibetan language or arising out of Tibetan culture. Historically, Tibetan has served as a trans-regional literary language that has been used, at different times, from Tibet to Mongolia, Russia, and present-day Bhutan, Nepal, India, and Pakistan. Today, the term Tibetan literature can also be applied to any work by an ethnic Tibetan person or arising out of Tibetan folk culture; contemporary Tibetan writers sometimes use Chinese, English, or other languages to compose their work.

== Terminology ==
Today, the term "Tibetan literature" can also be applied to any work by an ethnic Tibetan person. However, who is a "Tibetan" and who speaks "the Tibetan language" are contested. For instance, Chinese ethnologists have argued that the Baima language is independent from Tibetan, however, the state classifies them as Tibetans for fear of being seen as attacking the unity of Tibetan identity. Similarly, the Tibetan languages are in fact mutually unintelligible, which has created difficulty in education, where Chinese authorities impose for example Lhasa Tibetan on Amdo Tibetan speakers, because they are both considered part of the same language for political reasons.

== Historical ==
The Tibetan script was developed from an Indic script in the 7th century during the Tibetan Imperial period. Literature in the Tibetan language received its first impetus in the 8th century with the establishment of the monastic university Samye for the purpose of the translation of the voluminous Buddhist texts from Sanskrit into the vernacular. The Tibetan absorption of Buddhist thought allowed for the penetration of Chinese as well as Indian styles, through representations of the Arhat. In their final form, established in the 14th and 17th centuries respectively, these texts comprise the 108-volume Kangyur, and its 224-volume commentary, the Tengyur. Because of the destruction of the monastic universities of India by the Delhi Sultanate, the Tibetan versions of some works are the only extant ones. Around 950, a secret library was created in the Mogao Caves near the oasis of Dunhuang to protect Buddhist scriptures, and it is by this means that we possess many of the oldest versions of some Tibetan, Chinese and Uighur texts.

Throughout most of Tibetan history, its literary works have been strongly influenced by Buddhist thought: they are mostly religious, historical, and biographical texts, or a mixture of these genres. There are also collections of folktales (for example, those involving the trickster figure Akhu Tönpa), and works dealing with the ancient Bön religion, which preceded Tibetan Buddhism. Particularly well known in the West are the Tibetan Book of the Dead, translated into English in 1927, the 120-volume Epic of King Gesar, one of the few living epics, and The Tale of the Incomparable Prince by Tshe-rin-dban-rgyal (1697–1763), translated into English in 1996. The Gesar epic in particular is the key subject of study by the Chinese state, and was revived with the end of the clergy's monopoly on political power, since the Gelugpa monasteries forbade the epic literary genre.

== Modern era ==
After 1949, when China took power in Tibet, access to secular education was greatly expanded. As a result, Tibetan literature has now covered more diverse, non-monastic topics including social commentary. In 1980, the Tibet Autonomous Region Writers Association (TARWA) started the first Tibetan-language literature journal, Tibetan Literature and Art (Bod kyi rtsom rig sgyu rtsal), which published short stories about historical serfdom in Tibet. The most popular Tibetophone literary magazine in Qinghai, "Light Rain" (Drang Char), was founded in 1981, popularizing the short story genre in Tibet. After 1985, Tibetan journals also criticized the Gang of Four and the excesses of the Cultural Revolution, and were less bound by the constraints of political correctness. The influence of Chinese poetry, and of Western poetry in Chinese translation, began to make itself felt after the Four Modernizations. Despite these influences, critics and editors gave priority to stories and poems with traditional settings. Most new work takes the form of poetry.

The most influential Tibetan writers come from Qinghai rather than Tibet; these "Amdowa" writers include Dhondup Gyal and Gendün Chöphel, whose works were characteristic of modernism. Their works are featured in Tibetan-language textbooks used in the "Five Provinces" as part of China's unified education policy for all Tibetan-speaking areas of China. According to the exile historian Tsering Shakya, despite state monitoring, "Tibetan writers, intellectuals, and artists have been able through fiction to conduct an autonomous debate on the nature of Tibetan identity".

Modern Tibetan literature is influenced by the trends of Chinese literature as a whole because of intranational translation from Chinese into Tibetan; Tibetan-language literature is also translated into Chinese, but to a far lesser extent. The Catalogue of Chinese Publications in Tibetan Studies (1949-1991) lists 1,497 Tibetological publications, 813 in Chinese and 663 in Tibetan. Some well-known Tibetan writers who publish in both Chinese and Tibetan include Jangbu and Tsedor. Adding to the diversity of Tibetan literature are longtime Han Chinese residents of Tibet who were educated in Tibetan; these lao Xizang (Tibetan veterans) often publish literary criticism with nostalgic and sentimental overtones.

The literary scene since the 1990s generally organises itself in terms of small self-named groups of young writers, many of whom studied at Qinghai University in Xining. Among the first were the Four Demons of the Old Fort, followed by such groups as the Four Scholars, the Four Owl-Siblings of Rongwo, the Third Generation, etc. Within China the most promoted author is Alai (1959-), who writes in Chinese. Tashi Dawa, the vice-chairman of the TARWA, is another prominent Sinophone Tibetan writer.

== Diaspora literature ==
Writers in the Tibetan diaspora also produce literature. The first literary journal of such writers was Jangzhon (1990–97), which was succeeded by several different independent periodicals; and the First National Conference of Tibetan Writers, organised by the Amnye Machen Institute, was held from 15–17 March 1995 at Dharamsala, India. Books in English have been written by exiles such as Bhuchung T. Sonam, Tsering Wangmo Dhompa, Jamyang Norbu and Tenzin Tsundue. Especially popular are autobiographies of Tibetans for an American and British audience. However, pressures from the popular expectations of Western readers for what Vincanne Adams calls the "authentic Tibetan" limit success to authors who identify themselves "as Buddhist, as nationalist, and as exiles". Tibetans who actually live in Tibet, or whose experience incorporates aspects of Chinese or Western culture, are seen to be "tainted".

== Some modern writers ==
- Dungkar Lozang Trinlé (1927–97)
- Tseten Zhapdrüng (1910–85)
- Mugé Samten (1923/4–93)
- Dorjé Gyelpo (1913–92)
- Khyenrap Ösel (1925–)
- Druprik Khyumchok (1930–)
- Tupten Nyima (1943–)
- Alak Dorzhi (1935/6–)
- Lugyel Bum
- Jamyang Drakpa
- Döndrup Gyel (1953–85)
- Nordé
- Penjor Langdün
- Repgong Dorjekhar
- Sebo (1956–)
- Chapgak Dorjé Tsering
- Tenzin Gyatso, the 14th Dalai Lama
- Chöpa Döndrup
- Dorjé Tsering (Jangbu)
- Rinchen Trashi
- Tsering Döndrup
- Tashi Dawa (1959–, Sinophone)
- Patsé
- Lhagyel Tsering
- Namsé
- Gönpo Trashi
- Orgyen Dorjé
- Trashi Döndrup
- Pema Tseten
- Tenpa Yargyé
- Yangzin (1963–)
- Langdün Päljor

== See also ==
- Tibetan culture
- Tibetan Buddhist canon
- Namtar—hagiography
- Tibetan autobiography
- List of Tibetan writers
- The Girl Langa Langchung and the Rooster
- Tibetan and Himalayan Library
- Category:Tibetan Buddhist texts

== Bibliography ==
- Among Tibetan Texts: History and Literature of the Himalayan Plateau. E. Gene Smith. Wisdom Publications, 2001.
- Tibetan Literature: Studies in Genre. Jose Ignacio Cabezon, Roger R. Jackson. Snow Lion Publications, 1995.
- Contemporary Tibetan Literary Studies. (v1-6) ed. Steven J. Venturino, International Association for Tibetan Studies, Oxford.
- Materials for a history of Tibetan literature, Part 1. Lokesh Chandra, International Academy of Indian Culture, 1963
- Modern Tibetan Literature and Social Change. Lauran R. Hartley, Matthew T. (FRW) Kapstein, Patricia Schiaffini-Vedani. Duke University Press, 2008.
- Tibetan literature. Wei Wu (肖丽萍), Yufang Geng (耿予方).
- The arrow and the spindle: studies in history, myths, rituals and beliefs in Tibet, Volume 2. Samten Gyaltsen Karmay, Mandala Book Point, 1998
- Amdo Tibetans in transition: society and culture in the post-Mao era. International Association for Tibetan Studies, Leiden 2000
