= Françoise Robin =

External videos
- “Françoise Robin on Tibetan Poetry and Film”, Keynote address, 2014 Himalayan Studies Conference at Yale University, April 16, 2014.

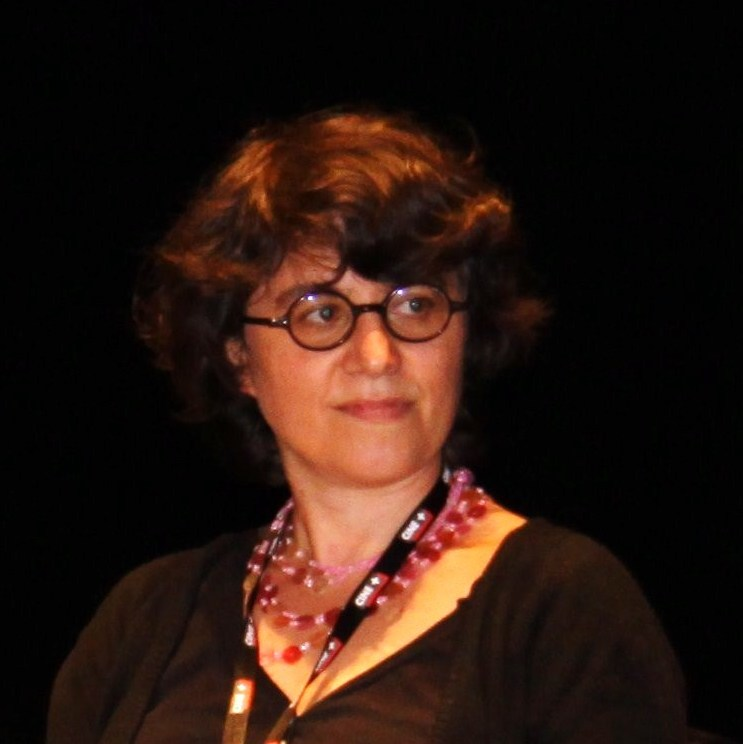
Françoise Robin (2012)

Françoise Robin (born 1968) is a Tibetan-studies professor at Paris' National Institute of Oriental Languages and Civilizations (INALCO), where she specialises in the language, cinema, and literature of Tibet. Robin is currently the general secretary of the International Association for Tibetan Studies.

== Career ==
Robin has made more than twenty trips to the Himalayan region and Tibet, including three months in Nepal in 1993 and a ten-month residence in Tibet in 1994. In 1999 she obtained her DEA from INALCO. Her doctoral thesis, submitted in 2003, was supervised by Heather Stoddard and was entitled: La littérature de fiction d'expression tibétaine au Tibet depuis 1950 : enjeux identitaires ("Fiction Literature of Tibetan Expression in Tibet after 1950: Identity Issues")

Subsequently, Robin became a professor at INALCO. From 2009 to 2015, she was director of the Institute of Tibetan Studies of the Collège de France. She has directed the Tibetan division of INALCO since 2011 and was director of their Department of Southeast Asia, Upper Asia, and the Pacific from 2013 to 2014.

Robin became a member of the Société Asiatique in 2002 and was a member of the Association for Asian Studies from 2007 to 2010 and then again from 2017. She was co-founder of SFEMT (The French Society for Study of the Tibetan World) in 2012 and served as the organisation's president until 2016, when she became vice-president. She became an elected member of the administrative council of the International Association for Tibetan Studies in 2016 and has been General Secretary of the association since 2019. She is an associate member of the Research Centre for East Asian Civilizations (CRCAO) at the French National Centre for Scientific Research.

She is a member of the editorial board of the journal Himalaya: The Journal of the Association for Nepal and Himalayan Studies.

In December 2012, she was one of 80 "very significant specialists on Tibet" who called on General Secretary of the Chinese Communist Party Xi Jinping to intervene to save the Tibetan language from extinction. In 2016, she told The Guardian that the allegations of poor treatment of the film-maker Pema Tseden were reflective of the way Tibetans are treated by the Chinese authorities and indicated that China was not a state of law.

== Academic publications ==
- 2008 « 'Oracles and Demons' in Tibetan Literature Today: Representations of Religion in Tibetan-Medium Fiction, » in Modern Tibetan Literature and Social Change, L. Hartley et P. Schiaffini (eds.), Durham, Duke University Press, 2008, 148–170.
- Compte-rendu de Authenticating Tibet de Mmes Blondeau & Buffetrille (2008), Perspectives Chinoises 2008(1) : 102–107.
- 2007 « Réduplication dans les langues tibéto-birmanes : l'exemple du birman et du tibétain », jointly with A. Vittrant, first author (Lacito-CNRS, Université Aix), Faits de langue 2007 (29) : 77–98.
- 2006 « Les Jeux de la sapience et de la censure. Genèse des Contes facétieux du cadavre au Tibet », in Journal Asiatique, numéro spécial Proverbes, contes et littérature sapientiale en Orient, 2006, tome 294(1) : 181–196. doi:10.2143/JA.294.1.2017897
- « Stories and History : The Emergence of Historical Fiction in Contemporary Tibet », in S. Venturino (éd.), Proceedings of the 10th Seminar of the IATS, 2003. Contemporary Tibetan Literary Studies. Leiden, 2006 : Brill, pp. 23–41.
- 2005 « Note préliminaire concernant les imprimeries non monastiques au Tibet traditionnel », in La Conception et la circulation des textes tibétains. Cahiers d'Extrême Asie 2005 (15) : 1-26.
- « L'avènement du vers libre au Tibet : une forme littéraire de l'intime au service d'un projet collectif », in Bacqué-Grammond, Jean-Louis, Angel Pino et Samaha Khoury (éds.), D'un Orient l'autre. Actes des troisièmes journées de l'Orient. Paris, Louvain : Peeters, Cahiers de la Société Asiatique, nouvelle série, IV, 2005 : 573–601.
- « Tagore au Tibet », in Revue d'Études Tibétaines, n°7 (Avril 2005), pp. 22–40 (téléchargeable sur http://www.thdl.org/texts/reprints/ret/ret_7.pdf).
- « Gesar », in Jones, Lindsay (ed.), Encyclopedia of Religions, Second Edition, vol. 5. Detroit, 2005 : MacMillan Reference, 3463–3465.
- 2003 « 'Khor ba'i Snying bo, The Essence of Samsara ». New York, 2004 : Latse Magazine, pp. 16–25.
- 2002 « The Unreal World of Tibetan Free Verse Poetry : A Preliminary Study on Topics and Themes in Contemporary Tibetan Free Verse Poetry », in Blezer, Henk (ed.), Religion and Secular Culture in Tibet, Tibetan Studies vol. II. Proceedings of the Ninth Seminar of the IATS, 2000. Leiden, 2002 : Brill, pp. 451–470.
- 1999 ed. of section « Tibet » (100 pages) of Action Poétique 1999 (157): « Tibet Aujourd'hui » with translation of a dozen poems.
- « Death in Contemporary Tibetan Poetry », Lungta Magazine, special number « Contemporary Tibetan Literature », Summer 1999. Dharamsala (Inde) : Amnye Machen Institute, pp. 49–56.

=== Translations ===
- 2007 Publication and translation of L'Artiste tibétain, by Thöndrupgyäl. Paris : Bleu de Chine, juin 2007.
- 2006 Le Grand livre des proverbes tibétains, recueil thématique de proverbes bilingues tibétain-français, précédés d'une introduction et suivis d'un index, jointly with N. Tournadre. Paris : Presses du Châtelet, 2006.
- * corrected pocket version with the title Maxi proverbes tibétains (Marabout).
- Publication and translation of La Fleur vaincue par le gel, by Thöndrupgyäl. Paris, Bleu de Chine, 2006.
- Publication and translation of La Controverse dans le jardin aux fleurs, by Langdün Päljor. Paris, Bleu de Chine, 2006.
- Contes facétieux du cadavre. Recueil de contes tibétains traditionnels, version bilingue tibétain-français précédée d'une introduction et accompagné d'un appareil de notes et d'un lexique. Paris : Éditions Langues et Mondes – L'Asiathèque, collection « Bilingues L&M », 2006.
