= Namtar (biography) =

Spiritual Hagiography

A namtar (Tibetan: རྣམ་ཐར་, Wylie: rNam-thar), sometimes spelled namthar, is a spiritual biography or hagiography in Tibetan Buddhism.

Namtar is a contraction of nampar tharpa (Tibetan: རྣམ་པར་ཐར་པ་, Wylie: rnam-par thar-pa), which literally means 'complete liberation'. This name refers to the fact that the texts tell stories of yogis or Indo-Tibetan Mahasiddha who attained complete enlightenment. Such texts serve as examples of buddhahood for practitioners of Vajrayana and complement the tantras in imparting instructions on specific tantric spiritual practices. According to Janice D. Willis, the focus on spiritual practice forms an essential difference between Christian and Tibetan hagiography.

In her book Women of Wisdom, Tsultrim Allione voices it thus:

The sacred biography is called Namthar in Tibetan, which literally means 'complete liberation.' The Namthar are specially geared to provide records for those on a spiritual quest, in much the same way that someone about to climb a high mountain would seek out the chronicles of those who had made the climb before. The sacred biographer is primarily concerned with providing information which will be helpful and inspirational for someone following in the footsteps of the spiritual adept or 'saint.' Establishing a mythical ideal and the communication of the sacred teachings takes precedence over providing a narrative portrait or "likeness" of the subject as a personality. The personality is stressed only in so far as it relates to the spiritual process of the individual.

Western academic tradition often portrays this type of text in an unfavourable light. It mainly criticizes the Tibetan hagiography for its inclusion of miraculous events and repetition of the protagonist's sanctity. Some scholars have therefore proposed that the Namtar has no historical value whatsoever.

== Traditional division ==
All Tibetan Namtar consist of three parts:

- The outer biography (Tibetan: ཕྱིའི་རྣམ་ཐར་, Wylie: phyi'i rnam-thar), containing descriptions of birth, education and consulted texts.
- The inner biography (Tibetan: ནང་གི་རྣམ་ཐར་, Wylie: nang-gi rnam-thar), containing details on meditative cycles and initiations.
- The secret biography (Tibetan: གསང་བའི་རྣམ་ཐར་, Wylie: gsang-ba'i rnam-thar), said to describe the meditative state of the siddha.

Mainly the third of these levels has caused western scholars to criticize this form of literature. Willis however defends their historical value by arguing that the miraculous parts of the secret biography may be interpreted as a metaphor for tantric practice.

== See also ==
- The Life of Orgyan Chokyi

== Bibliography ==
- Allione, Tsultrim (1986). Women of Wisdom. London: Arkana. ISBN 1-85063-044-5.
- Dowman, K. (1973) The Legends of the Great Stupa and the Life Story of the Lotus Born Guru (Berkeley).
- Snellgrove, D. (1957) Buddhist Himalaya (Oxford).
- Tucci, G. (1949) Tibetan Painted Scrolls (Rome).
- Willis, J.D. (1985) 'On the Nature of rNam-thar: Early dGe-lugs-pa Siddha Biographies' in: Aziz, B.A. & Kapstein, M. (eds.) Soundings in Tibetan Civilization (Kathmandu): 304–319.
