= László L. Lőrincz =

Hungarian academic and writer (1939)

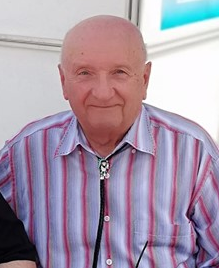
László L. Lőrincz

László L. Lőrincz (Leslie L. Lawrence) (born 15 June 1939, Szilvásszentmárton) is a Hungarian orientalist, science fiction author, and translator. His 1982 collection A nagy kupola szégyene (The Shame of the Great Dome) deals with crime, punishment, and social isolation. Several of his novels are noted for their plots and ideas.

His fiction works can be divided into two main categories: traditional science fiction novels and adventure stories, mostly published under the name Leslie L. Lawrence. His works are noted for featuring oriental mythology (in a fairly exact manner, due to him being an orientalist).

== Partial bibliography ==
=== Novels published under the name László L. Lőrincz ===
- Dzsingisz kán (1972)
- A sólyom kinyújtja karmait (1973)
- Az éjszaka doktora (1975)
- A nagy fa árnyékában (1979)
- Az utolsó hvárezmi nyár (1980)
- Utazz velünk tevekaravánnal (1981)
- A nagy kupola szégyene (1982)
- A furcsa pár (1982)
- A józan értelem széruma (1982)
- A nagy kupola szégyene (1982)
- Az aranygyapjú (1982)
- Használhatatlanok (1982)
- Nyaralj velünk az Altaj hegységben (1982)
- Rekviem a kacsalábért (1982)
- Vásárfia – Pánik piócáéknál (1983)
- A hosszú szafári (1984)
- A föld alatti piramis I.-II. (1986)
- Lhászáig hosszú az út (1986)
- Üvöltő bika (1988)
- A halott város árnyai (1989)
- Az elátkozott hajó (1989)
- Gyilkos járt a kastélyomban (1989)
- A gyilkos mindig visszatér (1990)
- Kegyetlen csillagok (1992)
- A nagy mészárlás (1993)
- A kő fiai (1994)
- Kéz a sziklán (1997)
- A kicsik (regény, 2000)
- A kicsik nyomában (2002)
- A tizenhárom kristálykoponya (2004)
- Manituk(Vigyázz, ha fúj a szél!)(2008)
- Kilenc csontfarkas (2009)

=== Novels published under the name Leslie L. Lawrence ===
- Sindzse szeme (1983)
- A karvaly árnyékában (1985)
- Holdanyó fényes arca (A Hari Krisna gyilkosságok) (1987)
- Huan-Ti átka (1987)
- A fojtogatók hajója (1987)
- A gyűlölet fája (1988)
- Siva utolsó tánca (1988)
- A vérfarkas éjszakája (1988)
- A Suttogó árnyak öble (1988)
- A halál kisvasúton érkezik (1988)
- A gonosz és a fekete hercegnő (1989)
- A megfojtott Viking mocsara (1989)
- A láp lidérce (1989)
- Nebet Het, a halottak úrnője (1989)
- A keselyűk gyászzenéje (1990)
- Az ördög fekete kalapja (1990)
- Gyilkosság az olimpián (1990)
- Omosi mama sípja (A Matteo Ricci gyilkosságok) (1991)
- Miranda koporsója (regény, 1991)
- Naraszinha oszlopa (regény, 1991)
- A vérfarkas visszatér (1992)
- Halálkiáltók (1993)
- Damballa botja (A vudu gyilkosságok) (1994)
- Sziget a ködben (1995)
- A rodzsungok kolostora (regény, 1995)
- Monszun (regény, 1996)
- A nagy madár (regény, 1996)
- Lebegők (regény, 1997)
- A láthatatlan kolostor (regény, 1998)
- Ahol a pajpaj jár (regény, 1998)
- Mau-Mau (A McIntire-gyilkosságok) (regény, 1999)
- Tulpa (A Gonosz halotti leple) (regény, 1999)
- Ganésa gyémántjai (2000)
- Véresszakállú Leif és a lávamező (2001)
- A Vadász (2001)
- Csöd (2002)
- Siva újra táncol (2003)
- A vérfarkasok kastélyában (2003)
- A fekete anya kigyója ( 2004)
- A felakasztott indián szigetén ( 2005)
- A maharáni arcképe (2005)
- Szádhuk – A hosszú álom (2005)
- Három sötét király (regény, 2006)
- A vízidisznók gyöngyökről álmodnak (2006)
- Portugál április ( 2007)
- Thumo (2007)
- Manituk (2008)
- A lófejű démon (2008)
- A fekete özvegy (2009)

=== Novels published under the name Frank Cockney ===
- Négy fekete koporsó (1989)
- Rókacsapda (1990)

== Sources ==
- The Encyclopedia of Science Fiction, page 604
