= Lhasang Tsering =

Tibetan poet, writer and activist (1952–2026)

- ལྷ་བཟང་ཚེ་རིང
- Born: 1952; Labrang Kosa, Tradun region, Tibet, China
- Died: 11 June 2026 (aged 74); Dharamsala, Himachal Pradesh, India
- Education: Wynberg Allen School
- Known for: Activism, writing and poetry
- Notable work: Tomorrow and Other Poems Ocean of Melody Hold On and other Verses
- Children: 2
- Relatives: Karma Chophel

Lhasang Tsering (Tibetan: ལྷ་བཟང་ཚེ་རིང, Wylie: lha bzang tshe ring; 1952 – 11 June 2026) was a Tibetan poet, writer and activist. He was president of the Tibetan Youth Congress and a founding director of Amnye Machen Institute in Dharamsala, India.

== Early life ==
Lhasang Tsering was born in 1952 in Labrang Kosa in the Tradün region of Ngari, Western Tibet. His father, a tantric lama from Riwoche Monastery in East Tibet met the future mother of Lhasang Tsering, Jhanjup, a young maid from the Tara aristocrat family in Gyantse. They had three sons: Ugyen, Karma Choephel, and Lhasang Tsering. After the 1959 Tibetan uprising, his parents escaped to India along with his two older brothers. His father passed away on pilgrimage at Rewalsar, a lake in Himachal Pradesh linked with Padmasambhava. The other members of the family joined other Tibetan refugees on road labour camp in Manali.

In 1962, he was admitted to study at the Central School for Tibetans in Mussoorie, India. Thereafter, he was selected from the pool of students to study at the Wynberg Allen School in the same city. Later, in 1972, he received an opportunity to attend Johns Hopkins School of Medicine in the United States, instead, he declined the opportunity and decided to join the Tibetan resistance force based in Mustang, Nepal.

== Career ==
After completing his school in 1972 he joined the Tibetan resistance forces based in Mustang, Western Nepal. However, the Mustang base camp was closed in 1974 and he had to return to Dharamsala after two years, where he worked briefly at the Tibetan office of Research and Analysis (TORA) headed by Lodi Gyari. Lhasang Tsering was in charge of the Russian desk. When TORA was closed by the Tibet Government in Exile, Tsering joined the Tibetan Children's Village (TCV) in Dharamsala and expanded the elementary school into high school under the guidance of its director Jetsun Pema. He served TCV as its Principal from 1976 to 1982. During his time at the TCV, he was one of the people instrumental in establishing TCV schools in Ladakh and in Bylakuppe, Karnataka. He also helped develop the TCV school in Lower Dharamsala.

For one year in 1978–79, Lhasang Tsering lived in Japan, and during three months in 1980 he could travel inside Tibet. In March 1983, on instructions from the Dalai Lama, he joined the Information Office of the Tibetan exile government. While working at the Information Office, he helped develop the Narthang publications project, planned the computerization of the Tibetan language, and a new font for printing Tibetan. In 1986 he was elected as the president of the Tibetan Youth Congress, Dharamsala. When protests for independence arose in Lhasa in December 1988, and in March 1989, he organized hunger strikes in New Delhi and elsewhere in India. In 1989, he was re-elected as president. However, due to his opposition to the Middle-Way Approach he resigned in 1990.

He edited the Tibetan Review as an acting editor between May and December 1986, when its editor Tsering Wangyal went to United States for an internship offered by the Alfred Friendly Press Fellowship.

== Amnye Machen Institute ==
In 1992, Tashi Tsering, Pema Bhum, Jamyang Norbu and Lhasang Tsering founded the Amnye Machen Institute (AMI, Tibetan Centre for Advanced Studies). The institute aimed at promoting an international and secular culture within traditional Tibetan society. Tsering worked as its director as a full-time volunteer at the institute, helping with translation, editing, general administration, and fund-raising. Lhasang Tsering managed to invite the philanthropist George Soros to MacLeod Ganj to meet the directors of AMI. In 1999, he resigned from the institute after running it single-handedly for six years.

== Bookstore ==
Tsering opened Bookworm, the first bookstore in McLeod Ganj, Himachal Pradesh, India, seeking to promote and enhance the reading culture in the Tibetan exile capital.

== Writing ==
After retiring from the Amnye Machen Institute in 1999, he devoted more time in writing, researching, and talking to students and journalists about Tibet. Tsering published a few books. His first book was Tomorrow and Other Poems, published in 2003. His second book Ocean of Melody, published in 2009, was a translation of the Songs of the Sixth Dalai Lama. In 2012, he published his third book Hold On and other Verses. He also published Three Nevers (2012), Wondering (2012), and Random: Ideas & Opinions of a Rebel (2014). He is the author of essays and articles about Tibetan history, culture, and politics. One of his books, No, Your Holiness, No!, had not yet been published at the time of his death in 2026. He also wrote articles, some of which are published on his page at TibetWrites.

== Death ==
Tsering died on 11 June 2026, at Jampa Ling Old Age Home in Dharamsala at the age of 74.

== Books ==
- Tomorrow and Other Poems
- Ocean of Melody
- Hold On and other Verses.
