= Angry Monk: Reflections on Tibet =

2005 Swiss documentary film

- Directed by: Luc Schaedler
- Written by: Luc Schaedler
- Produced by: Luc Schaedler
- Starring: Golok Jigme; Thubten Wangpo; Tsering Shakya; Tashi Tsering; Alak Yongtsin
- Cinematography: Filip Zumbrunn
- Edited by: Martin Witz; Kathrin Plüss
- Music by: Roland Widmer; Heinz Rohrer; Loten Namling
- Production companies: Angry Monk Productions; Suissimage; SF DRS
- Distributed by: Xenix Filmdistribution (Switzerland); Icarus Films (United States)
- Release date: September 1, 2005 (Switzerland)
- Running time: 97 minutes
- Country: Switzerland
- Languages: English, Tibetan

Angry Monk: Reflections on Tibet is a 2005 Swiss documentary film directed by Luc Schaedler. It traces the life of the Tibetan monk, scholar and writer Gendün Chöphel (1903–1951), whose critical writings challenged the religious and political establishment of his time, and uses his biography as a way into the history of 20th-century Tibet and its present. The film was produced as part of a doctoral dissertation in visual anthropology at the University of Zurich and screened in the World Cinema Documentary Competition of the 2006 Sundance Film Festival.

== Synopsis ==
The film follows the stations of Gendün Chöphel's life, from his native Amdo in north-eastern Tibet to the monasteries of Central Tibet, his years of travel in India from 1934, and his return to Lhasa in 1946, where he was imprisoned. He died in 1951, shortly after the Chinese takeover of Tibet. Interviews with historians, writers and people who knew Chöphel – among them Tsering Shakya, Tashi Tsering and Golok Jigme – are combined with archival material and footage filmed along the routes of his journeys.

The film questions the Western image of Tibet as a timeless spiritual refuge. According to Variety, it challenges "the notion of Tibet as an oasis of tranquil spirituality victimized solely by Chinese oppression".

== Background and production ==
Schaedler, who studied visual anthropology at the University of Zurich, had previously made the documentary Made in Hong Kong (1997) as his master's thesis. Angry Monk was his doctoral project, supervised by the anthropologist Michael Oppitz; according to the university's journal it was the first doctoral dissertation at the University of Zurich to take the form of a film. The written part of the dissertation documents the sources behind the film, including transcripts of 29 interviews, translations of texts by Gendün Chöphel, a chronology and the script, and treats the film as a constructed and subjective text. With the later documentaries Watermarks – Three Letters from China (2013) and A Long Way Home (2018), it forms part of a series of four films by Schaedler set in the Chinese cultural sphere.

The scenes in Tibet were shot without permission from the Chinese authorities by a two-person crew, Schaedler and cinematographer Filip Zumbrunn, who posed as tourists. The film was shot on mini-DV and transferred to 35 mm film. Schaedler told Le Temps that Chöphel served him as "a kind of guide, a key to understanding the real Tibet".

== Release ==
Angry Monk was released in German-speaking Switzerland on 1 September 2005 and in French-speaking Switzerland on 5 April 2006. In 2005 it was shown at the Vancouver International Film Festival and the Busan International Film Festival. In January 2006 it had its North American premiere in competition at the Sundance Film Festival, where it was programmed alongside Christian Frei's The Giant Buddhas. It was also screened at the Munich International Documentary Festival in 2006. The film was released in Germany on 12 October 2006; in the United States it is distributed by First Run/Icarus Films.

== Reception ==
=== Critical response ===
Dennis Harvey of Variety wrote that the interviews, archival material and "handsome latter-day footage retracing Choephel's journeys mix smoothly in polished package". In Himal Southasian, Felix Holmgren described the film as "scrupulously free of nostalgia and awestruck overtones". Writing in the Swiss film magazine Filmbulletin, Johannes Binotto noted that the film shows a Tibet that is not merely a victim but seeks to change its own fate, which makes it both uncomfortable for Western viewers and important. In Le Temps, Norbert Creutz praised its freedom from television formatting but found the sequences on Chöphel's years in India visually weak; he concluded that it was one of those "precious films that help one understand the course of the world better".

=== Academic reception ===
The film was reviewed in several anthropological and Asian studies journals. In American Anthropologist, historian Michael G. Chang wrote that "what distinguishes Angry Monk is its visual power and elegance", credited it with a "fine ethnographic sensibility", and noted that it presents Tibetans "as critics of their own culture and active agents of history". In History and Anthropology, Anna Grimshaw called it "an ambitious and accomplished work" with "consistently high production values", but considered it "conventionally—and heavily—narrated" and "out of step" with contemporary ethnographic filmmaking; she nevertheless saw in it "a valuable model for those committed to the intellectual seriousness of non-textual forms".

Reviewing the film for teaching purposes in Education About Asia, Andrew Quintman described it as a "rich and timely film" and an "illuminating, if incomplete, portrait", though he felt that Chöphel himself "remains something of a phantom". Charlene E. Makley, in Visual Anthropology, called it a "provocative and masterfully edited video montage", but criticised a modernist and secular perspective that in her view underplays Chöphel's Buddhist commitments and the geopolitical context. In the newsletter of the International Institute for Asian Studies, Mara Matta regarded the film as a fairly balanced portrait of a controversial figure that presents Tibet as a real country with a complex history rather than a mythical Shangri-La, and recommended it for university teaching.
