= 1996 Tibetan Parliament in Exile election =

Elections for the 43 seats in the Tibetan Parliament in Exile were held on 25 April 1996. Organized by the Tibetan Electoral Commission, participation was reported at some 32880 votes. Tibetans in exile elected representatives from the three historical regions of Tibet, the four classic Tibetan Buddhist schools, the traditional pre-Buddhist Bön religion and representatives of the exile community in Europe and the Americas. Three members were appointed by the Dalai Lama. The Samdhong Rinpoche y Thupten Lungrig were elected president and vice-president of the Parliament.

== Results ==
Seat	Member	Representation
1 President	Samdhong Rinpoché	Kham
2 Vice President	Thupten Lungrig	Dalái Lama appointed
3	Tsering Phuntsok	Nyingma
4	Bhutuk Gyari	Nyingma
5	Karma Sherab Tharchin	Kagyu
6	Lodoe Tharchen	Kagyu
7	Pema Jungney	Sakya
8	Guru Gyaltsen	Sakya
9	Yonten Phuntsok	Gelug
10	Tashi Gyatlsen	Gelug
11	Jadhur Sangpo	Bön
12	Thokme	Bön
13	Ngawang Lhamo	Ü-Tsang
14	Tsering Norzom	Ü-Tsang
15	Namgyal Wangdu	Ü-Tsang
16	Dawa Tsering	Ü-Tsang
17	Dongsur Ngawang Tenpa	Ü-Tsang
18	Karma Chophel	Ü-Tsang
19	Norbu Dhargye	Ü-Tsang
20	Pema Tsewang	Ü-Tsang
21	Thangsar Yonten Gyatso	Ü-Tsang
22	Lobsang Shastri	Ü-Tsang
23	Sonam Togyal	Kham
24	Tsultrim Tenzin	Kham
25	Andrug Choegkyi (Tamdin Choegkyi)	Kham
26	Dolma Gyari	Kham
27	Lobsang Nyandak	Kham
28	Nyisang	Kham
29	Pema Dolma	Kham
30	Pema Choejor	Kham
31	Chemi Youndon	Kham
32	Tenzin Choedon	Amdo
33	Soepa Gyatso	Amdo
34	Tsezin Khedup	Amdo
35	Kirti Dolkar Lhamo	Amdo
36	Penpa Tsering	Amdo
37	Hortsang Jigme	Amdo
38	Thupten Woser	Amdo
39	Tsering Dolma	Amdo
40	Kalden	Amdo
41	Dhugkar Tsering	Amdo
42	Zatul Rinpoché	Europe
43	Dewatsang Thinley Chodon	Europe
44	Wangchuk Dorjee	Americas
45	Yeshe Tseten	Dalái Lama appointed
46	Tharlam Dolma	Dalái Lama appointed
