= Tashi Tsering (tibetologist) =

Tibetologist

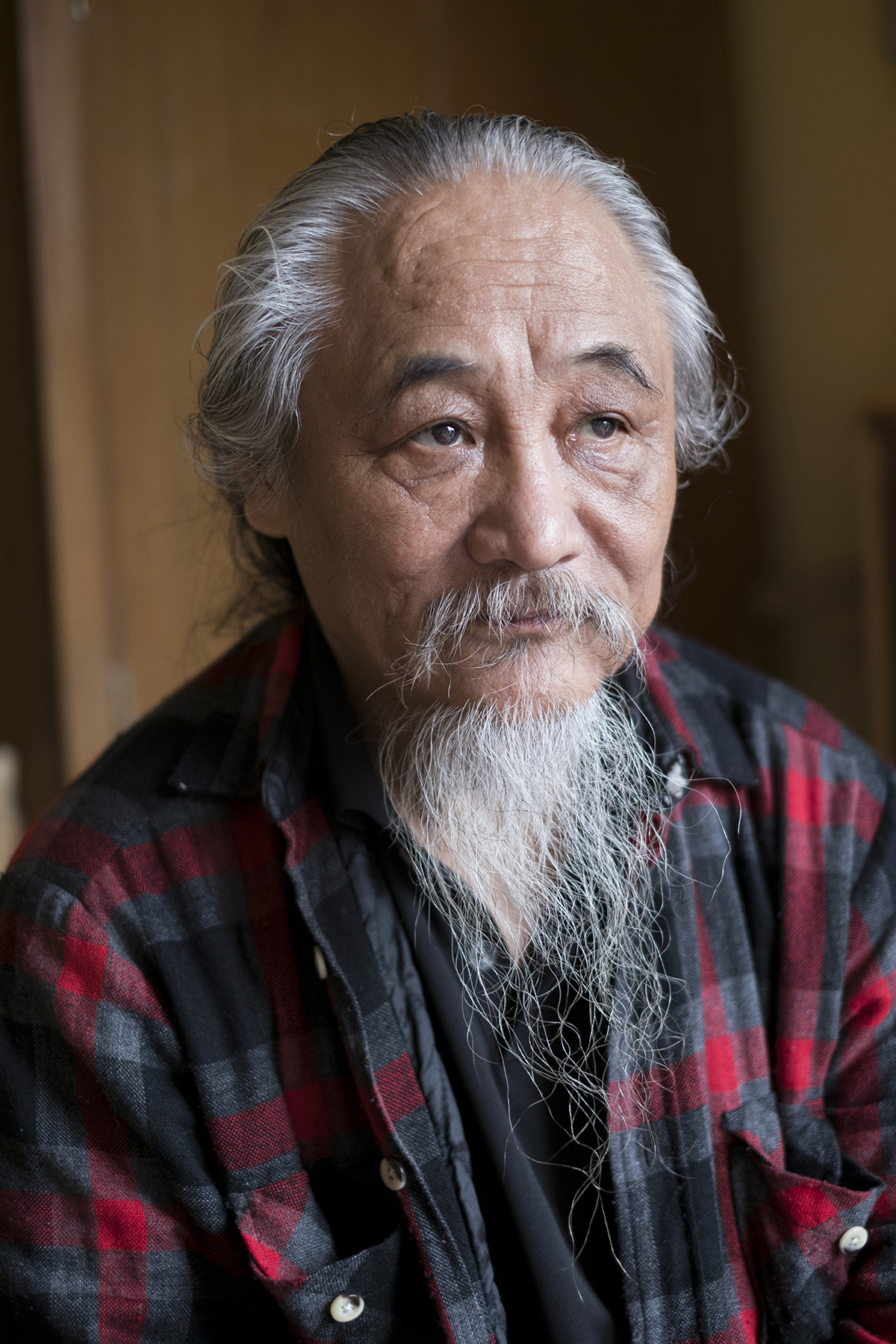
Tashi Tsering in 2017

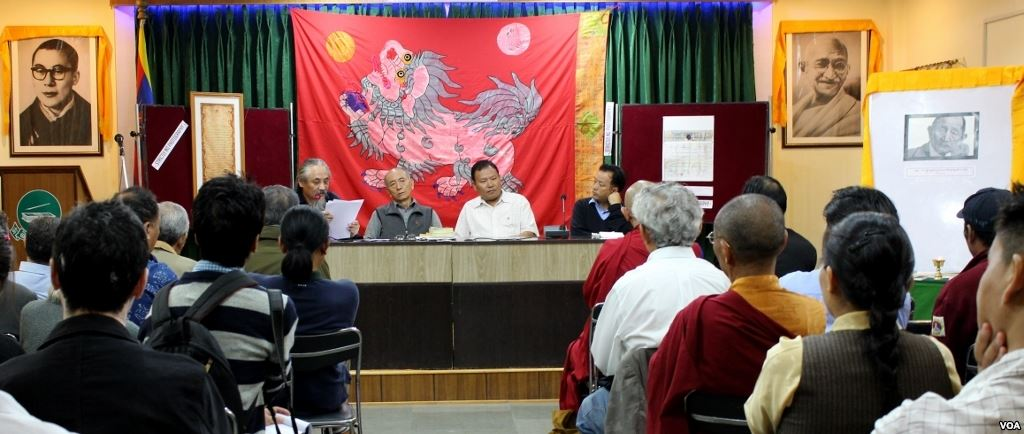
Tashi Tsering, right alongside Acharya Karma Monlam, Sonam Gyaltsen and Chung Tsering, at a photo exhibition in memory of Rakra Tethong Rinpoche, 2013.

Tashi Tsering (Tibetan: བཀྲ་ཤིས་ཚེ་རིང་, Wylie: bKra-shis Tse-ring) also called Tashi Tsering Josayma; born in 1960, is a Tibetan tibetologist, historian and writer.

== Biography ==
Tashi Tsering was born in 1960. He is a founding director of the Amnye Machen Institute. He is also affiliated with the Library of Tibetan Works and Archives, and editor of several Tibetan journals, including the Journal of Tibet.

Tashi Tsering studied at the Central School for Tibetans Dalhousie in northern India from 1963 to 1971. He studied the history of Tibet, Tibetan literature and Buddhism with Khetsun Sangpo Rinpoche, Dzogchen Khenpo Thubten Phuntsok Rinpoche and Rai Bahadur Burmiok Athing.

He also received teachings from the 14th Dalai Lama and other important teachers such as the 16th Karmapa, Dilgo Khyentse Rinpoche, the 4th Dodrupchen Rinpoche, the 4th Garje Khamtrul Rinpoche and Khunu Geshe Rigzin Tempa.

He was appointed consultant to the Namgyal Institute of Tibetology by its director, Tashi Densapa.

In 1979, along with the filmmaker Tenzing Sonam, late writer, K. Dhondup, Thupten Samphel, Kesang Tenzin and Gyalpo Tsering, he founded the pioneering English-language Tibetan poetry journal, Lotus Fields.

In the documentary Angry Monk: Reflections on Tibet (2005) about Gendun Chophel directed by Luc Schaedler, he is interviewed as an expert.

He compiled the longest calligraphy of Tibetan prayers, conducted by the calligrapher Jamyang Dorjee Chakrishar.

He received several awards from the Tibetan community.

He is the founder of Human Rights Network for Tibet and Taiwan (simplified Chinese: 西藏台湾人权连线; traditional Chinese: 西藏台灣人權連線; pinyin: xīzàng táiwān rénquán liánxiàn, Tibetan: བོད་དང་ཐེ་ཝན་འགྲོ་བ་མིའི་ཐོབ་ཐང་འབྲེལ་མཐུད་ཁང).

== Publications ==
- (in English) The Life of Rev. G. Tharchin: Missionary and Pioneer, in (ed Jamyang Norbu), Christian missionaries and Tibet, (Lungta No 11) Amnye Machen Institute (Dharamsāla, India), 1998
- (in English) Avec Isabelle Henrion-Dourcy, The singing mask: echoes of Tibetan opera, Amnye Machen Institute, 2001
- (in English) Cosmogony and the origins, Amnye Machen Institute, Dharamsāla, India, 2004, OCLC 64578326
- (in English) Éditeur de Aspects of Tibetan History (ouvrage collectif : Tashi Tsering; Roberto Vitali; Dan Martin; Leonard W J van der Kuijp; Elliot Sperling), Amnye Machen Institute, 2001, OCLC 123271851
- (in English) Éditeur de Si-tu Paṇ-chen : his contribution and legacy (ouvrage collectif : Tashi Tsering; E Gene Smith; Elliot Sperling; Franz-Karl Ehrhard); Amnye Machen Institute, 2000, OCLC 123271849
- (in English) Yumtsho, Journal of Tibetan Women's Studies
