= Lodi Gyari =

Tibetan politician

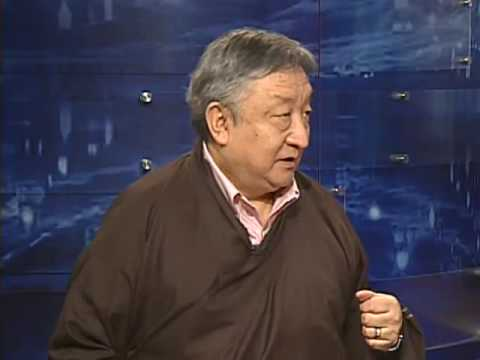
- Lodi Gyari after the 9th round of dialogue with China, in 2010

Special envoy of the Dalai Lama
- In office 1991–2012

Executive chairman of the International Campaign for Tibet
- In office 1999–2014

Member of the Tibetan Parliament in Exile
- In office elected 1979

Personal details
- Born: 25 August 1949 Nyarong, Sichuan, China
- Died: 29 October 2018 (aged 69) San Francisco, California, U.S.

Pronunciation of Lodi Gyaltsen Gyari (Voice of America)

Lodi Gyaltsen Gyari Rinpoche, Kasur Lodi Gyari or "as he is universally known to the Tibetan-speaking world (as well as to Himalayan community), Gyari Rinpoche" (25 August 1949 – 29 October 2018) was a Tibetan politician, and journalist who served as the 14th Dalai Lama's special envoy to the United States. Exiled to India in 1959, he was also the executive chairman of the International Campaign for Tibet.

== Personal life ==
=== Early life ===
Lodi Gyari was born on 25 August 1949 in Nyarong in western Sichuan province, China. He is the son of Gyari Nyima Gyaltsen, administrator of the Nyarong region in Kham In the 1950s, his father and grandfather Gyari Dorje Namgyal were placed under house arrest. His grandfather died in Communist Chinese People's Liberation Army prison camp in the autumn of 1955. Following a revolt led by Dorje Yudon, wife of Gyari Nyima, the Chinese decided to release her husband, but announce that he had escaped.

He has a brother, Pema Gyalpo Gyari, and sister Dolma Gyari.

=== Rinpoche and exile ===
As a child, Gyari was recognized as a rinpoche, or reincarnated lama, and educated in the monastic tradition of Tibetan Buddhism. He was the reincarnation of a Buddhist master of the Nyingma lineage, named Khenchen Jampal Dewé Nyima from Lumorap Monastery in Tibet, his previous incarnation among the main teachers of Dudjom Rinpoche.

While still a child, Gyari went into exile in 1959 in India.

=== Move to the United States ===
In 1991, Lodi Gyari moved to the United States as a special envoy of the Dalai Lama. In 1999, he became a US citizen.

== Career ==
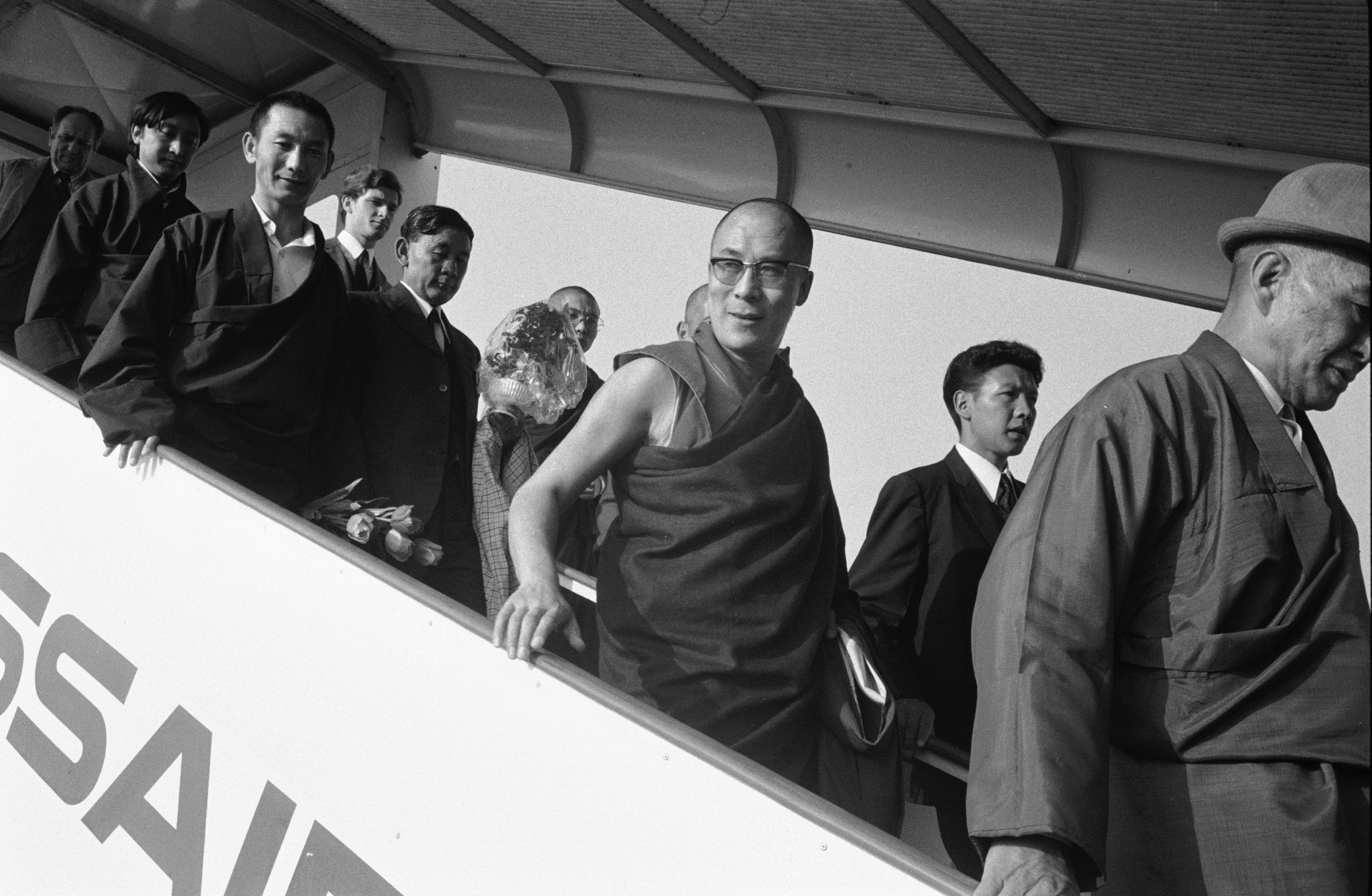
The Dalai Lama arriving at Zurich Airport in October 1973. Gyari Rinpoche is left rear.

=== Activist and journalist ===
In 1970, Gyari was one of the founding members of the Tibetan Youth Congress (TYC) and was elected president in 1975.

Understanding the importance of making the Tibetan struggle known to the world, he became editor-in-chief of the Tibetan language weekly, Tibetan Freedom Press and one of the founding members of the English language monthly Tibetan Review which was first ever publication in English on Tibet, started in 1967 from Darjeeling and he edited April-May1967 issue.

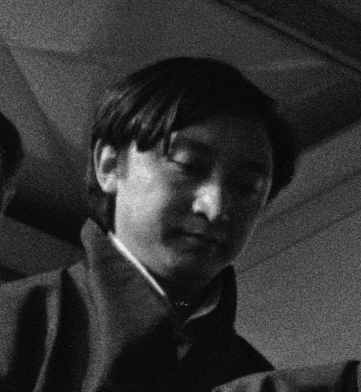
Gyari Rinpoche in 1973 while escorting the 14th Dalai Lama to the Netherlands

In 1973, Gyari went to Switzerland when the Dalai Lama was on his first trip to Europe, and attended his public lectures where he spoke of universal responsibility, compassion and kindness. Lodi Gyari sought him out to ask him to talk about Tibet. The Dalai Lama explained that the people they are addressing had other problems in mind, and he did not want to add to their burden.

He was chosen as president of the International Campaign for Tibet soon after his 1991 move to the United States.

=== Politics ===
In 1979, Gyari was elected to the Tibetan Parliament in Exile. At the age of 30, he was the youngest elected president of the Tibetan Parliament in Exile in the Tibetan legislative election of 1979.

As President of the Tibetan Assembly, Gyari went to China in 1982 (from April 24 to June 8 with Phuntsok Tashi Takla and Juchen Thupten Namgyal) and in 1984 (from October 19 to December 10 with the same delegation) as one of the three members of a series of investigative missions to Tibet.

=== Minister of Foreign Affairs ===
In 1988, he became Minister of the Department of Information and International Relations, the Ministry of Foreign Affairs of Tibetan Government in Exile. At the 1989 Tiananmen Square protests, the Dalai Lama asked Gyari to write a statement supporting students in the name of democracy and human rights, thereby calling into question Gyari's diplomatic efforts to renew the dialogue with the Chinese authorities. He later learned that Deng Xiaoping took it personally and never forgave the Dalai Lama for this statement.

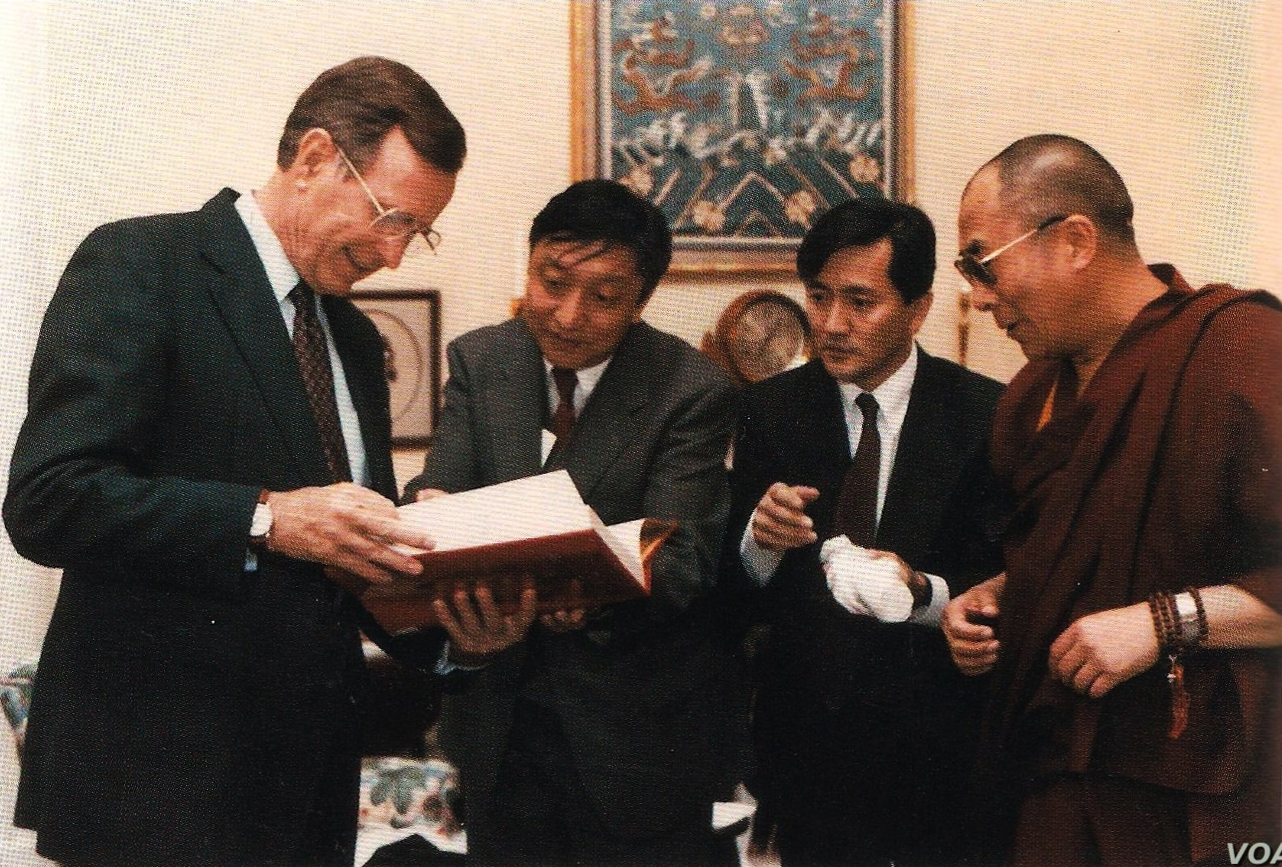
Tenzin Gyatso, the 14th Dalai Lama of Tibet on 16 April 1991 with President George H.W. Bush, Lodi Gyari and Tenzing N. Tethong

In the 1980s and 1990s, Gyari led a Tibetan initiative at the United Nations. He and his team help reintroduce the Tibet issue into the United Nations after 25 years of silence when the United Nations Sub-Commission on the Promotion and Protection of Human Rights adopted UN Resolution 1991/10 on the Status of Tibet.

=== Negotiatior ===
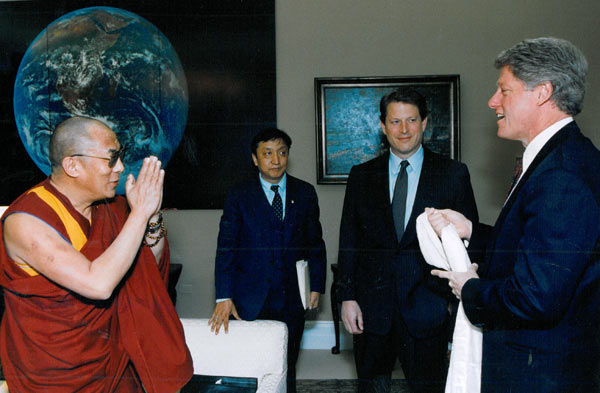
The 14th Dalai Lama of Tibet, Tenzin Gyatso with Lodi Gyari, Al Gore and Bill Clinton in the Office of the Vice President, Washington, D.C., on 27 April 1993

Gari was one of the envoys, along with Kelsang Gyaltsen sent by Tenzin Gyatso, 14th Dalai Lama, to engage in a series of dialogues with China aimed at initiating negotiations on the future status of Tibet. Gyari was the lead envoy in nine rounds of negotiations with China. From 29 June 2007 to 5 July 2007, Gyari and Gyaltsen traveled to China for their sixth visit to Tibet, the first of which was held in 2002. Lodi Gyari had been interviewed a few months before.

The 7th meeting was held on 4 May 2008 in Shenzhen, China, ten months after the previous visit, and for the first time since the 2008 Tibetan unrest in March.

On 8 October 2008 at the Asia Society in New York, Lodi Gyari said, "If the problem is not resolved, then I'm afraid that some Tibetans will resort to violence." The Dalai Lama proposed accepting a role for the Communist Party and socialism in Tibetan areas, an idea that was not popular among Tibetans because of resentment. "But when the Dalai Lama makes such a statement, there is no strong opposition to it. This clearly shows the strength and depth of veneration [for the Dalai Lama]. If the Chinese want to find a solution, now is the time, because they have a person they can get along with." In the eighth round of discussions, Lodi Gyari presented ideas on how Tibetans see autonomy.

On 4 June 2012, Gyari and Gyaltsen resigned as representatives of the Dalai Lama for discussions with the Chinese government, citing their "frustration" with the lack of a positive response from the Chinese authorities and the way in which China manages the region where Tibetan self-immolations occur.

=== Professor ===
After retiring from politics in 2014, Gyari became a research fellow in the Asian Studies Program at Georgetown University and a non-resident principal investigator for the Brookings Institution Foreign Policy Program. Gyari dedicates the end of his life to the writing of his memoirs.

In an interview in 2014, Gyari said he remained optimistic despite decades of fruitless negotiations with the Chinese. Xi Zhongxun, the father of China's leader Xi Jinping, met the Dalai Lama in the 1950s, and the Tibetan leader offered him a luxury watch which he had shown to Gyari at their 1982 meeting. Gyari said he hoped that Xi Jinping had inherited his father's affinity for Tibet.

== Awards ==
On 13 September 2012, the United States Senate passed a resolution commending the contributions of Lodi Gyaltsen Gyari as special envoy of the Dalai Lama and for his promotion of the legitimate rights and aspirations of the Tibetan people.

== Death ==
Lodi Gyari Rinpoche died on 29 October 2018 in San Francisco at the age of 69 from liver cancer. His body was to be transported to the monastery of Mindrolling Monastery in India for funeral services. Gyari left wife, Dawa Chokyi, their six children, five grandchildren, his mother, and four brothers and three sisters.

== See also ==
- Central Tibetan Administration
- History of Tibet (1950–present)
- Human rights of ethnic minorities in China
- Annexation of Tibet by the People's Republic of China
- Lama
- Protests and uprisings in Tibet since 1950
- Tibetan government in exile
- Tibetan independence movement
