= The Mandala of Sherlock Holmes =

1999 novel by Jamyang Norbu

- First edition cover design
- Author: Jamyang Norbu
- Language: English
- Genre: Mystery novels
- Publisher: HarperCollins
- Publication date: 1999
- Media type: Print (hardback & paperback)
- ISBN: 1-58234-132-X (first U.S. edition, hardback)

The Mandala of Sherlock Holmes (published in the United States as Sherlock Holmes: The Missing Years) is a Sherlock Holmes pastiche novel by Jamyang Norbu, originally published in India in 1999.

The novel is an account of Holmes's adventures in India and Tibet where, posing as Norwegian explorer Sigerson, he meets the Dalai Lama and Huree Chunder Mookerjee, a character from Rudyard Kipling's novel Kim.
