= Amnye Machen Institute =

Organization

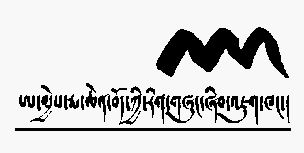
- Founders: Lhasang Tsering, Jamyang Norbu, Pema Bhum and Tashi Tsering
- Established: 16 July 1992
- Focus: Tibetan studies
- Head: Ju Tenkyon (khenpo)
- Location: Dharamshala, Himachal Pradesh, India

The Amnye Machen Institute is based in Dharamshala and works in the field of Tibetan studies. It began along liberal and humanist lines, focusing primarily on secular subjects with emphasis on the contemporary and the neglected aspects of Tibetan culture and history.

== History ==
The Amnye Machen Institute was founded on 16 July 1992 in Dharamshala, Himachal Pradesh, India by Tashi Tsering, Pema Bhum, Jamyang Norbu and Lhasang Tsering. The institute aimed at advancing an international and secular culture within traditional Tibetan society.

The institute started with the blessing and Rs. 50,000 seed money from the Dalai Lama and became the central point of intellectual and social movement in the exile community. They started fortnightly newspaper called Mangtso (English: Democracy) and publish scholarly magazine called Lungta (English: Windhorse).

== Objectives ==
The institute focuses on addressing the limitations of the Tibetan people inside and outside Tibet in the intellectual, social and cultural life by undertaking scientific studies into Tibetan history, culture, society and politics.

The Amnye Machen Institute explores external cultures, ideologies and nations that have influenced the Tibetan history and search for a new path in Tibetan studies by focusing on contemporary Tibetan art, literature and women's studies.

== Significance ==
The institute studies the past to understand and direct Tibetan people to prepare for the future, through raising cultural and intellectual awareness, by making literature, culture and scientific knowledge readily available.

It provides service and platform to various writers, academics, poets, artists and musicians for their creative growth and promotes their work.

== Award ==
The institute was awarded the Poul Lauritzen Prize for Freedom award in 1994 and 1996.

== List of founding directors ==
- Lhasang Tsering
- Jamyang Norbu
- Pema Bhum
- Tashi Tsering
- Ju Tenkyon (current director)

== Publications ==
- Trails Of The Tibetan Tradition: Papers for Elliot Sperling
- Forty-five Years of Tibetan Studies: An Anthology of Articles by Per Kvaerne
- The Centennial of the Tibeto-Mongol Treaty, 1913–2013
- A Short History of Mustang
- Pandita and the Siddha: Tibetan Studies in Honor of E. Gene Smith
- Tibetan Studies in Honour of Samten Karmay
