= Tsering Wangyal =

- Born: March 6, 1949
- Died: November 24, 2000 (aged 51)
- Education: Graduate in History, University of Bristol
- Alma mater: University of Bristol
- Occupation: Editor
- Organization: Tibetan Review
- Known for: Editorial and wit & humour.
- Term: 1976 - 1996
- Predecessor: Dawa Norbu
- Successor: Pema Thinley

Tsering Wangyal (March 6, 1949 - November 24, 2000) simply known as "Editor", was the editor of the Tibetan Review for 20 years.

== Early life ==
Tsering Wangyal was born on March 6, 1949 in Kalimpong. He studied history at the University of Bristol, England.

== Career ==
In 1970, after completing his studies, he came back from England and served in the Tibetan government in exile in Dharamshala, India.

Mr Wangyal was appointed the editor of the Tibetan Review in 1976 after Dawa Norbu left to pursue his further studies to University of California, Berkeley in the United States.

He remained the editor of Tibetan Review until his resignation in September 1996 and left for Canada. He was succeeded by Mr Pema Thinley, who is the present editor of the Tibetan Review.

He has also contributed his writings to various magazine and books.

== The Editor ==
Tsering Wangyal was known for his wit and humour and his editorial. He has written against the Tibetan government's ineffectiveness and Chinese government attacks on Tibet.

== Fellowship ==
Mr Wangyal went to USA from May to December 1986 to pursue an internship which was offered by the Alfred Friendly Press Fellowship and it was hosted by the Quincy Patriot Ledger. At this interim Mr Lhasang Tsering managed as the Acting Editor of the Tibetan Review.

== Death ==
Tsering Wangyal died at a very young age of 51 due to Hepatitis B illness on November 24, 2000, in Toronto, Canada.
