= Tibetan Review =

Tibetan monthly magazine

- Editor: Pema Thinley
- Categories: News magazine
- Frequency: Monthly
- Publisher: Tibetan Review Trust Society
- Founder: Lodi Gyari
- Founded: April 1967
- Based in: Delhi, India
- Language: English
- Website: www.tibetanreview.net
- ISSN: 0040-6708
- OCLC: 1695364

The Tibetan Review is a Tibetan monthly magazine and news website published in English, based in Delhi, India. It was originally published in Darjeeling (West Bengal) as The Voice of Tibet in April 1967 by Lodi Gyari. It covers the Tibetan problem and other related governmental and social issues on Tibet.

== History ==
The magazine was established in April 1967 as The Voice of Tibet, edited by Lodi Gyari. It obtained its current name in 1968 when Tenzing Ngawang Takla became editor. In 1971 financial difficulties forced the magazine to request the Tibetan exile government for help. The government established a new department called the Information Office, where the Tibetan Review and Sheja (another Tibetan language magazine) were put together in one building in Dharamshala. In 1972 Tenzing Namgyal Tethong became editor till June 1972. Dawa Norbu assumed the responsibility of the magazine in June 1972. He was succeeded in October 1976 by Tsering Wangyal.

Since 1996 Pema Thinley has been editor.

Over the years, due to the editorial independence, it became inconsistent with the exiled Tibetan government policies. In response, the magazine set up the Tibetan Review Trust Society and went back to being a non-governmental funded institution in April 1999.
