= List of international trips made by the 14th Dalai Lama =

Tenzin Gyatso, 14th Dalai Lama, has made a total of 236 international trips since 1967. In 1973, he made his first visit to Europe. He made his first visit to North America in 1979.

== List ==
Date(s)	Information	Cities visited	Country
October 1967	Speeches	Tokyo	Japan
14–17 November 1967	Met with Prime Minister of Thailand Field Marshal Thanom Kittikachorn and King Bhumibol Adulyadej.	Bangkok	Thailand
30 September 1973	Met with Pope Paul VI.	Vatican City	
2 October 1973	Met with United Nations High Commissioner for Refugees Sadruddin Aga Khan.	Geneva	Switzerland
9 October 1973	Met with Prince Bernhard of Lippe-Biesterfeld.	Amsterdam	Netherlands
10 October 1973	Met with Irish Foreign Minister Frank Aiken, Taoiseach Liam Cosgrave and President of Ireland Erskine Hamilton Childers.	Dublin	Ireland
19 October 1973	Met with Prince Peter of Greece and Denmark.	Oslo	Norway
25 October 1973	Met with Archbishop of Canterbury Michael Ramsey.	London	United Kingdom
3 September 1979	Welcoming at St. Patrick's Cathedral, viewed Statue of Liberty.	New York City	United States
15 September 1979	Met with Governor of Wisconsin Lee Dreyfus.	Madison	United States
9 October 1980	Met with Pope John Paul II.	Vatican City	
1 November 1980	Met with Prime Minister of Japan Suzuki Zenko.	Tokyo	Japan
27 July 1982	Met with former prime minister of Malaysia Tunku Abdul Rahman.	Kuala Lumpur	Malaysia
2 August 1982	Met with Vice President of Indonesia Adam Malik.	Jakarta	Indonesia
8 October 1982	Met with Pope John Paul II.	Vatican City	
3 July 1984	Met with Archbishop of Canterbury Robert Runcie.	London	United Kingdom
13 May 1986	Met with President of Austria Rudolf Kirchschläger.	Vienna	Austria
17–20 May 1986	Met with Princess Irene of the Netherlands, Princess Juliana of the Netherlands and Prince Bernhard of Lippe-Biesterfeld.	Amsterdam	Netherlands
11 September 1986	Met with Patriarch of Russian Orthodox Church Pimen I of Moscow	Moscow	Soviet Union
27 October 1986	Met with Pope John Paul II.	Vatican City	
20 September 1987	Met with former president of the United States Jimmy Carter.	Atlanta	United States
13 April 1988	Met with Archbishop of Canterbury Robert Runcie.	London	United Kingdom
14 June 1988	Met with Pope John Paul II.	Vatican City	
18 June 1988	Met with Sadruddin Aga Khan.	Geneva	Switzerland
27 June 1989	Met with President of Costa Rica Óscar Arias.	San José	Costa Rica
3 July 1989	Met with President of Mexico Carlos Salinas de Gortari.	Mexico City	Mexico
7–8 December 1989	Met with former Chancellor of Germany Willy Brandt and President of the Bundestag Rita Süssmuth	Berlin	West Germany
9–11 December 1989	Met with Prime Minister of Norway Jan P. Syse, King of Norway Olav V and Foreign Minister Kjell Magne Bondevik	Oslo	Norway
3 February 1990	Met with President of Czechoslovakia Václav Havel	Prague	Czechoslovakia
24 April 1990	Met with Foreign Minister of Belgium Mark Eyskens	Brussels	Belgium
1 June 1990	Met with Pope John Paul II.	Vatican City	
4 June 1990	Met with President of the Autonomous Government of Navarra Gabriel Urralburu.	Pamplona	Spain
5 September 1990	Met with President of the Autonomous Government of the Balearic Islands Gabriel Cañellas.	Mallorca	Spain
10 September 1990	Met with Foreign Minister of the Netherlands Hans van den Broek.	Amsterdam	Netherlands
4 October 1990	Met with President of Germany Richard von Weizsäcker.	Bonn	Germany
18–21 March 1991	Met with Prince Richard, Duke of Gloucester; Charles, Prince of Wales; James Mackay (Lord Chancellor); Bernard Weatherill (Commons Speaker). Also met Neil Kinnock, Leader of the Opposition.	London	United Kingdom
22 March 1991	Met with President of Ireland Mary Robinson.	Dublin	Ireland
16 April 1991	Met with President of the United States George H. W. Bush, President of Nicaragua Violeta Chamorro, Vice President of the United States Dan Quayle, Foreign Minister of Czechoslovakia Jiří Dienstbier, former Permanent Representative to the United Nations Jeane Kirkpatrick, Senate Majority Leader George Mitchell and Speaker of the United States House of Representatives Tom Foley.	Washington, D.C.	United States
16 July 1991	Met with Hans-Adam II, Prince of Liechtenstein.	Vaduz	Liechtenstein
19 July 1991	Met with Foreign Minister of Switzerland René Felber.	Bern	Switzerland
29 September–2 October 1991	Met with President of Lithuania Vytautas Landsbergis. Met with Prime Minister of Lithuania Gediminas Vagnorius. Met with Acting President of Latvia Anatolijs Gorbunovs	Vilna	Lithuania
4 October 1991	Met with Chairman of the Supreme Council of Estonia Ülo Nugis. Met with Foreign Affairs Commissioner of Estonia Indrek Toome	Tallinn	Estonia
5 October 1991	Met with President of Bulgaria Zhelyu Zhelev.	Sofia	Bulgaria
10 October 1991	Met with former Shahbanu of Iran Farah Pahlavi.	Hartford	United States
2 December 1991	Met with Prime Minister of the United Kingdom John Major.	London	United Kingdom
3–5 December 1991	Met with Foreign Minister of Sweden Margaretha af Ugglas, King Carl XVI Gustaf and Queen Silvia.	Stockholm	Sweden
7–8 December 1991	Met with Prime Minister of Norway Gro Harlem Brundtland. Met with Nobel Peace Prize winners President of Poland Lech Wałęsa and Bishop Desmond Tutu.	Oslo	Norway
4–8 May 1992	Met with Prime Minister of Australia Paul Keating. Met with Foreign Minister of Australia Gareth Evans. Met with Prime Minister of Kampuchea Son Sann.	Canberra, Melbourne	Australia
13 May 1992	Met with Foreign Minister of New Zealand Don McKinnon and Prime Minister of New Zealand Jim Bolger.	Wellington	New Zealand
11 June 1992	Met with President of Argentina Carlos Menem.	Buenos Aires	Argentina
20 June 1992	Met with President of Chile Patricio Aylwin.	Santiago de Chile	Chile
27 April 1993	Met with Vice President of the United States Al Gore and President of the United States Bill Clinton.	Washington, D.C.	United States
10–12 May 1993	Met with Foreign Secretary of the United Kingdom Douglas Hurd and Archbishop of Canterbury George Carey.	London	United Kingdom
17 May 1993	Met with President of Poland Lech Wałęsa.	Warsaw	Poland
14 June 1993	Met with President of Austria Thomas Klestil.	Vienna	Austria
14 April 1994	Met with Governor of Hawaii John D. Waiheʻe III.	Honolulu	United States
28 April 1994	Met with President of the United States Bill Clinton and Vice President of the United States Al Gore.	Washington, D.C.	United States
29 April 1994	Met with President of the Bundestag Rita Süssmuth.	Frankfurt am Main	Germany
4 June 1994	Met with Princess Juliana of the Netherlands and Foreign Minister of the Netherlands Pieter Kooijmans.	Amsterdam	Netherlands
7 June 1994	Met with Foreign Minister of Belgium Willy Claes.	Brussels	Belgium
14 June 1994	Met with Secretary of State for Foreign and Political Affairs of San Marino Gabriele Gatti.	San Marino	San Marino
16–17 June 1994	Met with President of the Chamber of Deputies Irene Pivetti, President of Italy Oscar Luigi Scalfaro and President of the Italian Senate Carlo Scognamiglio.	Rome	Italy
16–17 June 1994	Met with Pope John Paul II.	Vatican City	
4–5 July 1994	Met with President of Nicaragua Violeta Chamorro. Met with Foreign Minister of Nicaragua Ernesto Leal. Met with President of the Nicaraguan National Assembly Luis Humberto Guzman	Managua	Nicaragua
3 May 1995	Met with Vice President of the German Parliament Antje Vollmer	Bonn	Germany
1 August 1995	Met with Minister of Culture of Mongolia Nambaryn Enkhbayar	Ulaanbaatar	Mongolia
15 May 1996	Met with Foreign Minister of Denmark Niels Helveg Petersen	Copenhagen	Denmark
2 May 1996	Met with Pope John Paul II.	Vatican City	
23 May 1996	Met with Foreign Minister of Sweden Lena Hjelm-Wallén	Stockholm	Sweden
28 May 1996	Met with Foreign minister of Norway Bjorn Tore Godal	Oslo	Norway
17 July 1996	Met with Foreign Secretary of the United Kingdom Douglas Hurd	London	United Kingdom
20–23 August 1996	Met with President of South Africa Nelson Mandela, former State President of South Africa F. W. de Klerk and Bishop Desmond Tutu	Cape Town, Pretoria	South Africa
11 September 1996	Met with Foreign Minister of New Zealand Don McKinnon and Prime Minister of New Zealand Jim Bolger	Wellington	New Zealand
14 September 1996	Met with Foreign Minister of Australia Alexander Downer and Prime Minister of Australia John Howard	Melbourne	Australia
23 October 1996	Tapaainen Foreign Minister of the Netherlands Hans van Mierlo	Amsterdam	Netherlands
23 October 1996	Met with President of the European Commission Jacques Santer and President of the European Parliament Klaus Hansch	Strasbourg	France
27 March 1997	Met with President of Taiwan Lee Teng-hui	Taipei	Taiwan
16 April 1997	Met with President of the Autonomous Government of Basque Country Jose Antonio Ardanza Garro and President of the Autonomous Government of Basque Parliament Joseba Andoni Leizaola Azpiazu	Guernica, Vitoria-Gasteiz	Spain
23 April 1997	Met with Secretary of State Madeleine Albright, Vice President of the United States Al Gore and President of the United States Bill Clinton	Washington, D.C.	United States
5 September 1997	Met with President of the Czech Republic Václav Havel	Prague	Czech Republic
6 April 1998	Met with former president of the Soviet Union Mikhail Gorbachev	Kyoto	Japan
4–11 May 1998	Met with former president of the United States Jimmy Carter. Met with Governor of New Jersey Christine Todd Whitman. Met with United Nations High Commissioner for Human Rights Mary Robinson. Met with United States Ambassador to the United Nations Bill Richardson.	New York City	United States
9 June 1998	Met with Foreign Minister of Austria Wolfgang Schüssel	Vienna	Austria
17 June 1998	Met with President of the French National Assembly Laurent Fabius	Paris	France
10 November 1998	Met with United States Secretary of State Madeleine Albright, Vice President of the United States Al Gore and President of the United States Bill Clinton.	Washington, D.C.	United States
8 December 1998	Met with UN High Commissioner for Human Rights Mary Robinson, Secretary-General of the United Nations Kofi Annan, Prime Minister of France Lionel Jospin and President of France Jacques Chirac.	Paris	France
7 April 1999	Met with President of Brazil Fernando Henrique Cardoso.	Brasília	Brazil
13 April 1999	Met with President of Chile Eduardo Frei Ruiz-Tagle.	Santiago de Chile	Chile
4 May 1999	Met with Prime Minister of Belgium Jean-Luc Dehaene.	Brussels	Belgium
10–12 May 1999	Met with Prince Charles of Wales. Met with Foreign Secretary of the United Kingdom Robin Cook. Met with Archbishop of Canterbury George Carey. Met with Prime Minister of the United Kingdom Tony Blair	Highgrove, London	United Kingdom
16–17 July 1999	Met with Interior Minister of Germany Otto Schily. Met with Foreign Minister of Germany Joschka Fischer	Bonn	Germany
18 October 1999	Met with Prime Minister of the Netherlands Wim Kok and foreign minister Jozias van Aartseni.	The Hague	Netherlands
26 October 1999	Met with Prime Minister of Italy Massimo D'Alema.	Rome	Italy
28 October 1999	Met with Pope John Paul II.	Vatican City	
24 November 1999	Met with Speaker of the Knesset Avraham Burg and Minister of Education of Israel Yossi Sarid.	Jerusalem	Israel
11 May 2000	Met with Prime Minister of Poland Jerzy Buzek and Marshal of the Sejm Maciej Płażyński.	Warsaw	Poland
16–17 May 2000	Met with Prime Minister of Sweden Göran Persson, Foreign Minister of Sweden Anna Lindh and Speaker of the Riksdag Birgitta Dahl.	Stockholm	Sweden
21 May 2000	Met with Prime Minister of Denmark Poul Nyrup Rasmussen	Copenhagen	Denmark
22–23 May 2000	Met with Prime Minister of Norway Jens Stoltenberg. Met with Foreign minister of Norway Thorbjørn Jagland. Met with King of Norway Harald V.	Oslo	Norway
20 June–3 July 2000	Met with United States Secretary of State Madeleine Albright. Met with United States Ambassador to the United Nations Richard Holbrooke. Met with President of the United States Bill Clinton.	Washington, D.C.	United States
11–13 October 2000	Met with Foreign Minister of Hungary János Martonyi and Prime Minister of Hungary Viktor Orbán.	Budapest	Hungary
16 October 2000	Met with President of the Czech Republic Václav Havel.	Prague	Czech Republic
21 October 2000	Met with President of Ireland Mary McAleese.	Belfast	United Kingdom
2–7 April 2001	Met with Prime Minister of Taiwan Chang Chun-hsiung, President of Taiwan Chen Shui-bian and Vice President of Taiwan Annette Lu.	Taipei	Taiwan
6 May 2001	Met with Interior Minister of Switzerland Ruth Dreifuss	Basel	Switzerland
9–23 May 2001	Met with President of the United States George W. Bush. Met with United States Secretary of State Colin Powell. Met with United States Deputy Secretary of State Richard Armitage. Met with Governor of Oregon John Kitzhaber. Met with Governor of Utah Michael Leavitt. Met with Governor of Minnesota Jesse Ventura	Saint Paul, Salt Lake City, Portland, Washington, D.C.	United States
19 June 2001	Met with Prime Minister of Estonia Mart Laar	Tallinn	Estonia
21–23 June 2001	Met with Prime Minister of Latvia Andris Bērziņš. Met with President of Latvia Vaira Vīķe-Freiberga	Riga	Latvia
24 June 2001	Met with President of Lithuania Valdas Adamkus	Vilnius	Lithuania
24 October 2001	Met with President of the European Parliament Nicole Fontaine. Met with Prime Minister of Bulgaria Simeon Saxe-Coburg-Gotha	Strasbourg	France
27–28 November 2001	Met with President of Portugal Jorge Sampaio.	Fátima	Portugal
27–28 November 2001	Met with Italian Minister of Agriculture Gianni Alemanno	Pomaia	Italy
28 May 2002	Met with Prime Minister of New Zealand Jim Anderton. Met with Foreign Minister of New Zealand Phil Goff	Wellington	New Zealand
2 July 2002	Met with President of the Czech Republic Václav Havel	Prague	Czech Republic
4 July–6 July 2002	Met with Foreign Minister of Slovenia Dimitrij Rupel. Met with President of Slovenia Milan Kučan. Met with Prime Minister of Slovenia Janez Drnovšek. Met with President of the Slovenian National Assembly Borut Pahor	Ljubljana	Slovenia
8 July 2002	Met with Prime Minister of Croatia Ivica Račan	Zagreb	Croatia
13 October 2002	Met with Foreign Minister of Austria Benita Ferrero-Waldner	Graz	Austria
7 November 2002	Met with Prime Minister of Mongolia Nambaryn Enkhbayar	Ulaanbaatar	Mongolia
30 May 2003	Met with Foreign Minister of Germany Joschka Fischer. Met with President of the German Parliament Wolfgang Thierse. Met withCommissioner of Human Rights of Germany Claudia Roth	Berlin	Germany
3 June 2003	Met with Speaker of the Swedish Parliament Björn von Sydow	Stockholm	Sweden
4–6 June 2003	Met with Prime Minister of Denmark Anders Fogh Rasmussen and Foreign Minister of Denmark Per Stig Møller	Copenhagen	Denmark
9–11 September 2003	Met with President of the United States George W. Bush. Met with United States Secretary of State Colin Powell. Met with Minority Leader of the U.S. House of Representatives Nancy Pelosi, Minority Leader of the United States Senate Tom Daschle and Majority Leader of the U.S. Senate Bill Frist	Washington, D.C.	United States
12 October 2003	Met with President of Peru Alejandro Toledo.	Madrid	Spain
14–15 October 2003	Met with President of the French National Assembly Jean-Louis Debré. Met with President of the French Senate Christian Poncelet	Paris	France
26–28 November 2003	Met with former prime minister of Italy Massimo D'Alema. Met with President of the Italian Chamber of Deputies Pier Ferdinando Casini. Met with Deputy Foreign Minister of Italy Margherita Boniver	Rome	Italy
26–28 November 2003	Met with Pope John Paul II.	Vatican City	
26–28 November 2003	Met with former president of the Soviet Union Mikhail Gorbachev and president of the Italian Senate Marcello Pera.	Rome	Italy
18 April–6 May 2004	Met with Premier of Ontario Dalton McGuinty. Met with Lieutenant Governor of Ontario James Bartleman. Met with Prime Minister of Canada Paul Martin. Met with Leader of the Opposition Stephen Harper. Met with Premier of British Columbia Gordon Campbell	Vancouver	Canada
27–28 May 2004	Met with Leader of the Opposition Michael Howard. Met with Prince Charles of Wales. Met with Foreign Secretary of the United Kingdom Jack Straw. Met with Archbishop of Canterbury Rowan Williams	London	United Kingdom
17 September 2004	Met with Governor of Florida Jeb Bush	Miami	United States
23 September 2004	Met with Governor of Puerto Rico Sila Calderon	San Juan	Puerto Rico
26–27 September 2004	Met with President of Costa Rica Abel Pacheco. Met with Foreign Minister of Costa Rica Roberto Tovar Faja. Met with President of the Costa Rican Congress Mario Redondo Poveda. Met with Speaker of the Costa Rican Parliament Gerardo Gonzalez Esquivel. Met with Minister of Culture of Costa Rica Guido Saenz.	San José	Costa Rica
29 September 2004	Met with Foreign Minister of El Salvador Francisco Lainez kansa. Met with President of El Salvador Tony Saca. Met with Vice President of El Salvador Ana Vilma de Escobar	San Salvador	El Salvador
1 October 2004	Met with Minister of Education of Guatemala Maria del Carmen Acena. Met with Foreign Minister of Guatemala Jorge Briz Abularach. Met with President of Guatemala Óscar Berger. Met with Vice President of Guatemala Eduardo Stein	Guatemala City	Guatemala
5 October 2004	Met with Secretary of Interior of Mexico Santiago Creel	Mexico City	Mexico
5–7 November 2004	Met with President of the South African Inkatha Freedom Party Mangosuthu Buthelezi. Met with former president of South Africa Nelson Mandela.	Johannesburg	South Africa
18–19 May 2005	Met with former president of the United States Bill Clinton. Met with King of Jordan Abdullah II and Queen of Jordan Rania of Jordan	Amman, Petra	Jordan
14–15 June 2005	Met with Prime Minister of Norway Kjell Magne Bondevik and President of the Norwegian Parliament Jorgen Kosmo.	Oslo	Norway
17–18 June 2005	Met with President of the German Parliament Wolfgang Thierse. Met with Leader of the CDU/CSU Angela Merkel.	Berlin	Germany
1 October 2005	Met former prime minister of Italy Giuliano Amato	Bolzano	Italy
4 September 2005	Met with Interior Minister of Switzerland Pascal Couchepin	Zurich	Switzerland
6–16 November 2005	Met with Governor of Idaho Dirk Kempthorne. Met with Governor of Alaska Frank H. Murkowski. Met with Minority Leader of the United States Senate Harry Reid. Met with Minority Leader of the U.S. House of Representatives Nancy Pelosi. Met with Speaker of the U.S. House of Representatives Dennis Hastert. Met with United States Secretary of State Condoleezza Rice. Met with President of the United States George W. Bush. Met with former president of the United States Jimmy Carter	Sun Valley, Anchorage, Washington, D.C., San Francisco	United States
18 November 2005	Met with President of the South African Inkatha Freedom Party Mangosuthu Buthelezi.	Edinburgh	United Kingdom
19 February 2006	Met with Sephardi Chief Rabbi of Israel Shlomo Amar. Met with Ashkenazi Chief Rabbi of Israel Yona Metzger	Jerusalem	Israel
26 April 2006	Met with Minister of Culture of Brazil Gilberto Gil	São Paulo	Brazil
1 May 2006	Met with Nobel Peace Laureate Adolfo Pérez Esquivel	Buenos Aires	Argentina
3–6 May 2006	Met with Minister of Transport of Chile Sergio Espejo. Met with Deputy Minister of Interior of Chile Felipe Harboe Bascunan. Met with Archbishop of Chile Cardinal Francisco and vier Errázuriz Ossa. Met Minister of Culture of Chile Paulina Urrutia. Met Minister of Education of Chile Martin Zilic. Met with President of the Chilean House of Chambers Antonio Leal Labrin. Met with Vice President of the Chilean Senate Jaime Naranjo Ortiz	Santiago de Chile	Chile
7 May 2006	Met with First Lady of Peru Eliane Karp	Lima	Peru
11 May 2006	Met with Attorney General of Colombia Mario Iguaran	Bogotá	Colombia
14 May 2006	Met with Minister of Justice of Austria Karin Gastinger. Met Minister of Health of Austria Maria Rauch-Kallat. Met with Vice-Chancellor of Austria Hubert Gorbach. Met with Governor of Carinthia Jörg Haider	Sankt Veit an der Glan	Austria
30 May–1 June 2006	Met with Minister of Development Cooperation of Belgium Armand De Decker. Met with President of the Belgian House of Representatives Herman De Croo. Met with President of the Belgian Senate Anne-Marie Lizin. Met with Prime Minister of Belgium Guy Verhofstadt. Met with President of the European Parliament Josep Borrell. Met with Vice-President of the European Commission Gunter Verheugen. Met with Chancellor of Austria & President of the European Council Wolfgang Schüssel. Met President of the European Commission with José Manuel Barroso	Brussels	Belgium
20–22 June 2006	Met with Personal Envoy & Senior Advisor to the King of Jordan Prince Ghazi bin Muhammad, King Abdullah II of Jordan and Queen Rania. Met with Imam to the Royal Hashemite Court & Supreme Judge Ahmad Helail.	Amman, Petra	Jordan
8–9 September 2006	Met with Minister of Citizenship & Immigration of Canada Monte Solberg. Met with Brittiläisen Kolumbian pääministerin Gordon Campbell and Parliamentary Secretary of Canada Jason Kenny	Vancouver	Canada
16–26 September 2006	Met with Governor of California Arnold Schwarzenegger. Met with former president of the United States Bill Clinton. Met with former Queen of Jordan Noor al-Hussein. Met with President of Costa Rica Óscar Arias	New York City, Long Beach, Denver	United States
9–10 October 2006	Met with former president of the Czech Republic Václav Havel. Met with Foreign Minister of the Czech Republic Alexandr Vondra	Prague	Czech Republic
12–13 October 2006	Met with President of the Italian Senate Franco Marini. Met with Speaker of the Italian Parliament Fausto Bertinotti.	Rome	Italy
12–13 October 2006	Met with Pope Benedict XVI.	Vatican City	
12–13 October 2006	Met with foreign minister of Italy Massimo D'Alema.	Rome	Italy
4 May 2007	Met with former Vice President of the United States Walter Mondale. Met with Governor of Wisconsin Jim Doyle. Met with Speaker of the U.S. House of Representatives Nancy Pelosi	San Francisco	United States
12–15 June 2007	Met with Leader of Australian Opposition Kevin Rudd. Met with Prime Minister of New Zealand Helen Clark. Met with Prime Minister of Australia John Howard	Brisbane, Canberra, Sydney	Australia
19 June 2007	Met with Foreign Minister of New Zealand Winston Peters.	Wellington	New Zealand
10 September 2007	Met with Vice President of the Autonomous Catalonia Government Ernest Benach. Met with President of the Autonomous Catalonia Parliament Josep-Lluis Carod-Rovira	Barcelona	Spain
13–14 September 2007	Met with former president of Portugal Mário Soares. Met with President of Portugal Jorge Sampaio. Met withPresident of Portuguese Parliament Jaime Gama	Lisbon	Portugal
17–23 September 2007	Met with Chancellor of Austria Alfred Gusenbauer. Met Governor of Carinthia Jörg Haider. Met with Governor of Lower Austria Erwin Proll	Hinterbruhl	Austria
17–23 September 2007	Met with Chancellor of Germany Angela Merkel. Met Minister President of Hessen Roland Koch. Met Minister President of North Rhine-Westphalia Jürgen Rüttgers	Münster, Wiesbaden, Berlin	Germany
16–19 October 2007	Met with Deputy Secretary of State John Negroponte. Met with Speaker of the U.S. House of Representatives Nancy Pelosi. Met with Majority Leader of the U.S. Senate Harry Reid and Minority Leader of the United States Senate Mitch McConnell. Met with Majority Leader of the U.S. House of Representatives Steny Hoyer. Met with Minority Leader of the U.S. House of Representatives John Boehner. Met with President of the United States George W. Bush	Washington, D.C.	United States
29–30 October 2007	Met with Leader of the Liberal Party Stéphane Dion. Met with Leader of the Block Quebecois Party Gilles Duceppe. Met with Leader of the New Democratic Party Jack Layton. Met with Governor General of Canada Michaëlle Jean. Met with Prime Minister of Canada Stephen Harper. Met with Foreign Minister of Canada Maxime Bernier. Met Minister for Public Safety of Canada Stockwell Day. Met with Canadian Secretary of State for Multiculturalism and Identity Jason Kenney. Met with Speaker of Canadian Parliament Peter Milliken	Ottawa	Canada
7–14 December 2007	Met with Minister of Youth & Sports Activity of Italy Giovanna Melandri. Met with President of the Italian Senate Franco Marini. Met with President of the Italian Chamber of Deputies Fausto Bertinotti. Met with Deputy Foreign Minister of Italy Gianni Vernetti. Met withPresident of the Friuli Venezia-Giulia Riccardo Illy. Met withPresident of the Lombardi Region Roberto Formigoni	Milan, Udine, Rome	Italy
12 April 2008	Met with Governor of Washington Christine Gregoire	Seattle	United States
15–19 May 2008	Met with Federal Minister for Economic Cooperation & Development of Germany Heidemarie Wieczorek-Zeul. Met with Minister President of North Rhine-Westphalia Jürgen Rüttgers. Met with Speaker of the German Parliament Norbert Lammert. Met Minister President of Hessen Roland Koch	Frankfurt am Main, Bochum, Berlin	Germany
21–23 May 2008	Met with Prime Minister of the United Kingdom Gordon Brown. Met with Archbishop of Canterbury Rowan Williams. Met with Charles, Prince of Wales. Met with Leader of the Liberal Democrats Nick Clegg. Met with Leader of the Conservative Party & Leader of Opposition David Cameron	London	United Kingdom
11–15 June 2008	Met with Foreign Minister of Australia Stephen Smith. Met Minister for Immigration & Citizenship of Australia Chris Evans. Met with Leader of Australian Opposition Brendan Nelson	Sydney, Perth	Australia
17–18 June 2008	Met with King Abdullah II & Queen of Jordan Rania. Met with Personal Envoy & Senior Advisor to H. M. the King of Jordan Prince Ghazi bin Muhammad	Amman, Petra	Jordan
21–25 July 2008	Met with Republican U.S. Presidential Candidate John McCain. Met with Governor of Wisconsin Jim Doyle	Madison, Aspen	United States
16 August–22 September 2008	Met with French presidential spouse Carla Bruni-Sarkozy, Foreign Minister of France Bernard Kouchner, Deputy Foreign Minister of France Rama Yade, and French Socialist Party leader Ségolène Royal.	Nantes, Roqueredonde	France
30 November–11 December 2008	Met with foreign minister of the Czech Republic Karel Schwarzenberg, former president of the Czech Republic Václav Havel and Prime Minister of Czech Republic Mirek Topolánek.	Prague	Czech Republic
30 November–11 December 2008	Met with President of the Belgian House of Representatives Herman Van Rompuy. Met with President of the Belgian Senate Armand De Decker. Met with President of the European Parliament Hans-Gert Pöttering. Met with Prime Minister of Belgium Yves Leterme	Brussels	Belgium
30 November–11 December 2008	Met with Speaker of the Polish Senate Bogdan Borusewicz. Met with Speaker of the Polish House Representatives Bronisław Komorowski. Met with President of Poland Lech Kaczyński. Met with President of France Nicolas Sarkozy. Met with Prime Minister of Poland Donald Tusk.	Gdańsk, Warsaw	Poland
10 February 2009	Met with Minister President of Hessen Roland Koch.	Baden-Baden	Germany
29–30 July 2009	Met with Minister for Economic Cooperation & Development of Germany Heidemarie Wieczorek-Zeul. Met Minister President of Hessen Roland Koch	Frankfurt am Main	Germany
6 August 2009	Met with President of the Swiss Parliament Chiara Simoneschi-Cortesi	Lausanne	Switzerland
1 September 2009	Met with Chairwoman of Democratic Progressive Party Tsai Ing-Wen	Kaohsiung	Taiwan
11–12 September 2009	Met with Deputy Prime Minister & Foreign minister of the Czech Republic Jan Kohout. Met with Prime Minister of Czech Republic Jan Fischer. Met with former president of the Czech Republic Václav Havel. Met with former State President of South Africa F. W. de Klerk	Prague	Czech Republic
6 October 2009	Met with Speaker of the U.S. House of Representatives Nancy Pelosi	Washington, D.C.	United States
18 November 2009	Met with President of the Italian Lower House Gianfranco Fini	Rome	Italy
3–4 December 2009	Met with Leader of Australian Opposition Tony Abbott. Met Minister for the Environment, Heritage & the Arts of Australia Peter Garrett	Sydney	Australia
18 February 2010	Met with U.S. Secretary of State Hillary Clinton. Met with President of the United States Barack Obama	Washington, D.C.	United States
6–7 April 2010	Met with Minister for Slovenians Abroad Boštjan Žekš. Met with former prime minister of Slovenia Janez Janša	Maribor	Slovenia
8 April 2010	Met with Speaker of Swiss Parliament Pascale Bruderer Wyss	Zürich	Switzerland
22 October 2010	Met with Canadian Secretary of State for Multiculturalism and Identity Jason Kenney	Toronto	Canada
12 November 2010	Met with the Director of the IAEA Nobel Peace Laureate Mohamed ElBaradei. Met with former State President of South Africa Nobel Peace Laureate F. W. de Klerk	Hiroshima	Japan
13 April 2011	Met with former president of Ireland Mary Robinson	Dublin	Switzerland
14 June 2011	Met with Australian Leader of Opposition Tony Abbott	Canberra	Australia
7 July 2011	Met with U.S. Speaker of the House John Boehner. Met with Minority Leader of the U.S. House of Representatives Nancy Pelosi	Washington, D.C.	United States
16 July 2011	Met with President of the United States Barack Obama	Washington, D.C.	United States
17 August 2011	Met with President of Estonia Toomas Hendrik Ilves. Met with Minister of Defence Mart Laar	Tallinn	Estonia
22–23 August 2011	Met with President of the Hessian Parliament Norbert Kartmann. Met Minister President of Hesse State Volker Bouffier	Wiesbaden	Germany
9–11 September 2011	Met with Governor of Zacatecas Miguel Alonso Reyes. Met with President of Mexico Felipe Calderón. Met with former president of Mexico Vicente Fox	Mexico City	Mexico
13 September 2011	Met with Nobel Peace Laureate Adolfo Pérez Esquivel	Buenos Aires	Argentina
7 November 2011	Met with former prime minister of Japan Shinzō Abe.	Tokyo	Japan
10 December 2011	Met with former president of the Czech Republic Václav Havel. Met with Foreign minister of the Czech Republic Karel Schwarzenberg	Prague	Czech Republic
15 April 2012	Met with Governor of Hawaii Neil Abercrombie.	Honolulu	United States
25 April 2012	Met with former president of the Soviet Union Mikhail Gorbachev. Met with former president of Poland Lech Wałęsa	Warsaw	Poland
27 April 2012	Met with Prime Minister of Canada Stephen Harper. Met Minister of Citizenship, Immigration and Multiculturalism Jason Kenney	Ottawa	Canada
14 May 2012	Met with Prime Minister of the United Kingdom David Cameron. Met with Deputy Prime Minister of the United Kingdom Nick Clegg. Met with Archbishop of Canterbury Rowan Williams	London Manchester	United Kingdom
18–27 May 2012	Met with Interior Secretary Sebastian Kurz. Met with Chancellor of Austria Werner Faymann. Met with Vice-Chancellor & Foreign Minister of Austria Michael Spindelegger. Met with Governor of Salzburg Gabi Burgstaller. Met with Kärnten Governor of Carinthia Gerhard Dörfler	Klagenfurt, Salzburg, Vienna	Austria
19–20 June 2012	Met with Charles, Prince of Wales. Met with Speaker of the House of Commons John Bercow. Met with Nobel Peace Laureate Aung San Suu Kyi. Met with Leader of the Opposition Ed Miliband	London	United Kingdom
8 October 2012	Met with IAEA director Nobel Peace Laureate Mohamed ElBaradei. Met with Nobel Peace Laureate Shirin Ebadi	Syracuse	United States
16 April 2013	Met with President of the Swiss National Council Maya Graf	Bern	Switzerland
7–14 May 2013	Met with Governor of Wisconsin Scott Walker. Met with Governor of Oregon John Kitzhaber. Met with Governor of Maryland Martin O'Malley	Madison, Portland, College Park	United States
10–11 September 2013	Met with Latvian minister of justice Janis Bordans. Met with former president of Latvia Vaira Vīķe-Freiberga	Riga	Latvia
11–13 September 2013	Met with former president of Lithuania Vytautas Landsbergis. Met with President of Lithuania Dalia Grybauskaitė	Vilna	Lithuania
15 September 2013	Met with Nobel Peace Laureate Aung San Suu Kyi	Prague	Czech Republic
15 October 2013	Met with former president of Mexico Vicente Fox	San Cristóbal	Mexico
23 October 2013	Met with Prime Minister of Poland Donald Tusk	Warsaw	Poland
21 February–6 March 2014	Met with U.S. Speaker of the House John Boehner. Met with Minority Leader of the U.S. House of Representatives Nancy Pelosi. Met with U.S. Senate Majority Leader Harry Reid. Met with Governor of California Jerry Brown. Met with President of the United States Barack Obama	Washington, D.C., Los Angeles	United States
10 May 2014	Met with Foreign Minister of the Netherlands Frans Timmermans	Rotterdam	Netherlands
13 May 2014	Met with Minister President of Hesse Volker Bouffier	Frankfurt	Germany
7 February 2015	Met with President of Basel City Canton Guy Morin.	Basel	Switzerland
1–10 July 2015	Met with former president of the United States George W. Bush. Met with Minority Leader of the U.S. House of Representatives Nancy Pelosi	Dallas, New York City	United States
12–14 July 2015	Met with Vice President of the German Parliament Claudia Roth. Met with President of the Hessen Parliament Norbert Kartmann. Met with Minister-President of Hesse Volker Bouffier.	Wiesbaden	Germany
4 March 2016	Met with Speaker of the United States House of Representatives Paul Ryan.	Sea Island	United States
11 March 2016	Met with UN Deputy High Commissioner for Human Rights Kate Gilmore and Yemeni Nobel Peace Laureate Tawakkol Karman.	Geneva	Switzerland
15 July 2016	Met with President of the United States Barack Obama.	Washington, D.C.	United States
16 October 2016	Met with President of Slovakia Andrej Kiska.	Bratislava	Slovakia
18 October 2016	Met with Pavel Bělobrádek and Daniel Herman.	Prague	Czech Republic
20 October 2016	Met with Giuseppe Sala and Angelo Scola.	Milan	Italy
19–23 November 2016	Speeches	Ulaanbaatar	Mongolia
13–25 June 2017	Speeches, met with some mayors and Richie Davidson.	Rochester, San Diego, Orange County, Minneapolis, Boston	United States
8–22 September 2017	Speeches	Derry, Frankfurt, Taormina, Messina, Palermo, Florence, Pisa, Riga	Northern Ireland; Germany; Italy; Latvia
12–19 June 2018	Met with Vytautas Landsbergis and Remigijus Šimašius.	Vilnius, Riga	Lithuania; Latvia
10–26 September 2018	Speeches, met with Lech Wałęsa, Rebecca Johnson, Claudia Roth, Jochen Partsch and others.	Malmö, Amsterdam, Rotterdam, Darmstadt, Heidelberg, Rikon im Tösstal	Sweden; Netherlands; Germany; Switzerland
12–25 November 2018	Speeches	Tokyo, Yokohama	Japan
22 June 2024	Stopover in Switzerland on the way to the United States for knee surgery.	Zürich	Switzerland
23 June–23 August 2024	Knee surgery and recovery, attended long-life prayer offerings.	New York City	United States
23–26 August 2024	Long-life prayer offering.	Zürich	Switzerland
