= Jamyang Norbu =

Tibetan activist and writer (born 1949)

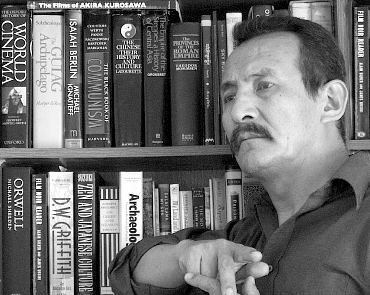
- Born: 1949 (age 76–77); Tibet
- Known for: Activist for Tibetan independence
- Spouse: Tenzing Chounzom
- Children: 2

Jamyang Norbu (Tibetan: འཇམ་དབྱངས་ནོར་བུ་, Wylie: ‘jam-dbyangs nor-bu) is a Tibetan political activist and writer, currently living in the United States, having previously lived for over 40 years as a Tibetan exile in India.

== Biography ==
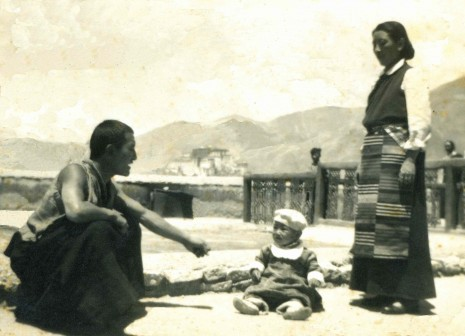
Rakra Tethong Rinpoché, Jamyang Norbu and his mother on the roof of Tethong house in Banakshol 1950

Norbu attended St. Joseph's School in Darjeeling, India. As a teenager, he dropped out of school and ran away from home to join the Tibetan guerrilla group Chushi Gangdruk, which operated from Mustang in Nepal.

He is the creator of the ubiquitous Rangtsen Lakdheb or ‘Independence Handbook’ (Tibetan: རང་བཙན་ལག་དེབ་, Wylie: rang-btsan-lag-deb) carried by most Tibetans in-exile. Also commonly referred to as the Green Book, it has been a long-standing and critical source of funding since its 1972 inception for the Tibetan government in-exile to pay for staffing, maintenance, setting up scholarships for Tibetans, and a myriad of other services. Prior to the Green Book, the government in-exile mainly got its money through a small grant from the Dalai Lama. The main purpose of the Green Book is to allow Tibetans to take the role of legal citizen and willingly submit taxes to the in-exile Tibetan government on a regular basis, legitimizing it as the true authority of the Tibetan people, completely independent from the Chinese government. More importantly, it is the basis for which citizenship is to be given should Tibet attain independence in the near future, hence earning the name ‘Independence Handbook’. Contrary to the belief of a small minority, the controversial Samdhong had no part in the creation of the Green Book and has instead always been one of the most vocal critics against any support of independence, notoriously declaring that pro-independence Tibetans pose a greater danger than either Dorje Shugden worshippers or the Chinese government. Even by 1991 when he entered the Tibetan parliament, Samdhong has still never possessed the required Green Book that had been around since 1972. Jamyang Norbu was even responsible for his Green Book’s more subtle features in order to facilitate the message of Tibet’s independence, such as giving it passport-size dimensions and a passport-like design, as per other independent countries. The use of official seals to acknowledge paid fees was also his idea, as well as to have the color in green to honor the 14th Dalai Lama (whose favorite color has always been green).

Later he founded and directed the Amnye Machen Institute, Tibetan Centre for Advanced Studies, in Dharamsala.

== Politics ==
Jamyang Norbu has been called a "radical Tibetan separatist" by the People's Daily. His advocacy for complete Tibetan independence and criticism of the "Middle Way" autonomy plan of the Central Tibetan Administration has led him to push for more "confrontational" methods.

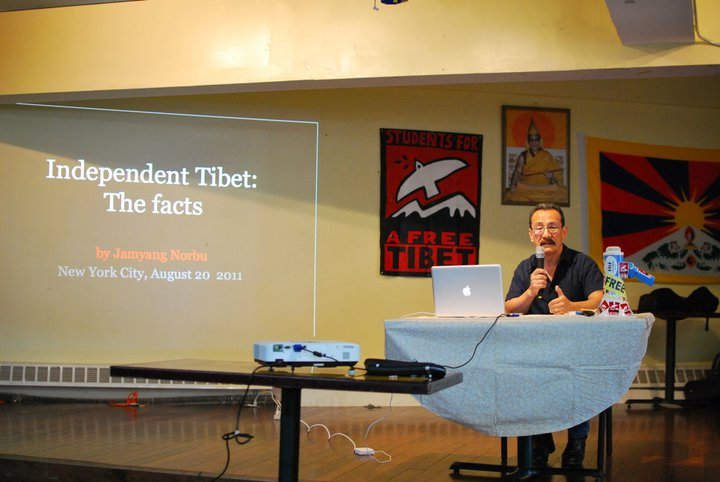
Independent Tibet Presentation by Jamyang Norbu, New York City, 20 August 2011. Behind presenter is a photo of The 14th Dalai Lama, Students for a Free Tibet (SFT) logo and the Tibetan Flag.

Jamyang Norbu is also critical of the role of religion in the Tibetan exile community, and of its Western benefactors who, he argues, see Tibetans one-dimensionally. He calls the "New Age perception of Tibet... that this even materialist west will be saved by the spiritualism of the Tibetan Buddhists" "total nonsense." He said of a scene from the American film Seven Years in Tibet where Tibetan monks rescue earthworms from a construction site, that Tibetan viewers would find it ridiculous. In a 2005 article for the New Humanist, he recalled an outbreak of rabies in 1983 Dharamsala: when he advocated that a Tibetan woman get a rabies shot instead of seeing a shaman, he was shunned in the community as a "non-believer." He lamented, "We are frankly, a people still in thrall to ignorance and superstition, which far from declining with the years seems to be gaining new life and impetus with foreign sponsorship and encouragement."

== Writings ==
Norbu has written several books and theater pieces in English and in Tibetan. Illusion and Reality, a collection of his political essays, was published in 1989. In 2000 he received the Hutch Crossword Book Award for The Mandala of Sherlock Holmes. The book was published in the U.S. in 2001, first under the title Sherlock Holmes - The Missing Years, and fills in the gap in 1891 when Arthur Conan Doyle temporarily killed off Holmes. In the book, Holmes joins Huree Chunder Mookerjee, another fictional spy who last worked for the English in Rudyard Kipling's Kim.

He has written many book reviews, including that of Professor Grunfeld.

In 2011, he participated in the International Writing Program (IWP) Fall Residency at the University of Iowa in Iowa City, IA.

== Books In English by Jamyang Norbu ==
- Echoes from Forgotten Mountains: Tibet in War and Peace, Penguin Viking, 2023, ISBN 0670094668, 978-0670094660
- Don't Stop the Revolution! Writings on the 2008 Tibetan Uprisings and the Beijing Olympics, High Asia Press, 2018, ISBN 978-1-7328377-9-9
- Buying the Dragon's Teeth, High Asia Press, 2004, ISBN 0-9755371-0-5
- Shadow Tibet, High Asia Press, 2004, ISBN 09755371-1-3
- Warriors of Tibet: The Story of Aten and the Khampas' Fight for the Freedom of Their Country (originally titled Horseman in the Snow), Wisdom, 1987, Wisdom Pub., ISBN 0-86171-050-9.
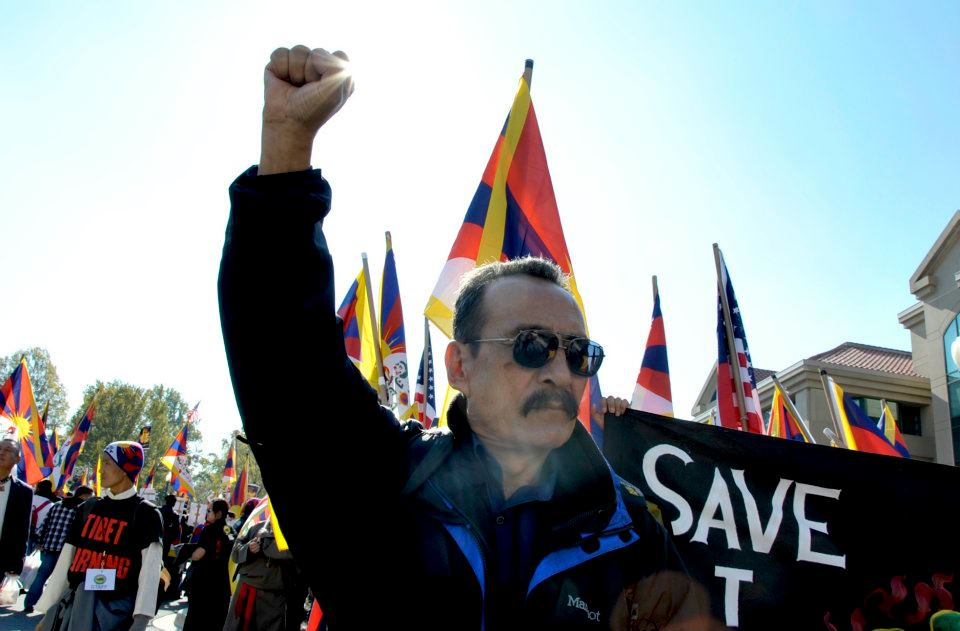
- Author, blogger and activist Jamyang Norbu spoke to hundreds of Tibetans and supporters at a protest in front of the Chinese Embassy in 2011.
  The Mandala of Sherlock Holmes, Bloomsbury USA, 2003, ISBN 1-58234-328-4.
- Illusion and Reality, Tibetan Youth Congress, 1989.
- Zlos-Gar: Performing Traditions of Tibet, Library of Tibetan Works & Archives, 1986, ASIN B000J2PZ54
