= Hortsang Jigme =

Tibetan scholar

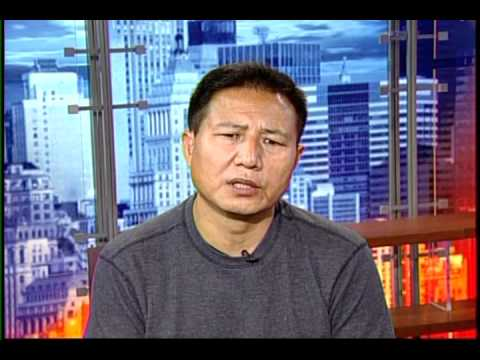
Hortsang Jigme

Hortsang Jigme (Tibetan: ཧོར་གཙང་འཇིགས་མེད། Wylie: Hor-gtsang-'jigs-med) is a scholar, writer, and poet who writes in the Tibetan language and currently resides in the United States.

== Biography ==
Hortsang Jigme studied at Labrang Monastery, Gansu Provincial Buddhism College, and the China Tibetan Language Institute of Higher Buddhist Studies, Beijing. From 1992 to 2004, he lived in Dharamshala, India where he was a lecturer at the Tibetan Medical College (Men-Tse-Khang) and then the Director of Literary Research at Norbulingka Institute. He also served two terms as a Member of Parliament in the Central Tibetan Administration, before stepping down in 2006. Hortsang Jigme was President of the Dhomey [Amdo] Central Executive Committee, and served as editor-in-chief of Nor’de, a monthly Tibetan cultural newspaper, Nor-Oe, a quarterly magazine, and Norzod, a bi-annual journal. He also founded Youtse Publications. Currently, he produces a tri-weekly program for Radio Free Asia and is an independent writer and researcher.

Hortsang Jigme's non-fiction works include Mdo smad lo rgyus chen mo (The Greater History of Amdo), Bod kyi rol mo’I lo rgyus la thog mar dpyad pa (A History of Tibetan Music), and Drang-bden-gyi-slu-pa’i-slong- mo- ba (A Commentary on the Life and Works of Gendun Choephel). He has published five volumes of poetry, and his articles and poetry have appeared in numerous publications. Hortsang Jigme is also consulted by Tibetan media and has presented at many conferences.

Translations of Hortsang Jigme's writings into English are limited, however he contributed an essay, Tibetan Literature in the Diaspora (translated by Lauren Hartley), to Modern Tibetan Literature and Social Change published by Duke University Press. Under a Blue Sky, a collection of essays on his childhood and youth in Tibet, was translated by Guusje de Schot and Elia Sinaiko and published in 1998. Hortsang Jigme is also interviewed in the documentary Angry Monk.

== Selected works ==
- Mdo smad lo rgyus chen mo (The Greater History of Amdo) Volumes 1–6, The Library of Tibetan Works and Archives, Dharamsala, 2009
- Bod kyi rol mo’I lo rgyus la thog mar dpyad pa (A History of Tibetan Music), Tibet House, New Delhi, 2006
- Drang-bden-gyi-slu-pa’i-slong- mo- ba (A Commentary on the Life and Works of Gendun Choephel), Youtse Publication, Dharamsala, 1999
