= Shauna Macdonald (Scottish actress) =

Scottish actress

- Born: Malaysia
- Education: Royal Scottish Academy of Music and Drama
- Occupation: Actress
- Years active: 1999–present
- Spouse: Cal MacAninch
- Children: 3

Shauna Macdonald is a Scottish actress. She began her career starring in The Debt Collector (1999). She then had her breakthrough starring as Sam Buxton in the television series Spooks (2003–2004). After departing the series, she starred as Sarah Carter in the horror film The Descent (2005), the role for which she is best known. She gained widespread recognition and praise for her performance, and was nominated for the Saturn Award for Best Actress. The film established Macdonald as a scream queen. She reprised her role in its sequel The Descent Part 2 (2009).

Macdonald has continued having starring roles in horror films, portraying Adelaide in Mutant Chronicles (2008), Kate in Howl (2015), Dana in Nails (2017), and Dr. Elle Chrysler in White Chamber (2018), for which she won the Scottish BAFTA Award for Best Actress. She is also known for her roles as Carole Robertson in the film Filth (2013), Agnes Muncie in the television series In Plain Sight (2016), a pilot in Star Wars: The Last Jedi (2017), and as psychiatrist Dr. Wallace in the critically acclaimed miniseries The Cry (2018). She is the voice of Professor Squawkencluck in the 2015 revival of the 80s animated television series Danger Mouse (2015–2019).

Macdonald has been the co-artistic director of Edinburgh Youth Theatre in Bellfield since 2014. She also teaches public speaking classes, through her own company, If In Doubt Shout.

== Early life and education ==
Shauna Macdonald was born in Malaysia while her father was working in the country. At the age of three, she moved back to her family's native Edinburgh in Scotland. As a child, Macdonald was very shy. She had a lisp and went to speech therapy. Her mother made her join a choir group that did musical theatre. Her first role was when she was four years old, portraying a fairy in a church hall in Portobello. She attended Towerbank Primary School in Portobello.

At the age of 12, Macdonald joined the Brunton Youth Theatre in Musselburgh and then the Paisley Youth Theatre in Paisley. It was here that she met and became friends with fellow Scottish actor James McAvoy. At 14, Macdonald landed the lead role in the theatre's production called Earth Crack, where she starred alongside singer and actor David Sneddon and McAvoy. After working as a cleaner for the brother of Ann Coulter, a Scottish talent agent, Coulter signed with Macdonald as her agent. Macdonald attended Portobello High School, where she participated in the school plays.

After graduating from school, she studied acting at the Royal Scottish Academy of Music and Drama in Glasgow, where she was two years below James McAvoy. He later became is a patron of the Edinburgh Youth Theatre, which Macdonald runs.

== Career ==
At the age of 17, Macdonald was cast in and then made her screen debut in the film The Debt Collector (1999), opposite Billy Connolly. While in her second year of university she landed a starring role in The Rocket Post (2004), alongside Kevin McKidd, but the film would take five years after filming to release. In 2000 she made her professional theatre debut in a small role as a waitress in Pal Joey at the Citizens Theatre. She next made appearances in the films Daybreak (2000) and Late Night Shopping (2001) and guest starred in the series Murder Rooms: Mysteries of the Real Sherlock Holmes (2000) and Taggart (2002). In 2002 she also appeared in the play Victory at the Royal Lyceum Theatre.

She first gained some recognition for her main role as Sam Buxton in the television series Spooks (2003–2004). During this time she starred as Catherine in A View From A Bridge (2003) in a co-production of both the Birmingham Repertory Theatre and West Yorkshire Playhouse. She left Spooks after feeling dissatisfied with how her character was developing.

She gained further recognition and critical praise after starring as the lead role Sarah Carter in the horror film The Descent (2005). The film's reception was largely positive from critics and the public alike, appeared on several top ten film lists in 2006, and was a box office success, grossing $57.1 million against a £3.5 million budget. Macdonald's performance in particular was widely praised and she was nominated for the Saturn Award for Best Actress and the Fangoria Chainsaw Award for Chick You Don't Wanna Mess With. The film also established Macdonald as a modern scream queen. The Descent opened in cinemas in the United Kingdom on 8 July 2005. It premiered in the 2006 Sundance Film Festival and released on 4 August 2006 in the United States.

In August 2006 Macdonald appeared in the play Realism at the National Theatre of Scotland. The next year she starred as Rachael in the film Jetsam (2007) and appeared in the television film Wedding Belles (2007). Thereafter she starred as Adelaide in the sci-fi horror film Mutant Chronicles (2008). Macdonald reprised her role as Sarah Carter in the sequel The Descent Part 2 (2009). Unlike the first film, the sequel received generally mixed to negative reviews. In 2011 Macdonald starred as Helen in the film The Hike and returned to the Royal Lyceum Theatre to star as the title character in Mary Queen of Scots Got Her Head Chopped Off (2011). From then she continued making various appearances on radio, television, in film, and theatre. Most notably she returned to the Citizens Theatre to star as Regan in King Lear (2012); in May she starred alongside David Thewlis in the short film Separate We Come, Separate We Go (2012), directed by Bonnie Wright; and in August that year starred as the lead role in Born to Run (2012) at the Traverse Theatre. Her performance in the latter was widely acclaimed.

The next year Macdonald received recognition for starring opposite her friend and former classmate, James McAvoy, as his character's wife, Carole Robertson, in the film Filth (2013). In 2015 Macdonald began voicing the role of Professor Squawkencluck in the animated television series Danger Mouse (2015–present), and returned to the horror genre with the film Howl (2015). In 2016 Macdonald had starring roles as Agnes Muncie in the series In Plain Sight, and as Jodie, a veteran struggling with posttraumatic stress disorder, in the short film Soldier Bee. For her performance in the latter she won the award for Best Actress in an International Short at the Mumbai International Film Festival and was nominated for Best Actress at the Winter Film Awards. She also starred alongside Jeremy Irons and Olga Kurylenko in The Correspondence (2016).

In 2017, Macdonald returned to the horror genre, starring in the film Nails and had a small role as a pilot in Star Wars: The Last Jedi (2017). In 2018 she had a main role as psychiatrist Dr. Wallace in the critically acclaimed miniseries The Cry and starred as Dr. Elle Chrysler in the sci-fi film White Chamber (2018), which premiered at the Edinburgh International Film Festival. For her performance, she won the Scottish BAFTA Award for Best Actress. In 2019 she appeared alongside Laura Harrier in the film Balance, Not Symmetry as Catherine, and had a recurring role as Georgie, the estranged daughter of James Cosmo's character, in the series Hold the Sunset (2019).

From 2019 to early 2020, Macdonald starred as Libby in Mouthpiece at the Traverse Theatre. Macdonald's performance was acclaimed and she won the Stage Edinburgh Award. Macdonald later guest starred in the series Liar (2020) and The Nest (2020), and starred in the short film Consumed (2020).

== Personal life ==
Macdonald is married to Scottish actor Cal MacAninch, whom she met after relocating to London after graduating from college. They have three children together and live in Portobello.

She has been the co-artistic director of Edinburgh Youth Theatre in Bellfield since 2014. Macdonald also teaches public speaking classes with her own company called If In Doubt Shout.

== Theatre ==
| Year | Title | Role | Theatre | Ref. |
|---|---|---|---|---|
| 2000 | Pal Joey | Waitress | Citizens Theatre | |
| 2002 | Victory | Devonshire / Pyle | Lyceum Theatre, Edinburgh | |
| 2003 | A View From A Bridge | Catherine | Birmingham Repertory Theatre / West Yorkshire Playhouse | |
| 2006 | Realism | Girlfriend | National Theatre of Scotland | |
| 2011 | Mary Queen of Scots Got Her Head Chopped Off | Mary | Lyceum Theatre, Edinburgh | |
| 2012 | King Lear | Regan | Citizens Theatre | |
| 2012 | Born to Run | Jane | Traverse Theatre | |
| 2019–2020 | Mouthpiece | Libby | Traverse Theatre | |
| 2024 | Two Sisters | Amy | Lyceum Theatre, Edinburgh | |

== Filmography ==
=== Film ===
| Year | Title | Role | Notes |
|---|---|---|---|
| 1999 | The Debt Collector | Catriona | |
| 2000 | Daybreak | Emily | |
| 2001 | Late Night Shopping | Gail | |
| 2004 | The Rocket Post | Catriona Mackay | |
| 2004 | Niceland | Sandra | |
| 2005 | The Descent | Sarah Carter | |
| 2006 | Chicken Soup | Jess | Short film |
| 2007 | Jetsam | Rachael | |
| 2008 | Mutant Chronicles | Adelaide | |
| 2009 | The Descent Part 2 | Sarah Carter | |
| 2011 | The Hike | Helen | |
| 2012 | Separate We Come, Separate We Go | The Mother | Short film |
| 2013 | Made in Belfast | Alice | |
| 2013 | Filth | Carole Robertson | |
| 2015 | Swung | Hannah | |
| 2015 | Howl | Kate | |
| 2016 | The Correspondence | Victoria | |
| 2016 | Moon Dogs | Ruby | |
| 2016 | Soldier Bee | Jodie | Short film |
| 2017 | Nails | Dana | |
| 2017 | Star Wars: The Last Jedi | Temporary Command Center Resistance Pilot | |
| 2017 | Spitball | Lilly | Short film |
| 2018 | White Chamber | Dr. Elle Chrystler | |
| 2019 | Balance, Not Symmetry | Catherine Hendricks | |
| 2020 | Consumed | Faye | Short film |

=== Television ===
| Year | Title | Role | Notes |
|---|---|---|---|
| 2000 | Murder Rooms: Mysteries of the Real Sherlock Holmes | Heather | Episode: "The Dark Beginnings of Sherlock Holmes: Part 1" |
| 2002 | Taggart | Helen McCabe | Episode: "Hard Man" |
| 2003–2004 | Spooks | Sam Buxton | Main role |
| 2003 | State of Play | Sonia Baker | Recurring role |
| 2006 | Sea of Souls | Rosie Galt | Episode: "The Newsroom" |
| 2007 | Wedding Belles | Rhona | Television film |
| 2008 | Bonekickers | Boudica | Episode: "The Eternal Fire" |
| 2012 | Case Histories | Shirley Manning | Recurring role |
| 2013 | Ripper Street | Martha Fanthorpe | Episode: "A Man of My Company" |
| 2015 | Katie Morag | Mrs. Cavendish | Episode: "Katie Morag and the Worst Day Ever" |
| 2015–2019 | Danger Mouse | Professor Squawkencluck (voice) | Main role |
| 2016 | Murder | Katrina Durridge | Episode: "The Third Voice" |
| 2016 | The Five | Young Julie | Episode: "1.10" |
| 2016 | Halloween Comedy Shorts | Jennifer Bruce | Episode: "Ross Noble's Horror: The Catchment" |
| 2016 | In Plain Sight | Agnes Muncie | Main role |
| 2018 | The Cry | Dr. Wallace | Main role |
| 2019 | Hold the Sunset | Georgie | Recurring role |
| 2020–present | The Scotts | Vonny Scott | Main role |
| 2020 | Liar | Mary Earlham | Episode: "2.4" |
| 2020 | The Nest | Sheena Galvin | Episode: "1.5" |
| 2022 | Outlander | Flora MacDonald | Episode: "6.5" |
| 2022 | Shetland | Rachel Cairns | Recurring role |
| 2022 | Mayflies | Fiona | |

== Radio ==
| Year | Title | Role | Director | Station | Ref. |
|---|---|---|---|---|---|
| 2004 | Soft Fall the Sounds of Eden | Vari | Gaynor Macfarlane | BBC Radio 4 Friday Play | |
| 2011 | Rightfully Mine | Amy | Lu Kemp | BBC Radio 4 Afternoon Play | |
| 2012 | The Black Book | Nell & Marie | Bruce Young | BBC Radio 4 Classic Serial | |
| 2017 | Transformations | Narrator | Kirsty Williams | BBC Radio 4 | |
| 2018 | 4/4 | Skye | Gaynor Macfarlane | BBC Radio 4 Afternoon Drama | |
| 2018 | (After) Fear | Ishbel | Kirsty Williams | BBC Radio 3 Drama on 3 | |
| 2018 | When The Pips Stop | Older Sister | Kirsty Williams | BBC Radio 4 Afternoon Drama | |

== Awards and nominations ==
| Year | Award | Category | Work | Result | Ref. |
|---|---|---|---|---|---|
| 2006 | Fangoria Chainsaw Awards | Chick You Don't Wanna Mess With (Best Heroine) | The Descent | Nominated | |
| 2007 | Saturn Awards | Best Actress | The Descent | Nominated | |
| 2016 | Mumbai International Film Festival | Best Actress, International Short | Soldier Bee | Won | |
| 2018 | BAFTA Awards Scotland | Best Actress - Film | White Chamber | Won | |
