= Danny Stack =

Irish screenwriter and film director

- Occupations: Screenwriter, director
- Known for: Who Killed Nelson Nutmeg?, Hey Duggee

Danny Stack is an Irish screenwriter and film director, with credits in children's television, indie films and TV movies. Alongside Tim Clague, he made the live-action family films Who Killed Nelson Nutmeg?, Future TX and the TV series Dog Years. Danny and Tim created and co-hosted The UK Scriptwriters Podcast, a regular series of interviews with prominent writers and producers in UK film and television, as well as advice for getting into the industry.

== Career ==
After working as a special effects assistant and then a film critic for JMTV, Stack moved to England and began working for Channel 4's Entertainment department. He also worked as a freelance script reader for Miramax, Working Title and Pathe. In 2004, Stack won the BBCNI Tony Doyle Bursary Award for New Writing. He gained his first writing credit on The Amazing Adrenalini Brothers, followed by Doctors and EastEnders. He subsequently moved into children's television, writing for series such as Hey Duggee, Thunderbirds Are Go, PJ Masks, Octonauts and Transformers: Rescue Bots Academy. His first short film (that he wrote, produced & directed), the supernatural thriller Origin, won Best Horror Short at the London Independent Film Festival.

Stack helped set up the Red Planet Prize, a screenwriting award run by Red Planet Pictures, the production company of Tony Jordan. One of the winners was Robert Thorogood, whose script became Death in Paradise.

With Tim Clague, Stack founded Nelson Nutmeg Pictures, a production company focusing on independent films and television projects. Their first feature was Who Killed Nelson Nutmeg?, starring Bonnie Wright. The film premiered on 10 October 2015 at the 59th BFI London Film Festival. In 2020, the pair released their preschool series, Dog Years, on kidoodle.tv, a family-friendly streaming service.

Their next film, a science-fiction children's feature titled Future TX, premiered at the Cinemagic Festival in Belfast on 15 October 2022, with a limited theatrical after. In 2023, it was announced Stack and Clague were developing a new animated series, Buddybots, for Creation Entertainment Media and Magic Frame Animation. Stack and Clague are also developing an animated feature for Creation, a children's comedy titled Aliens F.C..

In April 2023, RTE aired a new children's animated series, Flix, based on the books by Tomi Ungerer. Stack was head writer of the series. Also in 2023, Stack and Clague were hired to direct a number of romance dramedies for Reel One Entertainment including To England With Love starring Georgia Hirst, and A Very English Christmas starring Kimberley Nixon. They collaborated again with Nixon on the play Baby Brain, which began touring in 2026.

== Teaching ==
Stack has lectured on screenwriting. In addition, he co-authored two guide books with Clague, The UK Scriptwriters Survival Handbook: or How to Earn an Actual Living as a Writer in 2015, followed by Write a Script in 10 Weeks in 2017.

== Filmography ==
=== Television ===
| Production | Episodes | Broadcaster/Distributor |
|---|---|---|
| The Amazing Adrenalini Brothers | 1 episode (2006) | CITV |
| Doctors | 2 episodes (2006) | BBC One |
| Sofia’s Diary | Staff writer (2008) | Channel 5 |
| Roy | 1 episode (2009) | CBBC |
| EastEnders | 2 episodes (2009) | BBC One |
| Octonauts | 15 episodes (2012–2013) | Cbeebies |
| Rocka-Bye Island | 2 episodes (2014) | Monster Entertainment |
| Hey Duggee | Staff writer (2015) | Cbeebies |
| Thunderbirds Are Go | 1 episode (2015) | Citv |
| The Hive | 2 episodes (2015) | Disney |
| Zack & Quack | 1 episode (2016) | Nick Jr. |
| Brewster the Rooster | 3 episodes (2017) | RTÉ |
| Olobob Top | 6 episodes (2017–2018) | Monster Entertainment |
| PJ Masks | 7 episodes (2018–2020) | Disney |
| Transformers: Rescue Bots Academy | 6 episodes (2019–2020) | Discovery Kids |
| Rhyme Time Town | 1 episode (2020) | Netflix |
| Dog Years | Web series. Creator, director, writer, producer (2020) | Kidoodle.TV |
| Alva's World | 2 episodes (2021) | RTÉjr |
| Tales from Dún Draíochta | 1 episode (2022) | RTÉ |
| Big Tree City | 1 episode (2022) | Netflix |
| Flix | Head writer (2023–present) | RTÉ |
| Tulipop Tales | 4 episodes (2023-2024) | - |
| Pop Paper City | 1 episode (2023) | Aardman |
| Silly Sundays | 1 episode (2024) | |
| Holt | 12 episodes (2025) | |
| Buddybotzzz | Writer (2026) | |

=== Film ===
| Production | Episodes | Broadcaster/Distributor |
|---|---|---|
| Who Killed Nelson Nutmeg? | Director, Writer, Producer (2015) | Evolutionary Films |
| Future TX | Director, writer, producer (2022) | Templeheart Films |
| To England, with Love | Director, producer (2023) | Reel One Entertainment |
| A Very English Christmas | Director, producer (2023) | Paramount+ |
| A Merry Royal Christmas | Director, producer (2024) | Reel One Entertainment |
