= In Plain Sight (British TV series) =

- DVD cover
- Also known as: Muncie (working title)
- Genre: Drama
- Based on: The Peter Manuel case
- Written by: Nick Stevens
- Directed by: John Strickland
- Starring: Martin Compston; Douglas Henshall; Brian McCardie; Denis Lawson; Shauna Macdonald; Joanna Roth; Gary Lewis
- Composer: Nina Humphreys
- Country of origin: Scotland
- Original language: English
- No. of series: 1
- No. of episodes: 3

Production
- Executive producers: Richard McNeill; Roderick Seligman; Natalie Usher; Robbie Allan
- Producer: Gillian McNeill
- Production location: Scotland
- Editor: Andrew John McLelland
- Camera setup: Ruari O'Brien
- Running time: 60 minutes (inc. adverts)
- Production companies: World Productions; Finlaggan Films; ITV Studios

Original release
- Network: ITV
- Release: 7 December – 21 December 2016

In Plain Sight is a Scottish television drama series covering the crimes committed by serial killer Peter Manuel in Lanarkshire, Scotland in the 1950s. The three-part series was first broadcast on ITV on 7 December 2016. The series is distributed worldwide by BBC Worldwide.

== Plot ==
The plot revolves around serial killer Peter Manuel, who killed at least eight people between 1956 and 1958 in Lanarkshire, and the detective who pursued him to his conviction, William Muncie. Manuel, who was born in the United States, was known as "The Beast of Birkenshaw" (as he lived in Birkenshaw, Uddingston). He taunted his pursuer with messages and even sent him birthday and Christmas cards.

At the time, local police had never dealt with this level of criminality before; Manuel chose his victims at random, with no apparent reason and ended up scaring a whole community so much that locals started locking their doors.

The series follows the destructive trail that Manuel left and shows him revelling in his cockiness with the police and his victims, even going so far as representing himself in his criminal trials.

== Cast ==
- Douglas Henshall as William Muncie
- Martin Compston as Peter Manuel
- James Harkness as Joe Brannan
- Sorcha Groundsell as Jane Muncie
- Shauna Macdonald as Agnes Muncie
- Kate McLaughlin as Sandra Muncie
- Joanne Thomson as Iris Laird
- Gavin Jon Wright as Hugh Kirk
- Jack Greenlees as DS McLeod
- Jenny Hulse as Mary McLauchlan
- Lousie McCarthy as Babs
- Stewart Porter as John Buchanan
- Gilly Gilchrist as Sammy Manuel
- Joanna Roth as Bridget Manuel
- Bobby Rainsbury as Theresa Manuel
- Michael Nardone as Det Supt Leish
- Gary Lewis as William Watt

== Production ==
Many locations across Glasgow (including the Victoria Infirmary) and the Central Belt of Scotland were used in filming. Some parts were even filmed in Compston's home town of Greenock. Dunlop in East Ayrshire was also used for the home of the detective Muncie and the police station (outside entrance). Albion Automotive disused office in Scotstoun was used for scenes in the inside of the police station.

Culture Secretary, Fiona Hyslop, confirmed that the Scottish Government would be contributing £250,000 towards the production. She announced this on the opening day at the Edinburgh International Film Festival in June 2016.

Both Compston and Henshall spent time researching their parts and the characters they would be playing. Compston admitted to being scared stiff in one scene and said that he had driven around to Manuel's old house after filming and parked up, "just to sit outside". Henshall talked about his part with William Muncie's daughter and was determined to bring the character to life, who, by Henshall's estimation, was single-minded in catching Manuel but also the only one who took to the notion of him being a serial killer.

The production caused controversy amongst the relatives of some of the victims. The production team tried to contact everyone, but Stuart and David Reid, whose two aunts, Marianne Watt and Margaret Brown and cousin, Vivienne (daughter of Marianne Watt) were killed by Manuel in 1956, could not be found. The brothers have said that the production would re-open old wounds. They contacted the production team who listened to their comments, but the brothers claim it was to no avail; “We asked ITV to scrap it. The producers did listen to what we had to say but by this point it was too little, too late. It was obvious they had no intention of pulling the plug.”
