= The Moment of Truth (play) =

1951 satirical play

- The Moment of Truth London 2013 Poster
- Original language: English
- Written by: Peter Ustinov
- Characters: The Girl; The General; The Victor; The Foreign Minister; The Prime Minister; The Marshal; The Nurse; The Photographer
- Subject: The mechanics of toppling governments, the pretenses of war and the power of propaganda.
- Genre: Satire, drama, comedy
- Setting: The era of World War II, inside the cabinet office and latter a desolate prison.

Premiere
- Date: 1951
- Place: Adelphi Theatre
- Official website

The Moment of Truth is a satire comedy drama play by Peter Ustinov written in 1951, telling the story of a Republic on the brink of defeat, while facing the threat of a political crisis with a crippled government structure.

Ustinov wrote the play inspired by French President Marshal Petain, his political relationship with Nazi Germany and the events surrounding the creation of Vichy France. The play was first premiered at the Adelphi Theatre, Adelphi in 1951. The play was revived in 2013 at the Southwark Playhouse in Newington Causeway, London by The New Actors Company. The production was directed by Rob Laycock, and opened on 26 June 2013 and closed on 20 July 2013 after 26 performances.

== Plot summary ==
Act One

The play opens with the anonymous Prime Minister, his Foreign Minister and General inside the cabinet office, their country on the verge of defeat as they wait for the Victor to arrive to accept their surrender. When the Victor arrives, instead of surrendering to him, they negotiate a deal to form a puppet government, where both the Prime Minister and Foreign Minister remain in power. To give legitimacy to this new government, the Prime Minister and his co-conspirators use a highly revered military hero, the retired Marshal, as the dictator of the country behind which they hide and use him as a puppet.

Act Two

Four years later, the General overthrows the Marshal and his puppet government, eventually liberating the Republic from foreign rule. Following a brief trial, the Marshal is sent to a remote prison. His daughter (The Girl), a Nurse and a Photographer stand by him.

== Characters ==
The Marshal
An older, retired military hero who is mostly senile due to his mental condition. He often provides the comic relief in the story.
The Prime Minister
Also an older man, who has memory problems due to his advanced age. He uses the Marshal to keep himself in power.
The General
The head of the Republic's armed forces, he later overthrows the puppet dictatorship and liberates the country.
The Girl
Daughter of the Marshal. Unlike all the other characters, she is only one who is named. She has 13 different names including Beatrice and Cordelia.
The Victor
The leader of the enemy country hostile to the Republic. He later agrees to the Prime Minister's plan for a puppet government.
The Photographer
He captures the daily life moments of Marshal, which can be later used by the press whatever way they want.
The Nurse
She takes care of Marshal. She stands by him even during his imprisonment.
The Foreign Minister
The co-conspirator of the Prime Minister who helped form the plan to use the Marshal as their puppet dictator.

== Revival ==
In June 2013, the play was revived by The New Actors Company and performed at the Southwark Playhouse in Newington Causeway, London.

=== Cast of 2013 Revival ===
- Rodney Bewes - The Marshal
- Miles Richardson - The Prime Minister
- Bonnie Wright - The Girl
- Callum Coates - The General
- Damian Quinn - The Victor
- Mark Carey - The Foreign Minister
- Toni Kanal - The Nurse
- Daniel Souter - The Photographer

== Film adaptation ==
The play was adapted as a TV film for the Sunday Night Theatre, a long-running series of televised plays created by BBC and aired on 6 March 1955. Peter Ustinov himself played the role of The Marshal while rest of the characters were played by Peter Cushing as The Prime Minister, Jeanette Sterke as The Girl, Walter Rilla as The Victor, Donald Pleasence as The Foreign Minister, Hugh Griffith as The Photographer, Ian Colin as The General and Noel Hood as The Nurse.
