= Hold the Sunset =

BBC television sitcom

- Genre: Sitcom
- Written by: Charles McKeown
- Directed by: Sandy Johnson
- Starring: John Cleese; Alison Steadman; Jason Watkins; Rosie Cavaliero; Peter Egan; Anne Reid; Joanna Scanlan; James Cosmo; Sue Johnston; Shauna Macdonald
- Opening theme: "Have I the Right?" by the Honeycombs
- Country of origin: United Kingdom
- Original language: English
- No. of series: 2
- No. of episodes: 13

Production
- Executive producer: Chris Sussman
- Producers: Humphrey Barclay; Moira Williams
- Running time: 30 minutes
- Production company: BBC Studios

Original release
- Network: BBC One
- Release: 18 February 2018 – 6 September 2019

Hold the Sunset is a British television sitcom first broadcast on BBC One on 18 February 2018. When first announced, it had the working title Edith.

== Premise ==
The plot revolves around two retired neighbours, Phil (Cleese) and Edith (Steadman), who live in Stoke Poges, Buckinghamshire (although filming is largely in and around Richmond, London). They are both widowed and planning to start a new life together in Gozo. Those plans are scuppered when Edith's 49-year-old son Roger (Watkins), moves back into his mother's house after walking out on his wife and their two teenage children.

== Cast ==
- Alison Steadman – Edith
- John Cleese – Phil, Edith's boyfriend
- Jason Watkins – Roger, Edith's son
- Rosie Cavaliero – Wendy, Roger's wife
- Joanna Scanlan – Sandra, Edith's daughter
- Anne Reid – Queenie, Edith's cleaner
- James Cosmo – Bob, Edith's ex-boyfriend
- Peter Egan – Jack Dugdale, neighbour, a retired doctor
- Sue Johnston – Joan, Edith's sister
- Shauna Macdonald – Georgie, Bob's estranged daughter

== Home media ==
The first series was released on 26 March 2018.

== Reception ==
The series has received mixed reviews with 56% on Rotten Tomatoes. Criticism was particularly aimed at the series' dated plot and gags, and Roger's unlikeability.

== Episodes ==
=== Series 1 (2018) ===
Episode 1: Bubbly: 18 February

Edith is a 69-year-old retired widow who lives on her own in a semi-detached house in middle-class Stoke Poges. Her boyfriend Phil is a widower who lives on his own across the road; his wife Celia died eight years ago. Phil tries to persuade her to marry, each sell their houses and move to a warm climate together. Edith's immature 49-year-old son Roger unexpectedly arrives with his bags, delighted in telling her that he has left his unpleasant wife Wendy after 19 unhappy years with her. He also says how happy he is to have left his twin teenage children Jason and Jennifer, as well as his job at the bank. He is horrified when Edith tells him that his father disposed of many of his possessions years ago, which Roger believes were valuable. Edith and Phil are annoyed at Roger's return and his childish behaviour. He plans to visit their neighbour Annie, with whom he was friends when they were children - believing that they should be a couple. Edith informs him that she emigrated to Canada years ago. Wendy arrives and Roger hides in the shed, then becomes stuck whilst trying to climb through a window in the house. Wendy confronts Roger as he is stuck, then Edith tells her to leave as Edith frees him from the window.

The episode achieved 7.19 million viewers.

Episode 2: Birthday: 25 February

Edith's daughter Sandra visits for Edith's 70th birthday and suggests that Edith sell her house and move in with her. Sandra also asks her for £50,000 to help with her businesses. Roger tells Phil that Phil's ex-stalker Desiree, is back in the area, driving a delivery van. Phil tells Roger to go back to Wendy and informs him that he and Edith are planning to move to Gozo. Edith is horrified at Roger hiring Queenie Gale, whom Edith disliked when she did housework for Edith decades ago. Roger suggests to Edith that he continue to live in the house and that she not sell it. Phil supports Roger's proposal, because Roger will otherwise order a delivery from Desiree's company, bringing her to the house. Wendy arrives, angry that Roger has sold their car.

The episode achieved 5.53 million viewers.

Episode 3: The Marriage Counsellor: 4 March

Mrs Gale tells Edith that she was a marriage counsellor in Tasmania and can help repair Roger and Wendy's marriage. Edith opposes that, and Wendy is intending to divorce Roger. However, Mrs Gale separately pressures the couple to reunite. They do so briefly, but shortly after during a party Wendy cannot bear Roger's childishness and phones Phil to tell him that the reconciliation is off and that she does not want to see Mrs Gale again. Edith and Phil go on a seaside weekend break together.

The episode achieved 5.96 million viewers.

Episode 4: The Burglary: 11 March

Wendy visits to tell Edith that Roger let the mortgage go into arrears. She also tells Edith of a dream she had in which she killed him. Phil walks along the street, where he encounters neighbour Mr Dugdale, who informs him of the recent death of his dog Wellington, which Phil tells Edith and Wendy of. Roger tells Edith that he never wanted Wendy and that he only married her to be in an advantageous position to leave her for her sister Rose, when Rose became single. His plan failed and he was stuck with Wendy. At night, a one-armed burglar, Bob Whitley, breaks into the house and plays (I Can't Get No) Satisfaction very loudly. Edith comes downstairs and recognises him because they went out together for a few weeks in 1962. Roger comes downstairs. Phil, Wendy, the police and Mrs Gale arrive separately. The police ignore Bob and instead take Roger and Wendy with them because the car which Roger recently bought for Wendy to replace the one he sold is stolen.

The episode achieved 4.47 million viewers.

Episode 5: Roger the Carer: 18 March

Phil lends Sandra £30,000, which Roger and Edith disagree with. Bob persuades Roger to register as Edith's carer in order to receive Carer's Allowance from the government, despite her being in good health and not needing care. After talking to staff at the benefits office - during which he falsely claims that she is seriously disabled - they tell him that they need to meet Edith at the house. Roger tells Sandra that Edith and Phil want their hair cut at her salon at the time when Felicity (Alexandra Roach) from the Benefits Agency will be visiting. Roger tricks Mrs Gale into pretending to be Edith and that she is disabled. When Edith and Phil arrive at the salon, they think that Sandra wanted the appointments to be at that time. Sandra suspects that Roger is doing something wrong and goes to the house. Roger involves Sandra, who phones Phil to help with the deception and her plan to make it seem like Roger is insane. Felicity is confused and leaves in a stressed state. Roger tells Bob that their plan failed.

The episode achieved 4.06m viewers.

Episode 6: Old Flames: 25 March

Phil encounters Mr Dugdale, then Bob - whilst walking along the street. Bob is wearing a prosthetic arm and indicates to Phil that he is still attracted to Edith. Sandra visits, but leaves without talking to Roger. Roger tells Edith that he made an unsuccessful attempt to claim Carer's Allowance for looking after her. He flies his new drone in the back garden and quickly loses it. Bob finds it and brings it back to Roger. Phil answers the door to Desiree (Shobna Gulati), whom he had not seen for six years, to deliver a package for Roger. Mrs Gale tells Roger that she has won £2,000 on the National Lottery, but has lost the ticket. Desiree faints in the street and is brought into the house by Bob. Desiree finds the ticket in a magazine in the house while bonding with Edith. Phil threatens Bob, and tells him to stay away. Having cashed in the ticket Desiree found, Mrs Gale brings home a Chinese takeaway for everyone in the house - including Wendy (whom she invited), Sandra, Desiree and Bob. Phil tells Wendy that he has instructed an estate agent to put his house on the market.

The episode achieved 4.15 million viewers.

Christmas Special: If I Were a Wise Man: 23 December

Edith plans one last Christmas with the family before she and Phil embark on their sunset journey, and Phil's anxiety about not selling his house leads him to a spooky encounter.

=== Series 2 (2019) ===
Episode 1: The Sale: 2 August

With their sunset retirement together waiting on the sale of his house, Phil despairs of finding the right estate agent. The current one, Roland Percy, suggests an open day, but Phil baulks at the idea. Edith, meanwhile, is heartened to find that her son Roger is earning some sort of a living even if it is only busking with her old flame Bob the Burglar, and performing a ventriloquist act with his stuffed toy crocodile Methuselah. Sandra is becoming impatient with Roger's ex-wife Wendy's need for company and steers her to the local community centre where she suggests she may find something to keep her busy. Queenie confesses to Edith that she cannot bear the thought of her going away, and when she hears that plans are currently stalled by the difficulty of selling Phil's house, she sees her chance to influence events. She recruits Sandra to help talk Phil into having an Open Day after all. Jack Dugdale, walking his St Bernard dog Bertie, stops for one of his usual chats with Phil and hears the latest on his plans for his and Edith's future. They discuss Roger's well-being, and Dugdale wonders if being left in charge of Edith's house might be the making of him. Roger and Bob take their busking to the naked ladies fountain at York House, but the police chase them away and Bob collapses. Dugdale, a retired medic, comes to the rescue, and calls an ambulance. Phil gives in to the general persuasion that he should hold an open day, and Queenie makes sure he will personally attend and persuades Roger that some entertainment would not go amiss. Wendy explores possibilities at the community centre and takes to the creative writing class. When viewers arrive at Phil's house they find Roger busking off-puttingly on the doorstep and, as they treat themselves to Sandra's lavish hospitality, Queenie plants rumours about damp and evil spirits. Edith and Phil turn up to find his house invaded by doubtfully gossiping freeloaders, the estate agent happily over-indulging on free wine, and Roger cavorting in a rabbit costume. Phil shouts at the viewers, who then leave. Later Edith, Sandra and Queenie are all laughing about the disastrous day when suddenly they realise Phil has disappeared.

Episode 2: The Disappearance: 9 August

Phil's house has been withdrawn from the market by his estate agent, who thinks he is insane, and he has not turned up for his regular morning meeting with Edith. As she and Sandra hurry to Phil's house, Edith receives a phone call from her sister Joan inviting herself to stay. Meanwhile, Roger is visiting Bob in hospital. He tells Bob that he has thought of a new way to make money and has let his mother's spare room, online, to two Americans. Bob's estranged goth daughter Georgie arrives from Glasgow to see how he is, and Roger takes a shine to her. As she has nowhere to stay, he offers her his room. Then, as he is making up the sofa for himself in the sitting room, Joan arrives demanding the spare room. Edith returns home to find her house full of unexpected guests and her demanding sister. Dugdale finds Phil, who is admitted to hospital, before walking out and going home.

Episode 3: Aunty Joan: 16 August

Phil discusses his ongoing house sale difficulties with Dugdale, who is glad that he has recovered after last week's disappearance and says he might be interested in buying the house. Phil imparts this good news to Edith, along with the bad news that a surveyor has found dry rot. Edith's sister Joan joins them and it is clear that she and Phil get along no better than she and Edith. Joan advises Edith against moving to Gozo with Phil. Joan frequently promises people bequests in her will. Roger visits Bob at his temporary digs, a caravan by the river, and tells Bob about Phil's dry rot. Bob persuades him that this is the sort of thing surveyors make up, and they should inspect it themselves. But as Roger and Bob explore the attic, Phil arrives with prospective buyer Dugdale in tow. During the viewing, Roger falls halfway through the ceiling of the master bedroom. Phil tells Edith about the accident.

Episode 4: The Lemming Family: 23 August

Edith and Phil discover a local bookshop hosting a local author, Wendy Stevens, who is signing her first book, The Lemming Family, which is for children. Thrilled that Wendy's writing ambitions have come to fruition, Edith steers Phil into the shop to congratulates her, but Wendy seems alarmed at the prospect of Phil reading the book. Over a coffee immediately afterwards, Edith and Phil are outraged to find out that the characters in the book are thinly disguised portrayals of themselves and the family. Roger continues to busk by the riverside with Bob, and is horrified to spot among the crowd a familiar face: Mrs Pool, the woman from social services, with whom Roger had a run-in when he fraudulently applied to be a paid carer for his mother, impersonated by Queenie. Roger is hopeful that he has another opportunity to be paid carer. However, him being pleased at his application for carer being accepted turns to being horrified when he finds out that it is demanding Joan whom he will be caring for, at her house.

Episode 5: Damage Limitation: 30 August

With her annoying sister Joan safely packed off home, Edith is thrilled when Phil announces that Jack Dugdale has made an offer on his house, which he has accepted. Edith and Phil's next step is to marry. Roger has been ditched by Joan as her carer. He, Bob and Georgie are hired as children's entertainers for a seven-year-old's birthday party, which goes badly. While out jogging, Dugdale astonishes Sandra by proposing to her, which she accepts. The Lemming Family is becoming increasingly popular and has won a literary award, which is affecting all the family as well as Bob and Queenie, who are all thinly disguised as characters in it. Phil calls a meeting to prepare for a showdown with Wendy. When she arrives with her literary agent Terry, she tells Roger that due to her improved financial situation, she no longer needs alimony from him, which he is pleased with. He proposes to her, which she rejects, telling him and his family that she is engaged to Terry. Roger uses Methuselah to tell Georgie that he is attracted to her, but she makes it clear that the feeling is not mutual, before walking away from him.

Episode 6: Doing A Bunk: 6 September

Removal men are busy at Phil's house after its sale to Jack Dugdale. Dugdale is now engaged to Edith's daughter, Sandra, and the two prospective grooms discuss their respective plans. Georgie, an art student, has started making a video about Roger and his fixation on his crocodile puppet Methuselah, but decides she cannot make a successful project of it, so Roger suggests she make a video of Phil and Edith's wedding instead. Roger tells Edith he will miss her and her biscuits, and that he is in love with Georgie. Bob interrupts the wedding to say that Edith should be with him. The wedding continues despite the interruption, after which the newlywed couple travel by motorhome to Portugal, where a Portuguese-speaking woman recognises them as characters in The Lemming Family.
