= After the Dark =

2013 film directed by John Huddles

- Theatrical release poster
- Directed by: John Huddles
- Screenplay by: John Huddles
- Produced by: George Zakk; Cybill Lui; John Huddles
- Starring: James D'Arcy; Cinta Laura Kiehl; Sophie Lowe; Daryl Sabara; Freddie Stroma; Rhys Wakefield; Bonnie Wright
- Cinematography: John Radel
- Edited by: William Yeh
- Music by: Jonathan Davis; Nicholas O'Toole
- Production companies: An Olive Branch Productions; SCTV
- Distributed by: Phase 4 Films; All Media Company
- Release dates: 7 July 2013 (NIFFF); 7 February 2014 (United States)
- Running time: 107 minutes
- Countries: Indonesia; United States
- Language: English

After the Dark (also titled The Philosophers outside the U.S.) is a science fiction psychological thriller film written and directed by John Huddles. It stars Sophie Lowe, Rhys Wakefield, Bonnie Wright, James D'Arcy, Daryl Sabara, and Freddie Stroma. The film premiered in competition at Neuchâtel International Fantastic Film Festival on 7 July 2013. The film was nominated for “Best Motion Picture” in 2013 at the world's top fantasy film festival (The Sitges Film Festival, or Festival Internacional de Cinema Fantàstic de Catalunya). The film also premiered at Fantasy Filmfest on 21 August 2013. The film was released on February 7, 2014, in the United States.

== Plot ==
Mr. Zimit, a philosophy teacher at an international school in Jakarta, has been challenging his class of twenty with thought exercises to prepare them for their future. On the last day of school, he holds an exercise in which he posits an oncoming atomic apocalypse. There is a bunker to shelter them for a year, but it only has supplies for ten people, so his students have to decide who of them should be allowed in. The top student, Petra, initially refuses to participate, but Zimit threatens to lower her boyfriend James' academic score if she does not.

Zimit distributes cards that contain a detail about the students' characters in the exercise: James is an organic farmer and Petra is an engineer. The students defend their right to enter the shelter, then there's a group vote after discussion. Students with skills judged useful for survival are allowed in, such as James and Petra, while those who don't are refused, such as Beatrice, a fashion designer. Zimit is part of the exercise but his skills are hidden. At first the students agree to let him in, but Zimit executes the students who have been rejected, claiming that it is more humane than letting them die by radiation. The remaining students race into the bunker before the explosion, locking out Zimit. Outside, Zimit holds up a card saying that only he has the exit code. After living out the year in the bunker, the survivors discover that the exit code is necessary. All attempts of breaking out of the bunker are futile, and after supplies run out they commit group suicide.

They decide to try the exercise again. The cards given earlier are revealed to contain a secondary detail that change the votes, e.g. Georgina, who was allowed in earlier because of her status as a surgeon, now has possibly contracted the Ebola virus and is rejected. Petra and James are still voted in despite James' additional character detail of being gay. Zimit and the chosen students enter the bunker, and agree to start procreating immediately. Various heterosexual pairs get together, but as James is gay in this exercise, Petra has to have sex with Zimit. After ten weeks there are no pregnancies, and Zimit argues that they need to change partners. When Bonnie, a soldier with eidetic memory, refuses, Zimit threatens her with a gun. Jack stabs Zimit, who responds by opening the doors and killing everyone. James questions Zimit's motives for the exercise, asking why he seems intent on punishing them. After checking the box with the cards, James discovers that his and Petra's cards were fixed. Zimit claims the exercise is meant to have James be confronted with how his privilege has made him ill-prepared for the real world, but James does not believe him.

Petra insists the exercise be carried out a third time, and asks everyone to trust her to choose who gets to enter the bunker. She picks people who are a potential risk or have non-technical skills, including an opera singer and poet, which angers Zimit. Petra herself refuses to enter the bunker, but is pushed inside when Chips switches places with her before the door closes. Zimit is outright refused entry since his exit code is no longer necessary—Bonnie remembers it from the previous iteration. Petra continues the thought exercise, explaining that the year in the bunker was enjoyable and filled with creativity. When they leave, they discover that the bombs never fell. Zimit narrates that they will die, as none of them have the technical skills to survive, but Petra counters that they will live the rest of their short lives well and welcome death when it arrives.

Zimit arrives at the beach, having survived in a cave for the past year, and threatens to shoot James, but the rest of the survivors stand in front of him.

Back in class, Zimit is discomfited by the latest exercise. At the end of the session, everyone leaves except Petra, who accuses Zimit of trying to use the exercise to punish her and James. Zimit has been having an affair with Petra, and he believes James is beneath her. Petra argues that intelligence isn't all that matters. The film ends with Zimit alone in the school, where he reaches for a pistol in his drawer, and a gunshot is heard. However, like the scenarios posited by Zimit earlier in the film, the same scene is shown with multiple outcomes, reflecting the hypothetical outcomes of the previous experiments.

== Cast ==
- Sophie Lowe as Petra, the best student in the class who tries to save everybody in each trial. She is cast as a structural engineer in the first round and is saved. In the second round, she is also an electrical engineer and is saved again. She picks who to save in the third round and does not save herself, but she is pulled into the bunker by the others.
- Rhys Wakefield as James, Petra's boyfriend. He is given the role of an organic farmer and saved in the first round because of his ability to grow food. In the second round, he has the added characteristic of being gay, thus having difficulty in helping to repopulate, but is still saved again. In the third round, he is changed from an organic farmer to a florist, but is still saved by Petra.
- James D'Arcy as Eric Zimit, who identifies himself as a 'wild card'. In the first round, he is the last person saved; however, when he shot those who would be left for dead (as he believes it to be more merciful than letting them die of radiation), the group turns on him and locks him out of the bunker. It is revealed Mr. Zimit is a bunker builder and the only person to know the exit code to leave the bunker after the year is up. He is saved in the second round, but opens the door early and kills everyone inside after a fight. He is not saved in the third round, but hides in a cave on the island and survives on his own, hoping to kill those in the bunker for betraying him.
- Bonnie Wright as Georgina. She is given the occupation as an orthopedic surgeon who is immediately voted in for the first trial because of her medical skills. However, in the second round, her additional characteristic is that she was recently exposed to the ebola virus and could infect the bunker if she has it. She is not saved in the second round. Georgina is saved by Petra in the third trial.
- Daryl Sabara as Chips. Chips is a carpenter who is saved for the first round. In the second round, he reveals that he is infertile and cannot contribute to rebuilding the population, but is still saved again. In the third round, Bonnie refuses to be saved, so Chip takes her place in the bunker. However, when Petra refuses to enter, Chips tricks her into taking his spot by pulling her into the bunker and runs out, sacrificing himself for her. According to Chips, he and the others who would not be saved escape on a boat and find an island to live safely.
- Freddie Stroma as Jack. Jack is given a PhD in chemistry and is saved in the first trial. In the second trial, he has the additional characteristic of 'winning the genetic lotto', he is at risk for no disease and will live long and healthy, making him a desired contributor to the gene pool. He is saved again. In the third trial, Petra saves Jack, who is gay outside of the simulation, in order to preserve diversity. When Jack asks for another gay male to join them so he has someone to be with, Petra saves Parker, who is also gay outside of the simulation.
- Katie Findlay as Bonnie. She is given the role as a soldier and is saved. In the second trial, she is given the additional characteristic of having an eidetic memory, she is saved again. Petra tries to save her in the third round, but Bonnie argues that Petra is more valuable to the group than she is and refuses to be saved. However, because of her eidetic memory and watching Mr. Zimit input the exit code in the second round, she saves the group by giving them the code before they shut the bunker.
- George Blagden as Andy. He is cast as an electrician and is saved in the first round, but he 'dies' from a brain aneurysm caused by mental anguish, and is eaten by the others after they run out of food. In the second round, he also has fibrodysplasia ossificans progressiva, a connective tissue disease that renders him useless after small injuries. He is not saved the second time, nor a third time.
- Erin Moriarty as Vivian. She is given the role as a zoologist and is not saved in the first round. After it is revealed she runs a blog for PETA, she is not saved in the second or third rounds.
- Maia Mitchell as Beatrice. She is given the role of a fashion designer and is not saved in the first trial. In the second trial, it is revealed she created a popular brand of women's clothing out of bamboo. She is not saved again. Beatrice is saved in the third round when Petra justifies that dressing well boosts self-esteem, which promotes productivity, which could save civilization.
- Jacob Artist as Parker, who is cast as a gelato maker. He is not saved in the first round. Due to a misprint on his card where he has no additional trait, Parker is not saved in the second round either. Because Parker is actually gay, he is saved for Jack in the third round.
- Cinta Laura as Utami. She is an opera singer. Petra vouches for her, saying that music is vital for entertainment and relaxation; however, Utami and Mr. Zimit are the last people to be voted on and she loses to him. In the second round, she is given two additional characteristics: she speaks 7 languages, which Petra argues they will need to communicate with other survivors around the world, but will develop throat cancer and lose her voice. Utami is not saved in the second round, but she is saved in the third when Petra says they should have music while they can.
- Philippa Coulthard as Poppie, given the role of a psychotherapist, saved in the first round because of the trauma caused by an apocalypse. In the second round, it is revealed she had a hysterectomy and can not bear children; she is not saved in the second or third rounds.
- Hope Olaide Wilson as Omosedé, who is cast as a United States Senator. She is saved in the first round because her occupation would give her negotiation and leadership skills. In the second round, it is revealed she would have been the first female chief justice of the supreme court, she is saved again, but she is not saved in the third round.
- Abhi Sinha as Kavi. He is given the role of a real estate agent who is not saved in the first round. In the second round, he is also a midwife. After losing Georgina as their doctor, this saves him in the second round. He is not saved in the last round.
- Toby Sebastian as Russell, who is cast as a harp player and not saved during the first trial. In the second trial, he is revealed to have autism. Again, he is not saved. In the third round, Petra argues autism is a gift and saves Russell.
- Melissa Le-Vu as Plum. She is a hedge-fund manager who is not saved during the first round. In the second round, it is revealed she carries a bag of jewels with her everywhere. Because she has a currency that will not lose its value and she is also a girl, thus, she can bear children, she is saved in the second round, but not in the third.
- Darius Homayoun as Toby. He is given the role as a published poet and is shot immediately by Mr. Zimit in both the first trial (Mr. Zimit says a published poet will be of no use to them) and second trial (to prevent Toby from taking his spot in the bunker) before revealing his additional characteristic. In the third trial, it is revealed Toby is a champion poker player who brought his cards. He is saved by Petra in the third round for fun and entertainment.
- Taser Hassan as Nelson. He is given the role of a house-keeper and is not saved in the first round. In the second round, his additional trait is being such an exceptionally kind person that 'the angels would bow their heads as [he] walked through the gates of Heaven'. This does not help him, but Petra argues that they need more boys and Omosedé argues that they need more hard and strong workers from the middle-class, so he is saved in the second round, but not in the third.
- Chanelle Bianca Ho as Mitzie, given the occupation of a wine auctioneer who is not saved in the first round. In the second round, she is revealed to be a genius; however, she is not saved again. In the third round, she is saved by Petra, who says a genius wine auctioneer would be smart enough to bring both red and white wine on a trip, ensuring everyone has a good time.
- Natasha Gott as Yoshiko, cast as an astronaut. Her additional characteristic is never revealed. She is not saved in any trial. However, according to Chips, Yoshiko would live safely on an island with him and the other girls during the third trial.

== Production ==
=== Pre-production ===
Production began on the film in May 2011. During the press conference for the film, director John Huddles said that "multiculturalism was a major theme in the movie, which revolves around a challenge to reboot humanity in the event of a nuclear apocalypse." He also added that in the film "There will be students from Turkey, Iran, Australia, Africa, Canada, United States and United Kingdom."

=== Filming ===
Filming began on 25 June 2011 in Indonesia and continued over seven weeks in different parts of the country including Belitung Island, Sumatra, Bromo in East Java and at the Prambanan Yogyakarta and Sewu temples in Klaten Regency, Central Java, finally ending on 18 August 2011 in Jakarta, Indonesia.

== Marketing ==
In February 2013, the first trailer for the film was released. SCTV revealed the official poster and tagline for the film on 1 June 2013.

== Music ==
After the Dark: Original Motion Picture Soundtrack

Soundtrack album by Jonathan Davis and Nicholas O'Toole
- Released: March 4, 2014 (U.S.)
- Recorded: Various times
- Genre: Soundtrack
- Length: 61:35
- Label: Phase 4 Films
- Producers: Jonathan Davis, Nicholas O'Toole

Jonathan Davis chronology
Queen of the Damned (2003)	After the Dark: Original Motion Picture Soundtrack (2014)

The soundtrack was composed by Jonathan Davis and Nicholas O'Toole. The album also contains the score by Toad the Wet Sprocket's vocalist Glen Phillips.

Soundtrack
No.	Title	Music	Length
1.	"Morning in Jakarta"	Jonathan Davis and Nicholas O'Toole	1:41
2.	"Late for School"	Jonathan Davis and Nicholas O'Toole	1:19
3.	"Exploration"	Jonathan Davis and Nicholas O'Toole	1:08
4.	"Radiological Landscape"	Jonathan Davis and Nicholas O'Toole	1:03
5.	"The Box"	Jonathan Davis and Nicholas O'Toole	1:19
6.	"Death of a Poet"	Jonathan Davis and Nicholas O'Toole	0:57
7.	"The Vote"	Jonathan Davis and Nicholas O'Toole	3:19
8.	"Twenty Agonies"	Jonathan Davis and Nicholas O'Toole	1:41
9.	"Overthrow"	Jonathan Davis and Nicholas O'Toole	1:21
10.	"The Exit Code"	Jonathan Davis and Nicholas O'Toole	2:28
11.	"Year in the Life"	Jonathan Davis and Nicholas O'Toole	8:21
12.	"Bromo"	Jonathan Davis and Nicholas O'Toole	2:05
13.	"A Show of Hands"	Jonathan Davis and Nicholas O'Toole	4:43
14.	"A Change of Chairs"	Jonathan Davis and Nicholas O'Toole	0:32
15.	"Rupture"	Jonathan Davis and Nicholas O'Toole	1:52
16.	"Adjustments"	Jonathan Davis and Nicholas O'Toole	1:54
17.	"Conception"	Jonathan Davis and Nicholas O'Toole	2:43
18.	"Reversals of Fortune"	Jonathan Davis and Nicholas O'Toole	2:54
19.	"A Question"	Jonathan Davis and Nicholas O'Toole	1:50
20.	"Plato’s Cave"	Jonathan Davis and Nicholas O'Toole	1:26
21.	"We Made Pictures"	Glen Phillips	1:27
22.	"Choosing"	Glen Phillips	1:15
23.	"Game of Wits"	Jonathan Davis and Nicholas O'Toole	3:47
24.	"Another Island"	Jonathan Davis and Nicholas O'Toole	1:27
25.	"I Like Your Nose"	Glen Phillips	4:00
26.	"In Our Quieter Times"	Glen Phillips	1:48
27.	"Baroque Reprise"	Jonathan Davis and Nicholas O'Toole	1:21
28.	"Transfigurations"	Jonathan Davis and Nicholas O'Toole	2:13
29.	"Baroque Fugue"	Jonathan Davis and Nicholas O'Toole	1:18
30.	"The Philosophers"	Jonathan Davis and Nicholas O'Toole	1:43
31.	"Jakarta"	Jonathan Davis and Nicholas O'Toole	2:40
Total length:			61:35

== Reception ==
After the Dark premiered in competition at the Neuchâtel International Fantastic Film Festival on 7 July 2013. On review aggregator website Rotten Tomatoes, the film has a 67% rating, with an average score of 5.60/10, based on 15 reviews. On Metacritic, the film has a score of 37 out of 100, based on 7 critics, indicating "generally unfavorable" reviews.

In the reviews from the festival, Out Now gave the film four out of six stars and said, "The Philosophers had a brilliant approach, with which one could not only construct a versatile, but also a hugely exciting film." Severin Auer of Groarr.ch – Filmmagazin gave it a mixed review by saying, "Although The Philosophers has a strong start, the clear weaknesses which the film has to fight can already be found towards the middle part. On the one hand, there are some—though successful—laughs, but these hurt the established seriousness of the mood and accumulate disturbingly towards the end—and the film doesn't want to be a comedy, actually. [...] The film wants to surprise but soon turns out to be sailing known water, which is the opposite it originally intended." He further added that "Nevertheless, the film is in its approach somehow refreshing and well worth seeing. Initially exciting, amusing later."

Upon its theatrical release, Frank Scheck of The Hollywood Reporter gave the film a positive review and said, "This ambitious teen-oriented fantasy is like taking a university philosophy course in The Twilight Zone." Gary Goldstein of the Los Angeles Times wrote: “[This] well-shot sci-fi thriller …is impressively packed with smart, provocative ideas about how we would react to a nuclear holocaust. … [It] brims with metaphor and symbolism … [and features] an attractive array of young actors … [who] ... bring apt heart and conviction to their roles as budding academics.” Brandon Harris of Filmmaker called the film “sneakily beautiful, remarkably thoughtful.” Sherilyn Connelly in her review for The Village Voice said, "[The film is] a shaggy dog story, but an intriguing and frequently beautiful one" and singularly praised Wright by saying that "the picture fumbles the ending, sliding into a Gravity-esque soapy backstory while suggesting that supporting actress Bonnie Wright might have been a stronger female lead." Nicolas Rapold of The New York Times called it "both smugly clever and at times distastefully clueless." Dennis Harvey of Variety called it "talky, tedious and carelessly implausible even by its own rulebook".

== Accolades ==
Year	Award	Category	Recipient	Result	Ref.
2013	Golden Trailer Awards	Best Foreign Horror/Thriller Trailer		Nominated	
2013	Sitges Film Festival	Best Motion Picture	John Huddles	Nominated	
