= Jetsam (film) =

2007 film directed by Simon Welsford

- Directed by: Simon Welsford
- Written by: Simon Welsford
- Produced by: Simon Welsford
- Starring: Alex Reid; Shauna Macdonald; Jamie Draven; Cal Macaninch; Adam Shaw
- Cinematography: Zac Nicholson
- Edited by: Ned Baker
- Music by: Mat Davidson
- Distributed by: Jinga Film
- Release date: 2007
- Running time: 84 minutes
- Country: United Kingdom
- Language: English
- Budget: £3,000 estimated

Jetsam is a 2007 British film thriller, written and directed by Simon Welsford. It was shot in the English seaside resort town of Margate for the no-budget (in film terms) sum of £3,000 (about $5,700) and stars Alex Reid, Shauna Macdonald and Jamie Draven. The two-week shoot wrapped on 27 May 2006, and pre-production was completed nearly a year later, on 8 March 2007. The film premiered at the 51st London International Film Festival, and received many positive notices. It has also received acclaim at the Slamdance Film Festival. It was finally granted a national release in the UK in August 2009. The Margate coast in Kent provided the perfect backdrop for the moody, volatile atmosphere the thriller demanded.

== Plot ==
Grace (Alex Reid) is washed up on a beach along with a man (Jamie Draven) whom she cannot recollect. But since it becomes quickly apparent that the man means to kill her, Grace is forced to resort to extreme measures to stay alive while putting her memory back together.
