= Transformers: Rescue Bots Academy =

Animated television series

- Transformers: Rescue Bots Academy logo
- Genre: Science fiction; Adventure
- Based on: Transformers by Hasbro and Takara Tomy
- Developed by: Nicole Dubuc
- Directed by: Art Director: Luca Centofanti; Episodic Directors: Ray Quigley; Pete Slattery
- Voices of: Pierce Cravens; Courtney Shaw; Alan Trinca; Adam Andrianopoulos; Mason Hensley; Paul Guyet; Frank Cwiklik; Keyon Williams; Michael Hansen; Terrence Flint; Jeremy Levy; Jake Foushee; Billy Bob Thompson; Mark Ashton; Alex Hairston; Bimini Wright; Andy Zou; Todd Perlmutter
- Theme music composer: Doug Califano
- Opening theme: "Rescue Bots Academy" by Zach Allen
- Ending theme: "Rescue Bots Academy" (instrumental)
- Composers: Stuart Kollmorgen; Doug Califano; Keiffer Infantino; Matt Mahaffey
- Countries of origin: United States; Ireland
- Original language: English
- No. of seasons: 2
- No. of episodes: 104

Production
- Executive producers: Stephen Davis; Nicole Dubuc; Kevin Burke; Chris "Doc" Wyatt
- Producer: Peter Lewis
- Production locations: Grand Rapids, Michigan; Hato Rey, San Juan, Puerto Rico
- Running time: 11 minutes
- Production companies: Boulder Media Limited; Allspark Animation

Original release
- Network: Discovery Family
- Release: 8 December 2018 – 5 June 2021

Related
- Transformers: Rescue Bots; Transformers: Prime; Transformers: Robots in Disguise

Transformers: Rescue Bots Academy (or simply Rescue Bots Academy) is an animated children's television series on Discovery Family. Based on toy manufacturer Hasbro's Transformers franchise, the series is a sequel of Transformers: Rescue Bots, sharing the name with the Rescue Bots season three episode called "Rescue Bots Academy". It was created by Rescue Bots co-creator Nicole Dubuc. The first two episodes were previewed on 8 December 2018, and officially premiered on 5 January 2019. The voice cast of Rescue Bots leaves their roles, with existing characters being recast with New York–based voice actors. The voice acting was done at Big Little Duck in New York.

== Premise ==
School is in session at the Transformers: Rescue Bots Academy, where Griffin Rock's heroes—Heatwave the Fire-Bot, Chase the Police-Bot, Blades the Copter-Bot, and Boulder the Construction-Bot—are ready to train a new batch of recruits. Just arriving on Earth from their home world of Cybertron, young Cube player Hot Shot, aspiring rescue hero Hoist, the enthusiastic Whirl, Construction-bot Wedge and field medic appropriately named Medix have the honor of being the first class in history to enroll in the Rescue Bots Academy, a highly advanced training facility located at a top-secret base. With encouragement from Optimus Prime, Bumblebee, and Grimlock, the new recruits learn the power of team building through simulated and real-life rescue missions that highlight the importance of heroism, teamwork, and most importantly, friendship.

== Characters ==
=== Autobots ===
==== Rescue Bots Recruits ====
- Hot Shot (voiced by Pierce Cravens) is a former Cube player recruited by Optimus Prime, who also gives him a Mul-T-Change T-cog that lets him use a different vehicle mode per day. His regular vehicle mode is a red and yellow ATV, while his alternate forms are a red jet plane and a yellow and red hovercraft boat. He later gains a fourth vehicle form in Season 2 by scanning Heatwave's fire truck mode.
- Whirl (voiced by Courtney Shaw) is an enthusiastic police trainee who, like Chase, has studied the rules of being a Rescue Bot, and who serves as the team's optimist and sister figure. She transforms into a blue and light gray police helicopter, and later adopts Chase's blue squad police car form during Season 2's Multi-change story arc.
- Hoist (voiced by Alan Trinca) is an aspiring inventor and mechanic who transforms into a teal green tow truck. In Season 1, he was revealed to be afraid of dinosaurs when Grimlock arrived at the academy, later fully overcoming his fear in Season 2's "Mission Dinobot." During season 2's T-cog story arc, he scanned Grimlock's Tyrannosaurus Rex form to become a Dinobot himself.
- Medix (voiced by Adam Andrianopoulous) is a Rescue Bots recruit who does not like surprises and works purely with logic. He serves as the team's intelligence officer on missions and transforms into a white emergency response car with green zaglines and a red light bar mounted on the roof. During Season 2's T-Cog story arc, he gains Blade's white and orange rescue helicopter form as a second form.
- Wedge (voiced by Mason Hensley) is a former Decepticon turned leader who turns into an orange payloader. He had a rivalry with Hot Shot in Season 1 and shares Blades' fanboy attitude towards Bumblebee. He even has a collection of trading cards detailing all the major Autobots called "Heroes of Cybertron." His Decepticon past is revealed in the Season 2 episode "More Than Meets the Eye" when the team is not certain how to deal with Laserbeak. Like Hot Shot, Optimus Prime believed he had potential and recruited him. He later gains a second sports car mode in homage to his idol Bumblebee. Wedge has a fear of heights as first stated in season one.

==== Rescue Force Sigma-17 and Faculty ====
- Heatwave (voiced by Paul Guyet) is the leader of Rescue Force Sigma-17 and the academy's chief instructor. He transforms into a red fire engine with an extending ladder, a red fire boat, and a brontosaurus due to the events of the original TV cartoon. In the second season he becomes Hot Shot's mentor, and allows Hot Shot to scan his form in the same season.
- Chase (voiced by Frank Cwiklik) is a second-in-command for the Rescue Bots, Chase is a by-the-books police officer and one of Whirl's favourite teachers. He transforms into a dark blue and white police car, as well as a robotic stegosaurus due to the events of the original TV series. In the second season he becomes Whirl's mentor, and allows Whirl to scan his form in the same season.
- Boulder (voiced by Keyon Williams) is a gentle giant who serves as the bulk and science officer of Rescue Force Sigma-17. He serves as the trainees' teacher on Earth studies and transforms into a green bulldozer in addition to his robotic triceratops form from the original TV show's third season.
- Blades (voiced by Michael Hansen) is a perky Rescue bot who turns into a rotund orange and white rescue helicopter and is one of Whirl's favourite teachers. In the original TV series, he also transformed into a white and orange pterodactyl. In the second season he becomes Medix's mentor, and allows Medix to scan his form in the same season.
- Grimlock (voiced by Terrence Flint) – portrayed as a hybrid of his Fall of Cybertron and RID 2015 selves, Grimlock is an old friend of Optimus Prime and Bumblebee who serves as the bots' gym and field operations coach, He transforms into a mechanical T-Rex and still has his cat phobia from Transformers: Robots in Disguise. In the second season he becomes Hoist's mentor, and allows Hoist to scan his T-Rex form in the same season.
- Bumblebee (voiced by Jeremy Levy) is a member of Optimus Prime's team who transforms into a yellow muscle car with black racing stripes, and Grimlock's former commanding officer from Bee Team. In the second season he becomes Wedge's mentor, and allows Wedge to scan his sports car form in the same season.
- Ratchet (voiced by Todd Perimutter) is Optimus Prime's friend and chief medical officer who transforms into a white Ford ambulance. He is later revealed to be Medix's uncle and one of the academy's guest lecturers.
- Perceptor (voiced by Jeremy Levy) is an Autobot science and intelligence officer who served alongside Optimus during the Great War for Cybertron. He transforms into a red science expedition vehicle and can downsize himself into a microscope that can be used by other Transformers. In his debut episode, Bumblebee convinces Perceptor to join the academy as its math and science professor.

==== Cube Players ====
- Scorch (voiced by Adam Andrianopoulos) is Hot Shot's old friend and leader of the Cyberblazers Cube team.
- Mach is a Cube player who turns into a sports car.
- Glow (voiced by Courtney Shaw) is a female Cube player who resembles the Decepticon Glowstrike from 2015's Robots in Disguise spinoff to Transformers: Prime. She seems to turn into a red motorcycle.

==== Others ====
- Optimus Prime (voiced by Jake Foushee, Hiro Diaz in "Recruits") is the benevolent leader of the Autobots who turns into a semi-trailer truck cab.
- Sludge (voiced by Billy Bob Thompson) is a Dinobot science officer who transforms into a metallic apatosaurus with red and silver body Armor. He has not been seen since the Transformers: Prime tie-in comics, Rage of the Dinobots, and Transformers Beast Hunters issues 1–8.
- Snarl (voiced by Mark Ashton) is the Dinobots' tactical officer and one of Grimlock's old war friends who tends to be grouchy. He transforms into a mechanical stegosaurus with red spinal plates.
- Slash (voiced by Alex Hairston) is a female dinobot who turns into a velociraptor. She is an expert tracker and an old friend of Grimlock's who prefers to work alone. After getting herself in trouble while trying to rescue Griffin Rock news reporter Huxley Prescott, Whirl teaches her it pays to have a partner watching out for her.
- Brushfire (voiced by Bimini Wright) is a lone Cybertronian on Earth in Australia who transforms into an orange halftrack ATV. She previously appeared exclusively in the toy line, and makes her onscreen debut in Season 2's 31st episode "Brushfire," where she meets and befriends Whirl when the Rescue Bots arrive to help her with mobs of kangaroos.

=== Decepticons ===
- Lazerbeak is Soundwave's former helper and a retired Decepticon. Lazerbeak was found injured by the Rescue Bots in "More than Meets the Eye" when his shuttle was damaged and Hoist retrieved his cassette form before waking him up. After Wedge got rid of their prejudice, the Bots took him back to the academy to heal the wound on his left wing.

=== Humans ===
- Cody Burns (voiced by Andy Zou) is the first kid who befriended Heatwave's team in the original series, and the youngest member of the Burns Family Emergency Response team; he helps Heatwave teach the recruits whenever he is not too busy.
- Wes (voiced by Xander Crowell) is a member of Cody's Teen Pioneer troupe who is a fan of the Rescue Bots and idolizes Wedge.
- Francine Greene (voiced by Kaitlin Becker) is Cody's best friend since childhood and the second youth to learn the Autobots' true nature in the original series, Frankie is the eldest child of Griffin Rock's resident genius scientist, Dr. Ezra Greene, and is a science prodigy. She and Doc make their first reappearance in the Season 2 episode "Partners."

=== Other cast ===
- Tough Luck Chuck (voiced by Todd Perlmutter)
- Scraplets –
- Citadel Secundus (voiced by Frank Cwiklik) is a Titan

== Episodes ==
=== Series overview ===
Season	Episodes	Originally aired	
Season	Episodes	Season premiere	Season finale
1	52	8 December 2018	30 November 2019
2	52	21 March 2020	5 June 2021

=== Season 1 (2018–19) ===
- This season takes place during the Rescue Bot recruits' first year at the academy.

No. overall	No. in season	Title	Directed by	Written by	Original release date	Prod. code	U.S. viewers (millions)
1	1	"Recruits"	Ray Quigley	Nicole Dubuc	8 December 2018	001-002	N/A
2	2	"Recruits"	Pete Slattery	Nicole Dubuc	8 December 2018	001-002	N/A
Part 1: Optimus Prime picks Hot Shot to be part of a new team of Rescue Bot recruits, but even Hot Shot himself has doubts he is up to the task. Part 2: Hot Shot learns to find his place on the Rescue Bot Recruit team with the help of the Mul-T-Cog and his friends.
3	3	"If at First..."	Ray Quigley	Brian Hohlfeld	5 January 2019	006	N/A
At his teammates' urging, Hoist invents some new 'cool tools' to improve their rescue abilities. They fail spectacularly, leaving Hoist feeling awful, until Boulder teaches him not to give up.
4	4	"Tough Luck Chuck"	Ray Quigley	Brian Hohlfeld	5 January 2019	003	N/A
Hot Shot has to baby-sit the damaged RBA Test Robot, who will not stay put.
5	5	"Whirl'd View"	Pete Slattery	Jodi Reynolds	12 January 2019	005	N/A
Whirl's Police Bot attention to procedure and detail saves the day when the recruits get caught in a snow storm.
6	6	"Plan Bee"	Ray Quigley	Peter A. Dowling	12 January 2019	004	N/A
The Rescue Bots learn that every life on earth needs every other, so there are no small rescues.
7	7	"The Bot Who Cried Rescue"	Pete Slattery	Ciarán Morrison & Mick O'Hara	19 January 2019	008	N/A
Wedge is put in charge of practicing the Recruits' response time, but his drive for perfection does more harm than good.
8	8	"Mount Botmore"	Pete Slattery	Nathan Cockerill	19 January 2019	007	N/A
Hot Shot's 'big head' gets him in trouble, literally, when his own giant sculpture threatens to destroy Griffin Rock.
9	9	"Mission Inaudible"	Ray Quigley	Marc Seal	26 January 2019	011	N/A
Hoist is made leader of a mission, but he struggles to trust his own ideas and lets others lead instead—with nearly disastrous results.
10	10	"Glitch"	Pete Slattery	Danny Stack	26 January 2019	009	N/A
Medix's dedication to logic comes in useful after he learns a glitch trick from one of the computer simulations.
11	11	"Five Into Four"	Ray Quigley	Ben Ward	2 February 2019	010	N/A
The recruits worry that one of their team members will be cut when they notice that there are five of them, but only four Rescue Bots.
12	12	"Rescue Promo"	Pete Slattery	Ciarán Morrison and Mick O'Hara	2 February 2019	013	N/A
When Whirl is given a task, she insists on doing it alone, discovering the hard way that there is no "I" in team.
13	13	"Blame Game"	Pete Slattery	Peter A. Dowling	9 February 2019	012	N/A
Blaming his teammates for a failed exercise that made him miss a cube game on Cybertron, Hot Shot tackles a rescue alone to show off his solo skills.
14	14	"Medix Surprise"	Pete Slattery	Ciarán Morrison and Mick O'Hara	9 February 2019	014	N/A
Medix does not like surprises but the other recruits decide that it is only because has never had the right kind of surprise, so they set-up a Medix-themed rescue mission with disastrous results.
15	15	"The TX3000"	Ray Quigley	Nathan Cockerill	16 February 2019	016	N/A
Each recruit gets to train with the ultimate rescue tool, the TX3000, but Hot Shot has never used one before, and his failure to admit his lack of experience almost botches a dangerous rescue.
16	16	"Little Bot Peep"	Ray Quigley	Marc Seal	16 February 2019	015	N/A
Hoist needs to spend time in his stasis pod, but cannot bear to miss out on the action and keeps heading back before he has recuperated. He discovers that a damaged bot is a dangerous bot.
17	17	"Driving a Wedge"	Pete Slattery	Ciarán Morrison & Mick O'Hara	23 February 2019	017	N/A
Griffin Rock Lad Pioneer Wes wins a day at the Academy to spend with each the Recruits in turn. However, Wedge keeps avoiding spending time with him as unlike the other bots, he does not think that a mere construction bot has anything to offer.
18	18	"The Big, Small Rescue"	Pete Slattery	Danny Stack	23 February 2019	019	N/A
The bots are surprised to discover that their important off-planet mission is actually to save a single tiny plant.
19	19	"Go Team, Go!"	Ray Quigley	Brian Hohlfeld	2 March 2019	018	N/A
Whirl tries to teach the Recruits cheerleading routines believing it will inspire them on their rescues. They are not interested until they realize she has taught them a valuable lesson in teamwork.
20	20	"About a Rock"	Ray Quigley	Brian Hohlfeld	2 March 2019	021	N/A
Heatwave brings back what he thinks is a sample from an asteroid, and blames the Recruits when it disappears. While searching for it to clear their names, the Recruits quickly discover that the "rock" is actually an alien—and it is loose in the Headquarters.
21	21	"Dog Stray Afternoon"	Pete Slattery	Ciarán Morrison & Mick O'Hara	9 March 2019	020	N/A
When a cute dog follows the recruits back from a mission, the recruits decide to keep him as a pet, despite Academy rules to the contrary.
22	22	"Lucky Ducky"	Pete Slattery	Ciarán Morrison & Mick O'Hara	9 March 2019	024	N/A
Hot Shot beats his bad luck with the help of Cody's good luck charm—a rubber ducky.
23	23	"The Secret of Flight"	Pete Slattery	Ben Ward	16 March 2019	022	N/A
Hot Shot gets help with his flying technique from a surprising visitor.
24	24	"Battle of the Bots"	Ray Quigley	Marc Seal	16 March 2019	023	N/A
When Wedge rashly challenges Hot Shot to a one-on-one challenge, he worries that he does not have the skills to win.
25	25	"Screen Time"	Ray Quigley	Peter A. Dowling	23 March 2019	026	N/A
When the Bots are given smartphones as part of Earth Studies, they become distracted and inattentive which causes problems when they have to focus and rescue Wes from a mine.
26	26	"Fright at the Museum"	Ray Quigley	Jodi Reynolds	23 March 2019	025	N/A
When the team visits the local museum, they think Whirl has gone into police overdrive.
27	27	"Space Case"	Ray Quigley	Brian Hohlfield	7 September 2019	030	N/A
When the Bots become stranded in space while making repairs on the Asgard, the Recruits have to figure out who does what in order to perform a daring rescue.
28	28	"All at Sea"	Ray Quigley	Jodi Reynolds	7 September 2019	028	N/A
Boulder leads the class on an underwater ocean clean-up mission, but the recruits are so busy competing with each other, they stumble into danger.
29	29	"All Washed Up"	Pete Slattery	Nicole Dubuc	7 September 2019	029	N/A
Hoist builds a cleaning droid to help scrub the academy, but instead it nearly destroys the building.
30	30	"Who's Teaching Who?"	Pete Slattery	Danny Stack	7 September 2019	027	N/A
The bots swap roles with the teachers to show them that learning can be fun, but their efforts backfire when they are called out on rescue.
31	31	"Balloon Up a Tree"	Pete Slattery	Nathan Cockerill	14 September 2019	031	N/A
The Recruits attempt to rescue a balloon from a tree but end up on top of a rocket.
32	32	"The Mystery of Dragon Mountain"	Ray Quigley	Ben Ward	14 September 2019	034	N/A
When they tackle a fantasy simulation that pits them against a fire-breathing dragon, the Recruits learn that the obvious answer is not always the right one.
33	33	"Hack Attack"	Peter Slattery	Jodi Reynolds	21 September 2019	032	N/A
When Hot Shot replaces Chase's traffic stop simulation for his computer game, the Recruits find themselves unprepared as they face giant hedgehogs.
34	34	"Life of the Party"	Ray Quigley	Brian Hohlfeld	21 September 2019	033	N/A
When the other Recruits tell Medix he is a "stick in the mud," he enlists Chase to help him learn how to loosen up. But Medix's newfound sense of humor threatens a rescue and his value to the team.
35	35	"Tyrannosaurus Wrecked"	Peter Slattery	Jodi Reynolds	28 September 2019	036	N/A
Hoist fears new academy teacher Grimlock until the team stages an intervention to show him that everyone is afraid of something.
36	36	"Dino Hard"	Ray Quigley	Peter A. Dowling	28 September 2019	035	N/A
Alone in the academy with a Triceratops, Hoist must overcome his fear of dinosaurs and calm the savage beast.
37	37	"Buddy Cop"	Peter Slattery	Jodi Reynolds	5 October 2019	039	N/A
When the recruits take part in a training exercise for covert policing, Hot Shot is partnered with the least stealthy of all Rescue Bots, Grimlock.
38	38	"Escape from Penguin Island"	Peter Slattery	Ben Ward	5 October 2019	037	N/A
When the team is sent to evacuate a colony of rare Yellow-eyed penguins from an island, an approaching electrical storm affects the Trainees' abilities and they discover the only tool they have left is their brains.
39	39	"All the Glitters"	Ray Quigley	Jodi Reynolds & Brain Hohlfeld	19 October 2019	038	N/A
Hoist uses an unfair advantage to win a search game, allowing him to choose the location for the next Sim Exercise. He picks the Old West, and as the Recruits search for gold, Hoist learns that winning is not everything.
40	40	"Dig Fest"	Pete Slattery	Nathan Cockerill	19 October 2019	042	N/A
While looking for crashed pieces of a space satellite, Wedge pulls off a spectacular rescue at Dig Fest and becomes the unlikely star of the show.
41	41	"Trick or Treat"	Pete Slattery	Danny Stack	26 October 2019	041	N/A
The Bots experience their first Halloween and Wedge goes dressed up as Bumblebee. However, his 'heroic' behavior backfires when the Recruits respond to a fire rescue.
42	42	"Monster Savings"	Ray Quigley	Ben Ward	26 October 2019	040	N/A
Medix mistakes a TV commercial for a real monster attack in Milford and sets off to save the city.
43	43	"Tune Out"	Pete Slattery	Ciarán Morrison & Mick O’hara	2 November 2019	043	N/A
When Hoist is put in charge of a new sonic fence, he can only remember its access code by creating a tune. But when that tune becomes too catchy and endangers missions, the team have to learn to remain calm to succeed.
44	44	"Metal Munchers"	Ray Quigley	Nicole Dubuc	2 November 2019	046	N/A
On a field trip to an area of natural beauty, the recruits face a swarm of metal-munching Scraplets.
45	45	"Bee Prepared"	Pete Slattery	Nathan Cockerill	9 November 2019	044	N/A
Wedge is excited when his hero Bumblebee visits the academy as a guest teacher, but the young bot's attempts to impress backfire.
46	46	"Whirl's Wise-Bot Quest"	Pete Slattery	Marc Seal	9 November 2019	045	N/A
When Whirl struggles with a tricky maneuver, she doubts her place on the team; Blades tries to reassure Whirl by mentioning a distant Rescue Bot Guru who once helped him.
47	47	"Flying Hunk-A-Junk"	Ray Quigley	Peter A. Dowling	16 November 2019	048	N/A
When the Bots go on a satellite repair mission, their carelessly discarded trash hurtles around the Earth's orbit, growing into a problem big enough to destroy them and the Sigma.
48	48	"Into the Depths"	Pete Slattery	Fionn Boland	16 November 2019	047	N/A
The Recruits travel deep underwater to find an unmanned submersible, but a struggle to communicate effectively in the deep, dark waters nearly scuppers the mission.
49	49	"Milford Goes to the Dogs"	Ray Quigley	Ben Ward	23 November 2019	049	N/A
When the dogs start behaving strangely near the Academy, Hoist sees the investigation as an opportunity to try out his new communications system, but it is the comms that are the problem.
50	50	"The Ice Wave"	Pete Slattery	Ben Ward	23 November 2019	050	N/A
When the Rescue Bots face a sim they are unable to beat, they must learn to deal with failure and focus on what is really important.
51	51	"Best Bots Forever"	Pete Slattery	Ciarán Morrison & Mick O'Hara	30 November 2019	051-052	N/A
52	52	"Best Bots Forever"	Pete Slattery	Ciarán Morrison & Mick O'Hara	30 November 2019	051-052	N/A
There's no 'I' in team.

=== Season 2 (2020–21) ===
- This season takes place during the Rescue Bot recruits' final test of second year at the academy.

On 5 September 2018, the series was renewed for a second season of another 52 11–minute episodes that premiered on 21 March 2020. The first six episodes of season 2 were released earlier on Google Play on 14 February 2020. It is also the last season of the series.

No. overall	No. in season	Title	Directed by	Written by	Original release date	Prod. code	U.S. viewers (millions)
53	1	"Back to School"	Ray Quigley	Jodi Reynolds	21 March 2020	054	N/A
The recruits start their second year of training and learn they will get personal tutors.
54	2	"Mission Dinobot"	Pete Slattery	Jodi Reynolds	21 March 2020	053	N/A
Hoist has to stop avoiding his new mentor Grimlock when the pair have to team up with two more Dinobots on a mission.
55	3	"In Training"	Ray Quigley	Peter A. Dowling	28 March 2020	056	N/A
When Hot Shot is given chores to do by Heatwave rather than what he considers real training, he is stunned to find that everything is a learning experience and Heatwave is a great teacher.
56	4	"Medix Steps Up to the Bat"	Ray Quigley	Marc Seal	28 March 2020	055	N/A
When Medix brings a bat with him to Cybertron, chaos ensues. As Hot Shot gets blamed for it all, Medix has to accept that a high-tech environment probably is not the best place for a wild creature.
57	5	"Robo-Cody"	Ray Quigley	Nathan Cockerill	4 April 2020	058	N/A
When the Bots mistakenly think Cody wants to be physically like them, they build him a robo-suit that causes serious metal mayhem.
58	6	"Heatwave's Shiny Coat"	Pete Slattery	Marc Seal	4 April 2020	057	N/A
Medix is sure he has a list for every possible emergency ever. To teach him the value of improvising in the moment, his mentor, Blades, has him look after a very unpredictable dog.
59	7	"Acting Out"	Pete Slattery	Ciarán Morrison & Mick O'Hara	18 April 2020	060	N/A
The recruits' latest mission is to star in the Griffin Rock 'Play in the Park'. The recruits are delighted, except for Wedge who believes that it is a waste of time as it is not rescue work.
60	8	"Need to Know"	Pete Slattery	Kevin Burke & Chris Wyatt	18 April 2020	059	N/A
When Wedge and Bumblebee go on a rescue mission to save families of rock creatures from a meteor shower, they need help from Cybertron, in the form of Perceptor.
61	9	"Trouble Cubed"	Ray Quigley	Ben Ward	25 April 2020	062	N/A
When Hot Shot 'borrows' Grimlock's cube without asking, things rapidly get out of hand and the only one who can help is Grimlock himself.
62	10	"My Favorite Rescue"	Pete Slattery	Nathan Cockerill	25 April 2020	061	N/A
As a treat for doing well in training, the recruits are allowed to choose their favorite simulated rescue.
63	11	"The Great Energon Rush"	Ray Quigley	Ben Ward	2 May 2020	064	N/A
When Hoist goes prospecting in the hope of striking energon, he finds that rickety old mines are not built for Bots, especially big scary Dinobots.
64	12	"The Vault of the Primes"	Pete Slattery	Ciarán Morrison & Mick O'Hara	2 May 2020	063	N/A
Ratchet invites the Recruits to help open an ancient Cybertronian Vault. However, the vault will not give up its secrets that easily and challenges the recruits to complete an ancient Sim Mission to prove that they are worthy of its treasures.
65	13	"Wild Ghost Chase"	Pete Slattery	Fionn Boland	9 May 2020	065	N/A
For her first detective mission of year two, Whirl is tasked with investigating the paranormal with her skeptical new partner, Medix.
66	14	"Little Plot of Horrors"	Pete Slattery	Fionn Boland	9 May 2020	066	N/A
Upon discovering the Galax plant from planet Parvus is still being housed in the academy's quarantine, Medix sets about finding the plant a new home.
67	15	"Museum Mystery"	Ray Quigley	Jacob Semahn	16 May 2020	068	N/A
When Chase takes Whirl on a mission to guard an exhibit at Griffin Rock’s newest museum, a major theft convinces Chase that the former criminals, and long-time Rescue Bots foes, Evan and Myles, are back in action.
68	16	"Partners"	Pete Slattery	Jodi Reynolds	16 May 2020	067	N/A
The entire Academy face an epic mission to rescue Cody's best friend, Frankie, who is trapped inside a seemingly impenetrable dome that is shrinking by the minute.
69	17	"Critical Condition"	Pete Slattery	Ciarán Morrison & Mick O'Hara	23 May 2020	069	N/A
Even though Medix is just trying to help his fellow Rescue Bot recruits train in new rescue techniques, the others find Medix to be overly harsh and critical.
70	18	"Fun-Droids"	Ray Quigley	Nathan Cockerill	23 May 2020	072	N/A
The recruits visit a fair run by a team of rule-loving Fun Droids, but when the droids malfunction it is not just the rules that get broken.
71	19	"Power Up and Energize"	Ray Quigley	Ciarán Morrison & Mick O'Hara	30 May 2020	070	N/A
Each recruit receives a new tool that their individual spark picks for them. However, Hot Shot is not happy with his and convinces Wedge to swap. However, they soon discover that their 'spark' knows best.
72	20	"Shall We Dance?"	Ray Quigley	Danny Stack	30 May 2020	071	N/A
Cody surprises the bots by making them do ballet lessons as part of their training, something which Medix finds particularly difficult to embrace.
73	21	"Mul-T-Change of Pace"	Ray Quigley	Peter A. Dowling	6 June 2020	074	N/A
Hot Shot is told his Mul-T-Cog can be used to Mul-T-Change, but discovers that the key to making that happen is not all about himself.
74	22	"Five Little Rescue Bots"	Ray Quigley	Danny Stack	6 June 2020	075	N/A
Whirl's power of observation is tested when the Rescue Bots disappear one by one on a training exercise.
75	23	"Good Advice"	Pete Slattery	Jacob Semahn	20 June 2020	073	N/A
After a smug string of handing out sage advice to his fellow Bots, Medix is now faced with the dilemma of having to listen to his own "simple" words of wisdom. Wrestling over his own words, he finds out that doing the right thing is not always easy.
76	24	"Campfire Fright"	Pete Slattery	Ciarán Morrison & Mick O'Hara	20 June 2020	076	N/A
Cody takes the Recruits on a camping trip. When he tells them a spooky campfire tale, Hot Shot gets spooked. When they return to the Academy, Hot Shot hears strange sounds and comes to the conclusion that the 'Zombie Ghost Bear' has followed them back.
77	25	"Small Cogs"	Ray Quigley	Jodi Reynolds	27 June 2020	078	N/A
The recruits are all excited about getting their new Mul-T-Cogs – a little too excited, as Hot Shot convinces them to take them before they are ready. It leads to big problems and a big decision for Hot Shot that he never could have imagined.
78	26	"Big Wheels"	Pete Slattery	Jodi Reynolds	27 June 2020	077	N/A
As the recruits face some big decisions about their new Mul-T-Cog vehicle forms, Hot Shot must decide what is really important to his rescue work. And unexpectedly, it is his mentor, Heatwave, who is the one who inspires him.
79	27	"The Empty City"	Ray Quigley	Ben Ward	6 March 2021	080	N/A
When the recruits respond to an intergalactic distress signal, they discover Scorch and his friends under attack from an abandoned city. But Scorch did not send the signal. So who is in distress?
80	28	"First Responder"	Pete Slattery	Fionn Boland	6 March 2021	079	N/A
Wedge is faced with a tough decision after mentor training day, while Wes is about to take his Griffin Rock First Responder exam.
81	29	"How To Train Your Scraplet"	Ray Quigley	Nathan Cockerill	13 March 2021	082	N/A
Medix's patience is put to the test when the recruits are given the task of training five metal-munching Scraplets.
82	30	"Helicopter Heroes"	Pete Slattery	Danny Stack	13 March 2021	081	N/A
Whirl feels Medix is getting preferential treatment in helicopter mode but her insecurity risks the safety of both of them during a rescue.
83	31	"Brushfire"	Ray Quigley	Ciarán Morrison & Mick O'Hara	20 March 2021	085	N/A
Whirl has got so used to being part of a team that she does not like to make decisions without them, even though she is perfectly capable of doing so.
84	32	"The Ties That Bind"	Pete Slattery	Marc Seal	20 March 2021	083	N/A
Whirl has to rescue a powered-down Scorch – and as he refuses to fly, spend all day towing him back to the Academy.
85	33	"Bot Blog"	Ray Quigley	Ciarán Morrison & Mick O'Hara	27 March 2021	084	N/A
Whirl is so excited to use the new Bot Blog that she posts an embarrassing video of Hot Shot without asking his permission first. When she realizes her mistake, it is too late as the clip has gone viral.
86	34	"The Icebot Cometh"	Pete Slattery	Fionn Boland	27 March 2021	089	N/A
A runaway train on Griffin Rock forces Wedge to reflect on his new vehicle form, while Heatwave, Medix, and Whirl endure the comedic stylings of Mayor Luskey.
87	35	"More Than Meets the Eye"	Ray Quigley	Kevin Burke & Chris "Doc" Wyatt	3 April 2021	087	N/A
When the Recruits rescue a Decepticon from a damaged ship, they disagree on how to treat the 'evil' bot, forcing Wedge to reveal his biggest secret.
88	36	"Things That Go Bot in the Night"	Pete Slattery	Ben Ward	3 April 2021	086	N/A
When things mysteriously start to get damaged around the Academy, Hoist investigates. But when the evidence points to a Dinobot culprit, the whole case becomes much more personal.
89	37	"Medix Gets Schooled"	Pete Slattery	Marc Seal	17 April 2021	088	N/A
Medix is sure Perceptor will be thrilled to have him as a student. So when the science professor seems more interested in the other recruits, Medix determines to get himself noticed.
90	38	"Rescue Teens"	Pete Slattery	Nathan Cockerill	17 April 2021	092	N/A
When some human teenagers become famous rescue heroes, the Rescue Bot recruits must deal with their jealousy.
91	39	"Enter the Flood"	Ray Quigley	Ben Ward	24 April 2021	090	N/A
A field trip to a distant planet goes awry when the team accidentally interfere with the local wildlife.
92	40	"Wizard of Botz"	Pete Slattery	Ciarán Morrison & Mick O'Hara	24 April 2021	091	N/A
Optimus Prime is meeting each recruit for their 'Student Progress Review'. Whirl fears her run of good reviews might be broken, so she does everything she can to avoid having that meeting.
93	41	"The Tracker"	Ray Quigley	Fionn Boland	1 May 2021	094	N/A
Upon discovering that Griffin Rock journalist, Huxley Prescott, has gone missing deep in the jungle, Whirl enlists the help of an expert tracker to help her find him.
94	42	"One of Our Dragons is Missing"	Pete Slattery	Ben Ward	1 May 2021	093	N/A
When Hoist and Hot Shot fail to deal with a small problem in Hero Hall, things quickly escalate and soon they are dealing with the much larger problem of a dragon attacking Milford.
95	43	"Dino-mite Duo"	Ray Quigley	Kevin Burke & Chris "Doc" Wyatt	8 May 2021	095	N/A
When the Rescue Bots and recruits are all away from the Academy, Sludge and Snarl are put in charge.
96	44	"The Lonely Titan"	Pete Slattery	Marc Seal	8 May 2021	097	N/A
When Wedge tires of his friends constantly interrupting him, he volunteers for a solo mission on a Titan. But seeing how much the Titan values his companionship, Wedge gains a new appreciation for the value of true friendship.
97	45	"X Marks the Bot"	Ray Quigley	Danny Stack	15 May 2021	096	N/A
The Bots travel to Ireland to follow a Cybertronian treasure trail, or so they think.
98	46	"Making Tracks"	Pete Slattery	Jodi Reynolds	15 May 2021	098	N/A
When Wedge needs a speed coach, Bumblebee thinks Hot Shot will be the perfect choice. But Hot Shot soon learns that teaching can be as tricky as learning.
99	47	"Don't Be Alarmed"	Ray Quigley	Nathan Cockerill	22 May 2021	100	N/A
A mission gives the recruits a chance to test out their new homemade sirens, but some alien creatures do not react well to loud noise.
100	48	"Powerless"	Pete Slattery	Danny Stack	22 May 2021	099	N/A
The Recruits get skilled with their power-up tools but are challenged with a rescue where they cannot use them.
101	49	"Griffin Rock Rocks!"	Ray Quigley	Ciarán Morrison & Mick O'Hara	29 May 2021	102	N/A
Medix's favorite DJ is playing a concert at Griffin Rock. However, as there will be so many out-of-towners attending, the bots have to remain out of sight. But when the DJ's show needs rescuing, Medix and the recruits must take center stage.
102	50	"Bot Battle"	Pete Slattery	Fionn Boland	29 May 2021	101	N/A
After dismissing Tough Luck Chuck, Hot Shot decides to enter Bot Battle, an all-smashing, all-crashing, Robo-rampage. However, he soon discovers that Chuck may well be his toughest competition.
103	51	"Space Party"	Ray Quigley	Jodi Reynolds	5 June 2021	104	N/A
It is the final test to graduate Year Two and the recruits are nervous. Though Hot Shot has something else on his mind – making sure his teachers know just how much he appreciates them. And thanks to a perilous turn of events, he might just get the chance to prove it.
104	52	"Crash Of The Titan"	Pete Slattery	Kevin Burke & Chris "Doc" Wyatt	5 June 2021	103	N/A
Citadel Secundus is in jeopardy and the people on board are fast asleep! Wedge, Hoist, and Medix need to help everyone on board, while Hot Shot and Whirl have to assemble the new team of Rescue Recruits and save Citadel Secundus.

== Production ==
Shortly after its acquisition by Hasbro, Boulder Media Limited started developing a Transformers series, The series was first announced on 7 June 2017, with Transformers: Rescue Bots officially ending production. along with Transformers: Cyberverse.

On 16 July 2017, voice actor D.C. Douglas, who voiced Chase in Transformers: Rescue Bots, announced that he would not reprise his role in this series. He has also confirmed that the voice cast for this series are non-union New York–based voice actors.

On 23 July 2017, Ben Ward joined the series as writer.

On 4 August 2017, at Hasbro Investor Day 2017, the show's runtime was announced to be 11 minutes.

On 25 December 2017, it was revealed that the first season consists of 52 11-minute episodes.

On 21 March 2018, the series was announced to air on Discovery Family in Fall 2018.

An episode was released on December 8, 2018.

On 5 September 2018, Ciarán Morrison and Mick O'Hara joined the series as writers. Additionally, the series was renewed for a second season of another 52 11-minute episodes.

A poster was released on 3 October 2018, and the release date has been rescheduled back to 2019.

A sneak peek consisting of the first two episodes aired on 8 December 2018. The series began proper airings on 5 January 2019.

In late 2020, it was announced that the show would end production after the Season 2 finale, ending the show with the same number of episodes as its predecessor.

== Broadcast and release ==
In the United States, the series premiered with a two episode sneak peek on 8 December 2018, and officially premiered on 5 January 2019, on Discovery Family. It premiered on Nickelodeon in Germany, Nick Jr. in India, TiJi in France, Frisbee in Italy, e-Junior in the United Arab Emirates, Tiny Pop in the UK, TVP ABC in Poland, Karusel in Russia, Treehouse TV in Canada, Minimax in CEE and Arutz HaYeladim in Israel.

The show aired on reruns on Discovery Family until March 2023.
