= Who Killed Nelson Nutmeg? =

- Film poster
- Directed by: Tim Clague; Danny Stack
- Written by: James Carey; Tim Clague; Danny Stack
- Produced by: Jan Caston; Tim Clague; Danny Stack
- Starring: Bonnie Wright
- Cinematography: Sam Morgan Moore
- Edited by: Fiorella Santaniello
- Music by: Titas Petrikis
- Production company: Nelson Nutmeg Pictures
- Distributed by: Evolutionary Films (UK); TriCoast Entertainment (USA)
- Release date: 10 October 2015 (BFI London Film Festival)
- Running time: 82 minutes
- Country: United Kingdom
- Language: English

Who Killed Nelson Nutmeg? is a 2015 British independent family comedy-mystery film written and directed by Tim Clague and Danny Stack and starring Bonnie Wright.

== Premise ==
Four children on a summer camp holiday suspect the park's mascot, Nelson Nutmeg, has been murdered so they set out to investigate.

== Cast ==
- Bonnie Wright as Diane
- Loretta Walsh as Billie
- Hattie Gotobed as The Colonel
- James Grogan as Woody
- JJ Brown as Shiv
- Jonah Alexander as Swindon
- Mark Vernon Freestone as Uncle Derek
- Russell Biles as Mr Slug
- Jamie Lee-Hill as Nelson Nutmeg

== Production ==
Who Killed Nelson Nutmeg? was filmed on location in Bournemouth and Bridport. Most of the filming took place at the Freshwater Beach Holiday Park, near Bridport. According to Danny Stack, filming began on late August 2014 and wrapped up in October 2014.

== Release ==
The film premiered on 10 October 2015 at the 59th BFI London Film Festival. On 24 June 2016 TriCoast Entertainment released the film on premium VOD and digital platforms.

== Reception ==
Screen Daily was mixed in their opinion, closing their article with the statement "Nelson Nutmeg falls to pieces the moment you try and untangle the twist ending, suggesting that Clague and Stack may have rather underestimated the sophistication of their target audience." MuggleNet was more positive, writing "While a children’s film at its core, Who Killed Nelson Nutmeg? is thoroughly enjoyable for anyone, young or old."
