= White Chamber (film) =

2018 film directed by Paul Raschid

- Theatrical release poster
- Directed by: Paul Raschid
- Written by: Paul Raschid
- Produced by: Jonnie Hurn; Neville Raschid
- Starring: Shauna Macdonald; Oded Fehr
- Cinematography: Glen Warrillow
- Edited by: Alex Martin
- Music by: John Harle
- Production companies: Aviary Films; Dark Sky Films
- Distributed by: Dark Sky Films; Netflix
- Release dates: April 5, 2018 (Brussels); March 29, 2019 (United States)
- Running time: 89 minutes
- Country: United Kingdom
- Language: English

White Chamber is a 2018 British science-fiction horror film written and directed by Paul Raschid. It stars Shauna Macdonald and Oded Fehr. The film is about a woman, Dr. Elle Chrysler (Macdonald), who wakes up to find herself in a white chamber, where she is tortured for information that she claims to not have.

White Chamber premiered on 5 April 2018 at the Brussels International Fantastic Film Festival, and later at the 2018 Edinburgh Film Festival. The film was released for streaming on 29 March 2019 by Netflix. The film received mixed reviews, and Macdonald's performance received praise. She won the Scottish BAFTA Award for Best Actress for her performance.

== Premise ==
Dr. Elle Chrysler wakes up to find herself in a white chamber, where she is tortured for information that she claims to not have.

== Cast ==
- Shauna Macdonald as Dr. Elle Chrysler
- Oded Fehr as Daran / Narek Zakarian
- Amrita Acharia as Ruth
- Sharon Maughan as Sandra
- Nicholas Farrell as Dr. Edgar Chrysler
- Candis Nergaard as Anya

== Reception ==
On Rotten Tomatoes, the film has an approval rating of 43%, based on seven reviews. On Metacritic, the film has a weighted average score of 40 out of 100, based on 2 critics, indicating "mixed reviews".
