= Nails (2017 film) =

- Directed by: Dennis Bartok
- Written by: Dennis Bartok; Tom Abrams
- Produced by: Brendan McCarthy; John McDonnell
- Starring: Shauna Macdonald; Steve Wall; Ross Noble; Leah McNamara
- Cinematography: James Mather
- Edited by: John Walters; Chris Gill
- Music by: Ade Fenton
- Production company: Fantastic Films
- Release dates: 20 February 2017 (ADIFF); 16 June 2017
- Running time: 85 minutes
- Countries: United Kingdom; Ireland
- Language: English

Nails is a 2017 horror film directed by Dennis Bartok, who co-wrote it with Tom Abrams. Shauna Macdonald stars as a track coach who is paralyzed after a hit-and-run accident. Upon waking in the hospital, she is haunted by a ghost. It is an international co-production between the United Kingdom and Ireland. It premiered at the Audi Dublin International Film Festival in February and was released in the UK and Ireland on 16 June of the same year.

== Plot ==
Dana Milgrom, a track coach and fitness enthusiast, is struck by a hit-and-run driver while crossing the street. She briefly dies before being revived by paramedics. When she wakes in the hospital, her body is battered, her legs are paralyzed, and she is connected to a medical ventilator through a tracheal tube. Unable to speak, she is forced to use a speech synthesis program. Her husband Steve helps her adjust to the program and assures her that he will attempt to get her back home soon. That night, Dana believes someone has entered her room. The nurse assistant, Trevor, checks the room for her in the morning but says no patients from this wing could have wandered in. When Dana insists a man is harassing her, she is assigned psychiatrist Dr. Stengel. As Steve insists the hospital staff take better care of her, Dana's daughter, Gemma, explores the hospital, unaware that a ghostly figure has observed her.

After an incident in which her ventilator fails, the hospital is forced to take Dana's claims more seriously. Though doubting foul play, hospital director Elizabeth Leaming authorises CCTV cameras to be installed in Dana's room. The cameras do not capture the next attack, where the same ghostly figure attempts to kill Dana. Dana's frantic emergency calls summon Trevor. The ghost leaves when Trevor enters; though he says he saw nothing, he tells Leaming that he felt a presence. Dana researches the hospital's past, learning that an orderly, Eric Nilsson, murdered several children before committing suicide. Trevor claims ignorance of Nilsson and tells her to ask Dr. Stengel about the hospital's history. Stengel reveals that Nilsson, a troubled former patient, was hired as an orderly once he was discharged. Because he collected fingernails from the children's ward patients, he was given the nickname "Nails".

Dana becomes convinced that Nails's ghost is haunting her and that Steve is having an affair with a new athlete, Ashley. Steve believes Trevor to be responsible for Dana's attacks. Trevor himself is overworked. Though he helps her as he can, he exasperatedly tells her to seek help from her husband when Dana insists on being discharged from the hospital. Nails makes contact with Dana through her speech synthesis program, threatening to kill her. When she asks why he has targeted her, Nails carves an answer onto her body: "because I miss you". Separately, Trevor finds an old record for Dana under her maiden name. Dana is revealed to have been one of the child patients Nails tended. Trevor sees live video footage where Nails attacks him; Nails kills Trevor off-screen, then mocks and kills Leaming, who has attempted to call the police.

Ashley, who comes to the hospital to visit Dana with Steve and Gemma, is possessed by Nails and kills Steve. Knowing that Nails will attempt to kill everyone, Dana tells Gemma to leave without her. Gemma refuses and forces Dana to come with her. Dana, who has grown stronger and has been practicing breathing on her own, has Gemma pull out the tracheal tube and put her in a wheelchair. The two race to escape the hospital as Nails kills the few remaining staff members, including Dr. Stengel. To save Gemma, Dana sacrifices herself; Gemma suffers shock after seeing Nails murder Dana. Emergency workers attend to Gemma after she escapes the hospital. When they ask who is responsible, all she can tell them is that Nails killed everyone.

The final shot of the film shows Dana's hospital room with her laptop on the bed facing towards the camera. It slowly zooms into the laptop screen that is displaying Dana in her bed from the angle of one of her CCTV cameras. Then Nails, in living form, walks over to her bedside and clips her fingernails.

== Cast ==
- Shauna Macdonald as Dana Milgrom
- Steve Wall as Steve Milgrom
- Leah McNamara as Gemma Milgrom
- Ross Noble as Trevor
- Richard Foster-King as Eric Nilsson / Nails
- Robert O'Mahoney as Dr. Ron Stengel
- Charlotte Bradley as Elizabeth Leaming
- Muireann D'Arcy as Ashley

== Production ==
Director and co-writer Dennis Bartok was inspired by a news story he read. A male patient, after becoming paralyzed in a hit-and-run accident, had cameras installed in his hospital room, which captured evidence of someone tampering with his ventilator. Bartok did a gender swap and made the protagonist a track coach as a tribute to a friend who was murdered shortly after the first draft was written. The production company, Fantastic Films, had worked previously with Noble on Stitches. Noble, a comedian, was looking to take a dramatic role and wanted to avoid comedy. Shooting took place in Dublin.

== Release ==
Nails premiered at the Audi Dublin International Film Festival on 20 February 2017. It was released in the UK and Ireland on 16 June 2017.

== Reception ==
Rotten Tomatoes, a review aggregator, reports that 44% of 16 surveyed critics gave the film a positive review; the average rating is 4.7/10.

Aine O'Connor of the Sunday Independent rated it 2/5 stars and wrote that the good acting is not enough to offset the thin story. In his review for RTÉ, Paddy Kehoe rated it 1.5/5 stars and wrote that it "essentially follows the current Hollywood schlock-horror template", focusing on tech gadgets and jump scares instead of story. Kim Newman, writing in Empire, rated it 3/5 stars and called it predictable but effective, praising Macdonald's acting.
