= Before I Sleep (film) =

- Promotional poster
- Directed by: Aaron Sharff; Billy Sharff
- Screenplay by: Aaron Sharff; Billy Sharff
- Produced by: Aaron Sharff; Billy Sharff
- Starring: David Warner; Tom Sizemore; Bonnie Wright; Cynthia Gibb; Eric Roberts; Eugene Simon
- Cinematography: Matt Bucy
- Music by: Billy Sharff
- Production company: Elemental Cinema
- Release date: 19 October 2013 (Heartland Film Festival)
- Running time: 82 minutes
- Country: United States
- Language: English

Before I Sleep is a 2013 American drama film co-directed, written and produced by Aaron Sharff and Billy Sharff. The film features David Warner, Tom Sizemore, Bonnie Wright, Cynthia Gibb, Eric Roberts, Eugene Simon, Campbell Scott and Chevy Chase. It was formerly titled Shakespeare's Daughter. The film premiered in competition at the Heartland Film Festival on October 19, 2013. The film marks the final film appearance of James Rebhorn before his death.

== Synopsis ==
Eugene Devlin, a once famous, now reclusive poet, searches through his past, looking for redemption and peace.

== Cast ==
- David Warner as Eugene Devlin
  - Tanner Flood as Child Eugene Devlin
  - Eugene Simon as Eugene Devlin (age 20)
  - Campbell Scott as Eugene Devlin (age 48)
- Tom Sizemore as Randy
- Cynthia Gibb as Caroline
- Eric Roberts as David
- Chevy Chase as The Gravedigger
- Bonnie Wright as Phoebe
  - Clare Foley as Child Phoebe
- Sasha Spielberg as Rachel
- Jamie Bamber as Paul
- James Rebhorn as Priest
- Alice St. Clair as Zooey
- George Woodard as The Singer
- John Blyth Barrymore as The Pianist
- Rusty DeWees as Nurse
- Caley Chase as Geena
- Daniel Edwin Adams as Parishioner
- Eva Schiffman as Little Girl
- Chris Lamica as Second Worker

== Production ==
=== Development ===
Aaron and Billy wrote the screenplay for the film in 2011, about an old American poet named Eugene. Talking about the film they said that "(it is) an ensemble film that spans three major different times in Eugene's life." They further talked about the character of Eugene "His wife is dead, his daughter can't stand him, and he doesn't have many friends."

They also chose to shoot scenes at The Frost Place, the museum and former home of late American poet Robert Frost. They explained their reasons for filming at The Frost Place by saying that "The Frost Place was an exciting natural step because our main character is a poet and has many similarities to Frost, there's so much art and creativity in this area."

=== Casting ===
Talking about the casting Aaron and Billy said that they spend so much time on script that they knew exactly which actor they wanted for the particular role. They explained that "There was a feeling, when we got to casting we just knew who could and couldn't fit this or that role." David Warner was selected to play the role of older Eugene, the directors knew from the start that he was perfect for the role. Billy said about his casting that "David was amazing, to see in the space, among the woods in New England was incredible. Without him we wouldn't have this movie. Maybe he'll finally get knighted for this."

=== Filming ===
Filming was done in the New England region of the United States, starting on 22 June 2012, in Vermont, then later moving to Franconia, New Hampshire, and ended in August 2012.

== Promotion ==
On 10 June 2013 a few second clip of scene featuring Eugene Simon and Bonnie Wright was released online. In November 2014, first official trailer of the film was released.
