= Separate We Come, Separate We Go =

2012 film by Bonnie Wright

- Cannes Promotional Poster
- Directed by: Bonnie Wright
- Written by: Bonnie Wright
- Produced by: Rosalind Steven
- Starring: David Thewlis; Emily Dunham; Shauna Macdonald
- Cinematography: Arthur Loveday
- Edited by: Daisy Moseley
- Music by: Tom Recknell
- Production company: Bon Bon Lumiere
- Release date: 21 May 2012 (Cannes)
- Running time: 12 min
- Country: United Kingdom
- Language: English
- Budget: £5,000

Separate We Come, Separate We Go is a 2012 British coming-of-age drama short film written and directed by Bonnie Wright. It is Wright's directorial debut. The film had its world premiere at the 2012 Cannes Film Festival Short Film Corner on 21 May 2012 and screened at the BAFTA Graduate on 11 June 2012. It premiered in the United States at Gold Coast International Film Festival on 25 October 2013.

== Premise ==
Thea, a ten-year-old girl, lives with her mother in a town in East Sussex. One day while trailing the coast alone, she meets a man and becomes friends with him, starting a journey during which she finds possibilities she didn't know existed.

== Cast ==
- David Thewlis as Norman
- Emily Dunham as Thea
- Shauna Macdonald as The Mother

== Production ==
=== Development ===
Wright directed and wrote the screenplay for the film as a part of her graduation course at London College of Communication. Wright produced the film by her own production company, Bon Bon Lumiere, along with Rosalind Steven. Funding were also provided by a fish and chip shop located at Dungeness and Romney Marsh, where most of the filming took place, as London College of Communication rules state that films can be funded by voluntary donations only.

=== Filming ===
Filming took place at sparsely populated areas of Kent and East Sussex, including Dungeness, Romney Marsh, Lydd, Camber Sands, Rye Harbour, Winchelsea Beach and Dymchurch.

Talking about the filming locations Wright said that "I wanted to make something personal and I’ve spent a lot of time in Dungeness, because my parents have a house just down the coast from there, so it has a strong connection to my family. Also, I was always a massive fan of Derek Jarman and he spent his last years there. I just love the strangeness of it, the bleakness. The more I’ve been there, the more I fall in love with it." She also said that "Romney Marsh is an area where I spent a lot of time when I was a child. Growing up in a city such as London, it’s so confined sometimes that as a child there is no feeling of a horizon, there’s nothing beyond what you know. So for me I was so lucky to have that experience of spending a lot of time in open spaces such as Romney Marsh that I was able to gain that feeling of beyond. As a young child I was obsessed with horizons."

== Music ==
The score for Separate We Come, Separate We Go was composed by Tom Recknell, who composed the piece "The Birds".

== Reception ==
The film received positive reception from critics after its premiere at Cannes Film Festival. A review in the magazine Total Film described the film as "a rather sweet, very personal story about a little girl who meets lovely David Thewlis and learns to stretch her limitations." Nick de Semlyen of Empire praised Wright's direction, writing "it's an impressive first work from someone who clearly has ambition to burn."
