= Bonnie Wright =

English actress and filmmaker (born 1991)

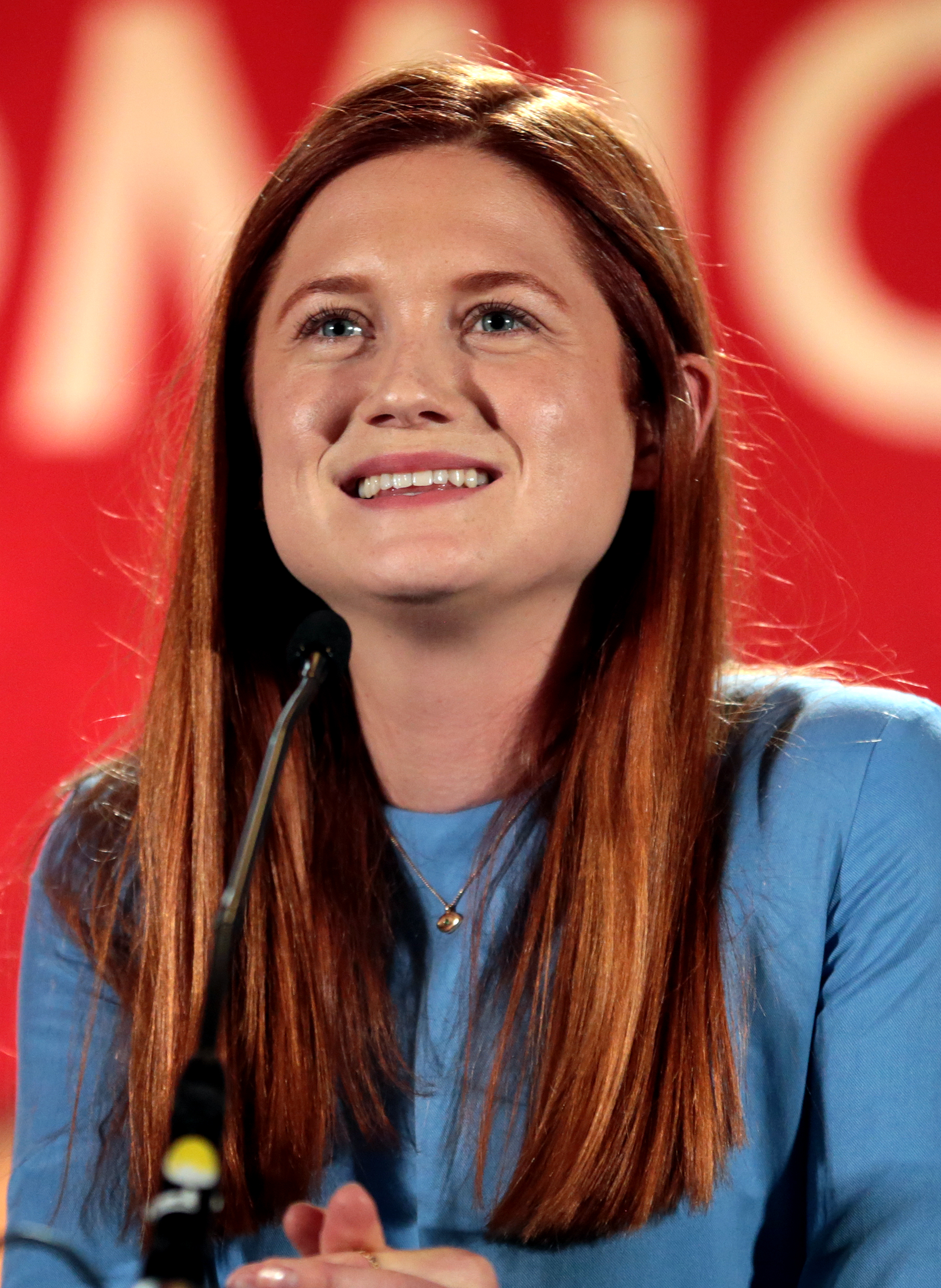
- Wright in 2017
- Born: Bonnie Francesca Wright; 17 February 1991 (age 35); London, England
- Education: London College of Communication (B.A.)
- Occupations: Actress; director; screenwriter; model; activist; author; YouTuber
- Years active: 2001–present
- Notable work: Harry Potter
- Spouse: Andrew Lococo (m. 2022)
- Partner: Jamie Campbell Bower (2009–2012)
- Children: 2

Bonnie Francesca Wright (born 17 February 1991) is an English actress, filmmaker, and environmental activist. She is best known for her role as Ginny Weasley in the Harry Potter film series.

Born in London, Wright made her professional acting debut in Harry Potter and the Philosopher's Stone (2001), playing Ginny Weasley for ten years through Harry Potter and the Deathly Hallows – Part 2 (2011). Subsequently, Wright appeared in a string of independent films, including Before I Sleep (2013), The Sea (2013), and After the Dark (2014); the films received mixed reviews. She made her stage debut as the lead in Peter Ustinov's The Moment of Truth at the Southwark Playhouse in 2013.

After graduating from the London College of Communication in 2012 with a Bachelor of Arts in filmmaking, Wright founded her own production company, BonBonLumiere, and began to produce short films. Her first directorial project was the coming-of-age drama Separate We Come, Separate We Go (2012), starring David Thewlis, which was released at the Cannes Film Festival to critical acclaim. She directed Know Thyself (2016), starring Christian Coulson, and Sextant (2016), both of which featured landscape and emotion as themes. Wright's three-part series, Phone Calls, premiered at the Tribeca Film Festival in 2017. She released Medusa's Ankles (2018) starring Kerry Fox and Jason Isaacs, based on A. S. Byatt's The Matisse Stories. She has also directed music videos for artists Sophie Lowe, Pete Yorn, and Scarlett Johansson.

Wright is an ambassador for the Rainforest Alliance as well as the charities Greenpeace and Lumos.

== Early life and education ==
Bonnie Francesca Wright was born on 17 February 1991 in the London Borough of Tower Hamlets, the second child of Sheila Teague and Gary Wright, owners of the jewellery company Wright & Teague. Wright was raised a Christian. She attended Prior Weston Primary School and later the independent King Alfred School in Golders Green, North London for her secondary education. While on set, Wright kept up with her studies with the help of a tutor, and attained three A-levels in art, photography and design technology.

She has stated that growing up on set contributed to her film knowledge and interest. During the filming of Harry Potter and the Deathly Hallows in 2009, she began attending the London College of Communication at University of the Arts London; in 2012, Wright graduated with a Bachelor of Arts degree in filmmaking.

== Career ==
=== 2001–2011: Beginnings and Harry Potter series ===
In 1999, castings were held across the UK for Harry Potter and the Philosopher's Stone, the film adaptation of British author J. K. Rowling's best-selling novel. Wright's elder brother had read the first two books in the series and informed her that she reminded him of Ginny Weasley. Wright did not have any prior professional experience aside from school plays, and asked her mother if she could audition "on a whim". She gained a screen test for David Heyman after her pictures were sent to the film's casting directors, and her parents were told she got the role shortly after. Wright made her film debut at the age of nine upon the 2001 release of Harry Potter and the Philosopher's Stone, appearing in a cameo role in a scene at London King's Cross railway station, where her character and mother meet Harry Potter during the boarding of the Hogwarts express. The film broke sales records and was the highest-grossing film of 2001. She reprised her role the following year in Harry Potter and the Chamber of Secrets, in which her character begins studies at Hogwarts and encounters a secret diary that begins to control her actions. One critic cited her role as "important" but "underdeveloped". The film broke the opening records of its predecessor and became the fifth-highest-grossing film of all time in the region.

In 2002 and 2004, Wright co-starred in two television films: Stranded (2002), a period piece, and Agatha Christie: A Life in Pictures (2004), where she played the younger version of the titular writer. Wright had supporting roles in the successive releases of Harry Potter and the Prisoner of Azkaban and Harry Potter and the Goblet of Fire, released in 2004 and 2005 to commercial success and increasing worldwide recognition.

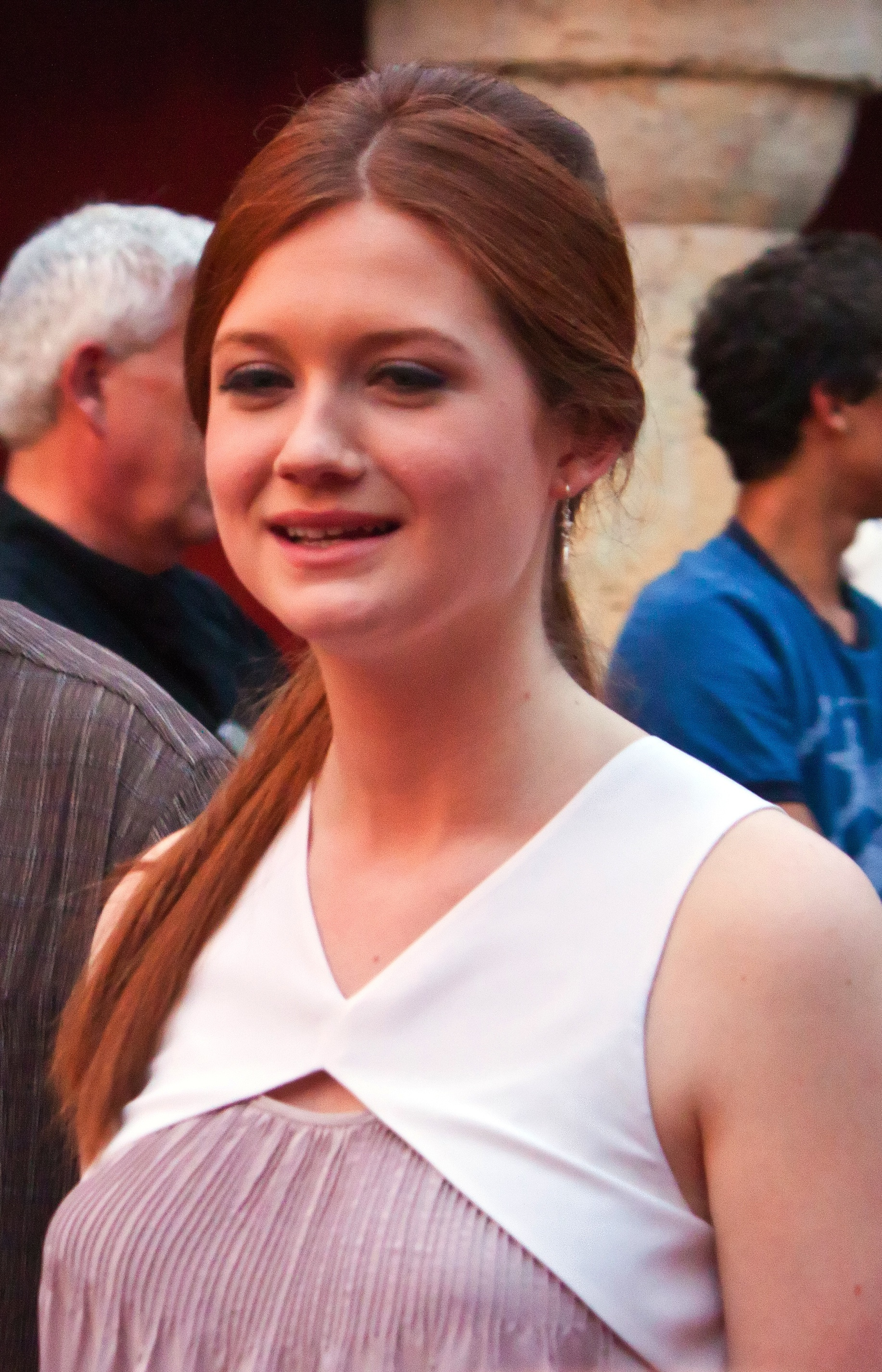
Wright at the opening of the Wizarding World of Harry Potter in 2010

As Ginny, she appeared more prominently in Harry Potter and the Order of the Phoenix (2007), joining Dumbledore's Army and eventually participating in the climactic scene, battling against Lord Voldemort and the Death Eaters. Mark Adams of The Sunday Mirror wrote that Wright's performance "makes the most subtle and memorable impact... her time is to come." The film was a critical and financial success, with a record-breaking opening weekend. In 2007, Wright guest starred on the Disney Channel's The Replacements, where she voiced Vanessa in the second-season premiere titled "London Calling". Harry Potter and the Half-Blood Prince was released in 2009. Wright's character continued to develop, becoming chaser for the Gryffindor Quidditch team as well as Harry Potter's love interest. Variety stated that her portrayal "intrigues as the sort of initial plain Jane who keeps growing on you".

In Harry Potter and the Deathly Hallows – Part 1 and Harry Potter and the Deathly Hallows – Part 2, Wright reprised her role for the final time, being featured during the film's prominent battle storyline and in the epilogue, set nineteen years later. Wright was nominated for an Empire Award for her performance in the final film. She has also provided the voice of Ginny in the video game versions of Harry Potter and the Order of the Phoenix, Harry Potter and the Half-Blood Prince, and Harry Potter and the Deathly Hallows – Part 1. Wright is one of the thirteen actors who have appeared in all eight films of the Harry Potter franchise, being part of the cast members Rowling referred to as "The Big Seven".

=== 2012–present: Independent films and directorial focus ===
In 2012, Wright founded her film production company, BonBonLumiere. That same year, Wright made her directorial and screenwriting debut in Separate We Come, Separate We Go, a coming-of-age short film starring Harry Potter co-star David Thewlis. The film premiered at the Cannes Film Festival in 2012 and the Gold Coast International Film Festival in 2013. Nick de Semlyen of Empire praised Wright's direction, saying that "it's an impressive first work from someone who clearly has ambition to burn."

In 2013, she co-starred in Before I Sleep alongside an ensemble cast. The film was shot in New England, and premiered at the 2013 Heartland Film Festival. She then appeared in The Sea (2013), an adaptation of the John Banville novel, playing Rose, a "fragile, distracted young nanny". The film premiered at the Edinburgh International Film Festival on 23 June 2013. The Sea received mixed reviews; one critic wrote that Wright was an "underused but ultimately ineffective screen presence". That same year, she also made her stage debut in the role of The Girl in Peter Ustinov's The Moment of Truth. The play was performed at the Southwark Playhouse in London from June to July. Wright received critical praise for her stage performance; the British Theatre Guide wrote she "makes clear in her performance, she is motivated by love for her father and movingly has to face rejection..." Wright filmed the comedy Those Who Wander and the family-adventure film Who Killed Nelson Nutmeg? in 2013. In December 2013, she directed Sophie Lowe in her music video "Dreaming". The video was shot in Joshua Tree National Park. In 2014, she took part in the third series of The Great Sport Relief Bake Off, winning the first episode and being named the "Star Baker".

"Doing such big films gave me a desire to get more out of film-making, to get deeper into the process. When you are acting you are observing so much happening around you. I am directing actors having been directed myself, and there is specific type of language you have that is so unique. If you've been on the other side of it, it's such a lovely experience."

— Wright reflecting on her transition from acting to directing

Wright starred alongside Rhys Wakefield, James D'Arcy and her Harry Potter co-star Freddie Stroma in the science fiction film After the Dark (2014), directed by John Huddles and filmed in Jakarta, Indonesia. She played Georgina, one of the students. The film premiered at Neuchâtel International Fantastic Film Festival on 7 July 2013. Reviews for After the Dark were mixed; The Village Voice commented that the film "slid[es] into a ... soapy backstory while suggesting that supporting actress Bonnie Wright might have been a stronger [..] lead". Wright voiced a character in the animated film My Dad Is Scrooge (2014). In May 2014, Wright wrote and directed short film Know Thyself, starring her Harry Potter co-star Christian Coulson. Know Thyself premiered at festival NewFilmmakers NY on 10 February 2016; Elle referred to the film as "emotive". In July 2014, Wright directed the short film Fade to Gold, showcasing her parents' creative design of their jewellery.

In August 2016, her company released the first instalment of Sextant, a twelve-part work with each short shot under a full moon, containing themes of cosmic order and poetry. Wright stated that she desired to shoot "when our sensitivities are heightened" and that the film reflected her interest in how a landscape can be "the catalyst..for self discovery". Wright's next directorial project was a three-episode series entitled Phone Calls, showing phone conversations with three pairs of people who never physically interact on-screen. Phone Calls premiered at the Tribeca Film Festival in April 2017. In June 2018, Wright released Medusa's Ankles, based on a section of The Matisse Stories by A. S. Byatt. The film was shot in Lincoln, England, and starred Kerry Fox as a woman experiencing a menopausal midlife crisis, alongside Harry Potter co-star Jason Isaacs as a charismatic, "self obsessed" hairdresser with whom she develops a fraught connection. Wright stated that in her direction, she tried to capture "the intimate experience" of going to a salon and experiencing sudden, personal change. Wright directed Lowe again in her music video for "Taught You How To Feel", released in November 2018. Wright also directed the music video for Pete Yorn and Scarlett Johansson's single, "Iguana Bird", an "expressive personification of heartbreak recovery", released in October 2018.

Wright's next video was for independent artist MAGUIRE, entitled "Fallible". It was released in June 2019; Fame Magazine called it a "breathtakingly candid portrait". In March 2020, Wright narrated an audiobook adaption of Babbitty Rabbitty and her Cackling Stump from The Tales of Beedle the Bard, an in-universe book of Wizarding World children's stories written by Rowling. The audiobook was released in aid of the charity Lumos.

== Other ventures ==
=== Activism ===
Wright is an active spokesperson for environmentalism and awareness of plastic pollution; she has stated, "Every piece of plastic I have ever used is still somewhere on this earth, and that's terrifying." In November 2017, she joined Greenpeace on their ship Arctic Sunrise, monitoring plastic waste in the oceans. In January 2018, she visited the Coca-Cola headquarters in Atlanta, Georgia, to deliver a petition to urge them to stop producing single-use plastic. She has previously held public discussions on how people can reduce single-use plastic usage and advocates for causes on her Instagram page.

In February 2020, Wright, as an ambassador of the Rainforest Alliance, travelled to Guatemala to meet communities that practice sustainable forest management in the Maya Biosphere Reserve. During the trip, she met staff in Uaxactun, a community that the Rainforest Alliance has been working with for more than 20 years to promote practices of sustainable forest management. She documented the trip through both the organization's and her personal social media pages.

In June 2020, she expressed support for transgender people in response to a series of tweets by J.K. Rowling involving the trans community.

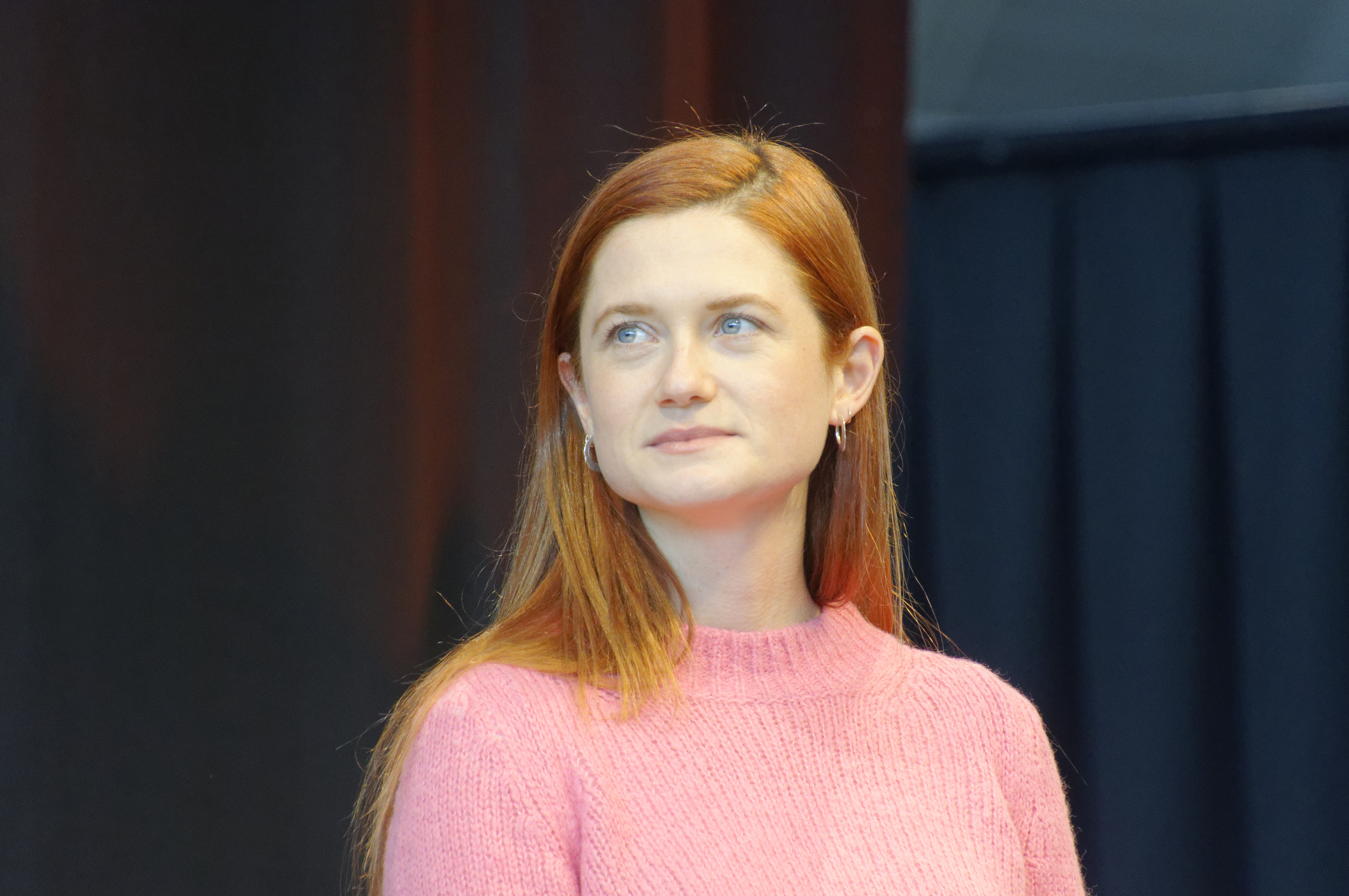
Wright speaking at Comic-Con Germany in 2021

Wright is also an ambassador for Lumos, a children's organization founded by Rowling in 2005. In 2016, Wright and fellow ambassador (and Harry Potter co-star) Evanna Lynch travelled to Haiti to learn about the 30,000 children living in orphanages, meeting with children who had been rescued from unstable conditions and reunited with their families. Wright has spoken extensively about Lumos's charity work, stating that she had "heard so much about the work that Lumos was doing [..] but this experience highlighted how incredibly important Lumos' work is in Haiti." In 2021, Wright, along with other Harry Potter co-stars Evanna Lynch, Mark Williams, and Devon Murray, attended the 2021 Stuttgart Comic Con, where they did meet-and-greets with fans.

In May 2021, during the 2021 Israel–Palestine crisis, Wright expressed support for Palestine by sharing a graphic, which stated, "What is happening in Palestine is not complicated; it’s settler colonialism and ethnic cleansing.”

In April 2022, Wright published a book, Go Gently: Actionable Steps to Nurture Yourself and the Planet.

In October 2023, Wright signed the Artists4Ceasefire open letter calling for a permanent ceasefire and delivery of aid during the Gaza war.

=== Modelling ===
In 2011, Wright appeared in a fashion spread for the Financial Times' luxury lifestyle magazine How to Spend It. The shoot took place at the Victoria and Albert Museum and paid homage to artist Dante Rossetti. She participated as a catwalk model for fashion designer Katie Eary at an Autumn/Winter 2011 show during London Fashion Week. In August 2013, Wright participated, along with Phoebe Collings James and Clara Paget, with jewellery designer Dominic Jones modelling southsea deckchairs in aid of the World Land Trust and Winchester School of Art charities.

== Personal life ==
Wright practices pescetarianism. She has lived in the Clerkenwell area of London and Los Angeles, and moved to San Diego in 2022. She was engaged to Harry Potter co-star Jamie Campbell Bower from April 2011 to June 2012.

On 20 March 2022, Wright confirmed on her Instagram account that she had married her long-time boyfriend, Andrew Lococo. On 28 April 2023, Wright revealed they were expecting their first child. On 19 September 2023, she gave birth to a boy. In April 2026, Wright revealed they were expecting their second child. In October 2026, Wright gave birth to another son.

== Filmography ==
=== Film ===
| Year | Title | Role | Notes |
|---|---|---|---|
| 2001 | Harry Potter and the Philosopher's Stone | Ginny Weasley | |
| 2002 | Harry Potter and the Chamber of Secrets | Ginny Weasley | |
| 2004 | Harry Potter and the Prisoner of Azkaban | Ginny Weasley | |
| 2005 | Harry Potter and the Goblet of Fire | Ginny Weasley | |
| 2007 | Harry Potter and the Order of the Phoenix | Ginny Weasley | |
| 2009 | Harry Potter and the Half-Blood Prince | Ginny Weasley | |
| 2010 | Harry Potter and the Deathly Hallows – Part 1 | Ginny Weasley | |
| 2011 | Harry Potter and the Deathly Hallows – Part 2 | Ginny Weasley | |
| 2013 | The Sea | Rose | |
| 2013 | After the Dark | Georgina | |
| 2013 | Before I Sleep | Phoebe | |
| 2014 | How (Not) to Rob a Train | Bonnie | |
| 2014 | My Dad Is Scrooge | Connie (voice) | |
| 2015 | Sweat | Mia | Short film |
| 2015 | Who Killed Nelson Nutmeg? | Diane | |
| 2018 | A Christmas Carol | Nell | |
| TBA | Those Who Wander | Zoe | Unreleased film |

=== Television ===
| Year | Title | Role | Notes |
|---|---|---|---|
| 2002 | Stranded | Young Sarah Robinson | Television film |
| 2004 | Agatha Christie: A Life in Pictures | Young Agatha Christie | Television film |
| 2007 | The Replacements | Vanessa (voice) | Episode: "London Calling" |
| 2022 | Harry Potter 20th Anniversary: Return to Hogwarts | Herself | Television special |
| 2024 | Harry Potter: Wizards of Baking | Herself/guest judge | Television game show |

=== Theatre ===
| Year | Title | Role | Notes |
|---|---|---|---|
| 2013 | The Moment of Truth | The Girl | Southwark Playhouse |

=== Video games ===
| Year | Game | Voice role | Notes |
|---|---|---|---|
| 2007 | Harry Potter and the Order of the Phoenix | Ginny Weasley | |
| 2009 | Harry Potter and the Half-Blood Prince | Ginny Weasley | |
| 2010 | Harry Potter and the Deathly Hallows – Part 1 | Ginny Weasley | |
| 2011 | Harry Potter and the Deathly Hallows – Part 2 | Ginny Weasley | |

=== Theme parks ===
| Year | Title | Voice role | Notes |
|---|---|---|---|
| 2010 | Harry Potter and the Forbidden Journey | Ginny Weasley | Theme park attraction; The Wizarding World of Harry Potter |

=== Director ===
| Year | Film | Role | Notes |
|---|---|---|---|
| 2012 | Separate We Come, Separate We Go | Writer and director, directorial debut | Premiered at the Cannes Film Festival short film corner |
| 2013 | Dreaming | Director | Music video |
| 2014 | Sea Ess | Director | Music video |
| 2014 | Know Thyself | Writer, director and producer | Short film, premiered at the New Film Makers New York at Anthology Film Archive in 2016 |
| 2014 | Fade to Gold | Director | Short film for LoveGold and Wright and Teague |
| 2018 | Medusa's Ankles | Director | Short film based on Medusa's Ankles by author A. S. Byatt |
| 2018 | Taught You How To Feel | Director | Music video |
| 2018 | Iguana Bird | Director | Music video |
| 2019 | Fallible | Director | Music video |
| 2021 | Melt | Director | Music video |

=== Screenwriter ===
| Year | Film | Role | Notes |
|---|---|---|---|
| 2012 | Separate We Come, Separate We Go | Screenwriter only, screenwriting debut | Premiered at the Cannes Film Festival short film corner |

=== Other roles ===
| Year | Title | Role | Notes |
|---|---|---|---|
| 2020 | Babbitty Rabbitty and her Cackling Stump | Narrator | Audiobook of The Tales of Beedle the Bard. |

=== Books ===
| Year published | Title | Notes |
|---|---|---|
| 2022 | Go Gently: Actionable Steps to Nurture Yourself and the Planet. OCLC 1256804563. | |

== Awards and nominations ==
Awards
| Year | Award | Category | Film | Result |
|---|---|---|---|---|
| 2011 | Rodial Beautiful Awards | Most Edgy Look Award | Harry Potter and the Deathly Hallows | Won |
| 2012 | Empire Award | Best Female Newcomer | Harry Potter and the Deathly Hallows – Part 2 | Nominated |

== See also ==
- List of Harry Potter films cast members
