= Seven Years in Tibet (disambiguation) =

Seven Years in Tibet may refer to:

== Book ==
- Seven Years in Tibet, an autobiographical travel book written by Austrian mountaineer Heinrich Harrer.

== Movies ==
- Seven Years in Tibet (1956 film), a British documentary film directed by Hans Nieter
- Seven Years in Tibet (1997 film), a film based on the book starring Brad Pitt

== Other ==
- "Seven Years in Tibet" (song), a single by David Bowie and Reeves Gabrels from the 1997 album Earthling
