= Jetsun Pema (born 1940) =

Tibetan minister and philanthropist

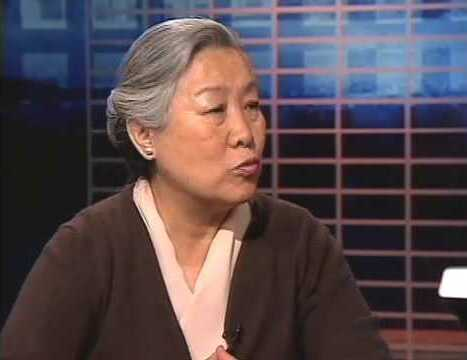
Jetsun Pema during an interview with Voice of America, 2009

Jetsun Pema (Tibetan: རྗེ་བཙུན་པདྨ་, Wylie: rje btsun padma; Chinese: 吉尊白瑪; born 7 July 1940) is the sister of the 14th Dalai Lama. For 42 years she was the president of the Tibetan Children's Villages (TCV) school system for Tibetan refugee students. She is also the president of the Tibetan National Football Association.

== Early life ==
Jetsun Pema was born in Lhasa, on 7 July 1940. She went to India in 1950 and studied first at St. Joseph's Convent in Kalimpong and later at Loreto Convent in Darjeeling from where she completed her Senior Cambridge in 1960. In 1961, she went to Switzerland and then to England to do further studies. She returned to India in April 1964.

== Career ==
At the behest of her elder brother, the 14th Dalai Lama, she became the president of the Tibetan Children's Villages (TCV), holding that position until her retirement in August 2006. She held this position for more than 42 years.

Because of her efforts, today TCV projects includes five Children's Villages with attached schools, seven Residential Schools, seven Day Schools, ten Day Care Centers, four Vocational Training Centers, four Youth Hostels, four Homes for the Elderly, and an outreach program for over 2,000 children in exile. All in all, the TCV oversees the well-being of more than 15,000 children and youths. In 1970, at the first General Body Meeting of the Tibetan Youth Congress, Jetsun Pema was elected as its vice president, and at the 1984 first General Body Meeting of the Tibetan Women's Association, she was elected as an adviser. In 1980, she was sent by the Dalai Lama to visit Tibet as the leader of the third Fact Finding Delegation and for three months traveled extensively all over the country. Jetsun Pema is also the governing body member of the Tibet House in New Delhi and the His Holiness the Dalai Lama Charitable Trust.

In May 1990, the Dalai Lama convened a special Congress of the Tibetan People-In-Exile in Dharamshala to elect the Kalöns (Ministers) of Central Tibetan Administration. Jetsun Pema was one of the three ministers elected and became the first Tibetan woman minister. In 1991, she was again elected by the Assembly of Tibetan People's Deputies (Tibetan Parliament) as one of the ministers and was allocated the portfolio of Minister-In-Charge of the Department of Tibetan Education. In July 1993, she resigned from the Kashag (Cabinet) and is today the president of the Tibetan Children's Villages. In 1995, the Assembly of Tibetan People's Deputies awarded her the title, "Mother of Tibet," in recognition of her dedication and service to Tibetan children. Jetsun Pema has traveled widely to speak about the Tibetans and her work at the Tibetan Children's Villages.

== Awards and honors ==
- 2018: Nari Shakti Puraskar-2017 by the Ministry of Women and Child Development, Government of India for outstanding contribution to women empowerment.
- 2014: The Mychkine Prize, awarded in a public ceremony in Germany. This is a special prize to honor recipients with exemplary work in the world of social commitment, art and techniques.
- 2014: Golden Scroll of Honor Award at the 13th Gr8 Women by BETI Foundation, Hyderabad, India
- 2013: Light of Education by the Tibetan Schools in Europe & Tibetan Community in Switzerland
- 2012: Honorary Doctorate, School of Education and School of Nursing & Health Profession, University of San Francisco USA
- 2011: Dayawati Modi Stree Shakti Award, Stree Shakti – The Parallel Force, India
- 2010: Human Rights Hero Award by "Associazione per i Diritti Umani e la Tolleranza" (Association for Human Rights and Tolerance), Italy
- 2008: Bharat Jyoti Award, The India International Friendship Society, India
- 2008: Honorary Citizenship, Italy
- 2006: Mothers of Earth Award, Gorvachov Foundation, Italy
- 2006: Melvin Jones Fellowship Award, Lions Club International Foundation, Italy
- 2006: World’s Children’s Honorary Award World's Children's Prize Foundation]] Mariefred, Sweden
- 2002: Women of Courage Award, National Association of Women Voters of Italy (The first Asian to receive this award)
- 2000: World's Children Honorary Award, World's Children's Prize, Mariefred, Sweden
- 2000: Maria Montessori Award, L’Amministrazione Comunale, Chiaravalle, Italy
- 1999: Medal of UNESCO in acknowledgement of selfless support and dedication to the cause of needy children
- 1995: Mother of Tibet Award, Assembly of Tibetan People’s Deputies (Parliament) in Exile.
- 1991: Dr. Hermann Gmeiner Medal
- 1984: Community Service Award, Assembly of Tibetan People’s Deputies (Parliament) in Exile.

== Cultural references ==
She wrote an autobiography in 1997, called Tibet: My Story. In the 1997 film Seven Years in Tibet, starring Brad Pitt and David Thewlis, a film based on the book by Heinrich Harrer, Jetsun Pema portrayed her real-life mother in the film as the mother of the young 14th Dalai Lama.

In the Nickelodeon series Avatar: The Legend of Korra, the wife of Korra's Airbending Master Tenzin is named "Pema", in honor of Jetsun Pema. Tenzin is himself named in honor of Jetsun Pema's brother the 14th Dalai Lama, whose spiritual name is Tenzin Gyatso.
