= Pema Rinzin =

Tibetan painter and artist

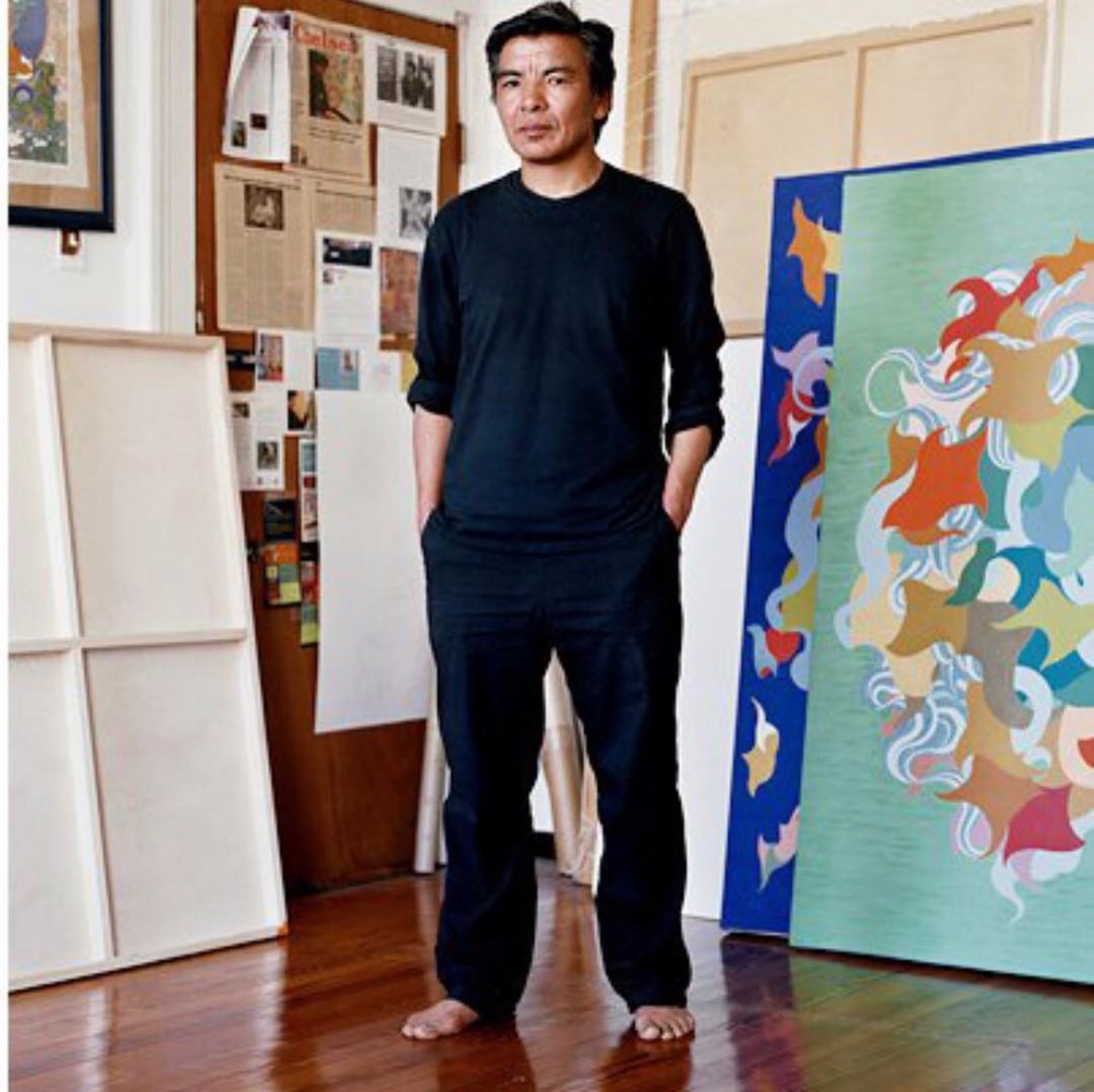
- Pema Rinzin at his studio in Brooklyn
- Born: 1966 (age 58–59); Dharamsala
- Occupation: Painter

Pema Rinzin Barotsang (born May 1966) is a Tibetan master of traditional Tibetan thangka painting and a contemporary abstract artist. He was the former Artist in Residence and a curator for the Rubin Museum of Art.

== Life and career ==
Born in the Tibetan exile community in India, Rinzin was raised in Dharamsala and educated in the Tibetan Children's Village from the age of two years old, having been given over to the organization by his mother. His parents were refugees who fled Tibet in the years following 1959.

In 1979 at the age of 13, Rinzin began his apprenticeship as a student of traditional Tibetan thangka painting under the tutelage of Tibetan artists including Kalsang Lodro Oshoe, Khepa Gonpo, and Rigdzin Paljor. He received his certificate of mastery in 1983 at age 18, receiving the title of "Best Thangka Painter" of that year's cohort. From 1984 to 1992, he taught Western Art History and Tibetan Art for the Lower Tibetan Children's Village School in Dharamsala.

In 1989, Rinzin traveled to the United States while lecturing about Tibetan art at universities and schools. Rinzin acted as an interpreter for a group of monks touring with the Grateful Dead.

In 1990 he returned to Dharamsala to resume his study of Tibetan art with his teacher Kalsang Lodro Oshoe. Here he met Yumyo Miyasaka, a Japanese student of Tibetan art whom he would later collaborate with. In July 1996 Rinzin, Kalsang, and Miyasaka traveled to Shoko-ji Cultural Research Institute in Okaya, Japan, where Miyasaka's elder brother Yukyo had become an abbot in 1994. The elder Miyasaka made Rinzin an artist-in-residence at the Institute to paint a series of large thangkas, and when Kalsang left Japan in 1997, Rinzin and Miyasaka continued the project which lasted for eight years. In this major project, Rinzin painted two sets of paintings: the first of the Eight Great Bodhisattvas and the second depicting Buddha's Biography, as well as a Wheel of Life and Cakrasamvara. During this time Rinzin and Miyasaka also co-illustrated a book of illustrations of the eighty-four Mahasiddhas titled Life and Legends of the Eighty-Four Mahasiddhas published by Shinju Publishing in Japan.

During this period from 1996 to 2004, Rinzin divided his time between Japan and Wurzburg, Germany, where several of his solo art shows were exhibited. He was the artist-in-residence at the Brush & Color Studio for three years. Additionally, he founded a local Tibetan song group called Yangchen.

From 2005 to 2008, Rinzin was invited to New York to become the first Artist in Residence for the Rubin Museum of Art. At the Rubin, Rinzin painted several artworks featured in their exhibitions, including the Four Great Guardian Kings mural, and lectured on Tibetan art.

In 2007, Rinzin founded the New York Tibetan Art Studio to teach traditional Tibetan painting. Since then he has shifted away from traditional Tibetan Buddhist art in his work to focus on contemporary art. Since 2011 he has been represented by the Joshua Liner Gallery in Chelsea, NY. He is currently based in Brooklyn.

== Gallery ==
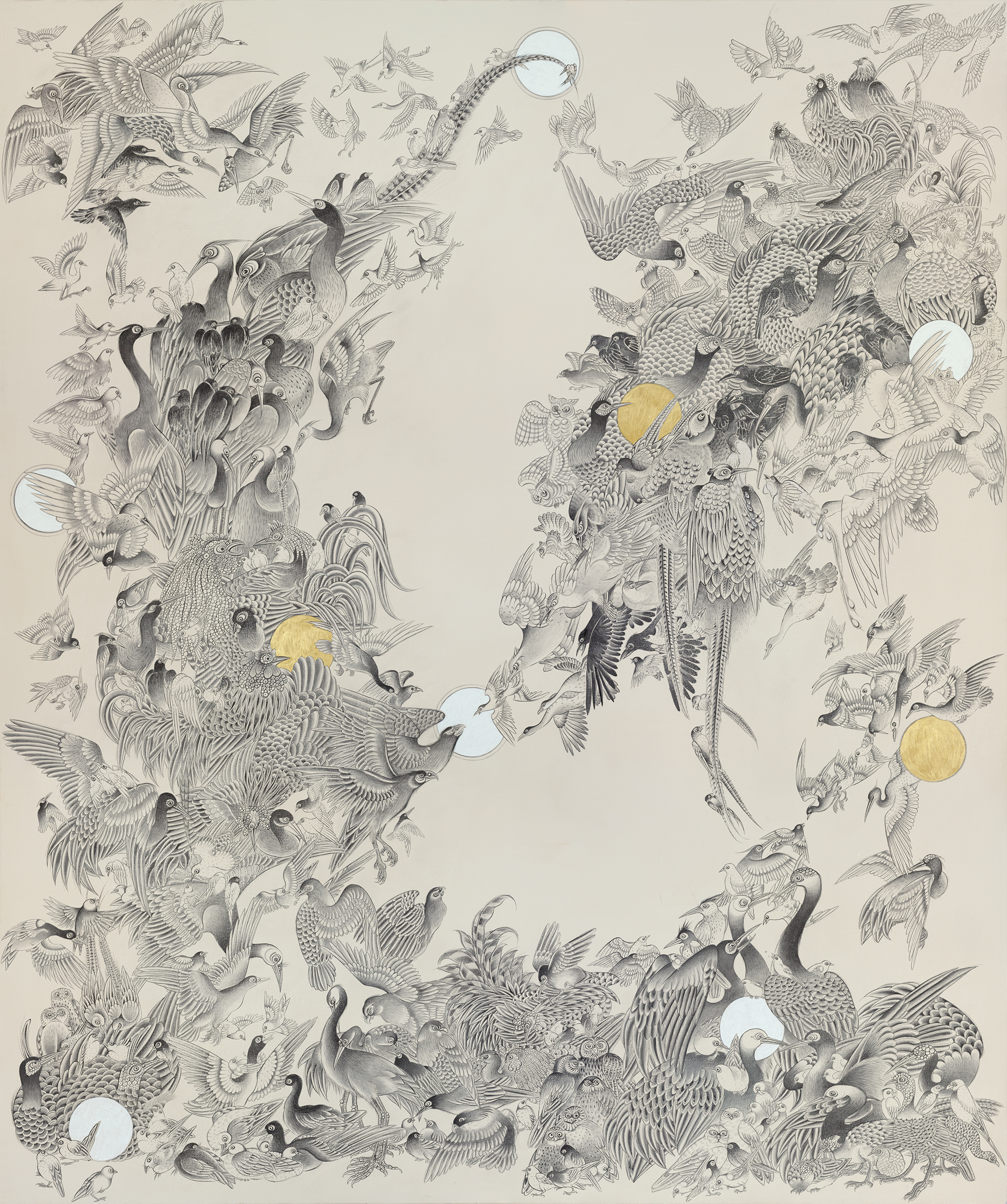
Wings of Joy by Pema Rinzin

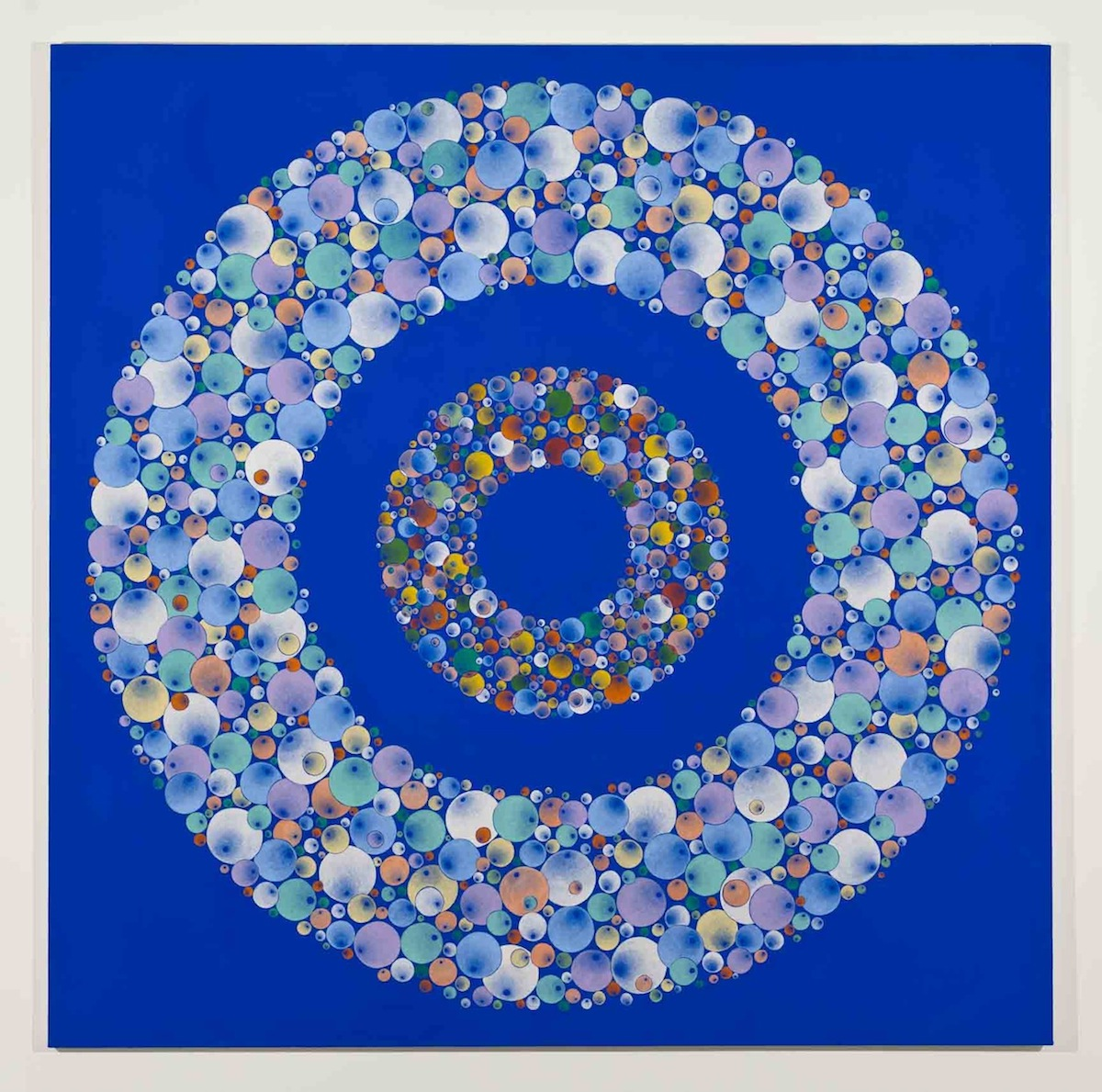
Bubble of Wishful Gems by Pema Rinzin

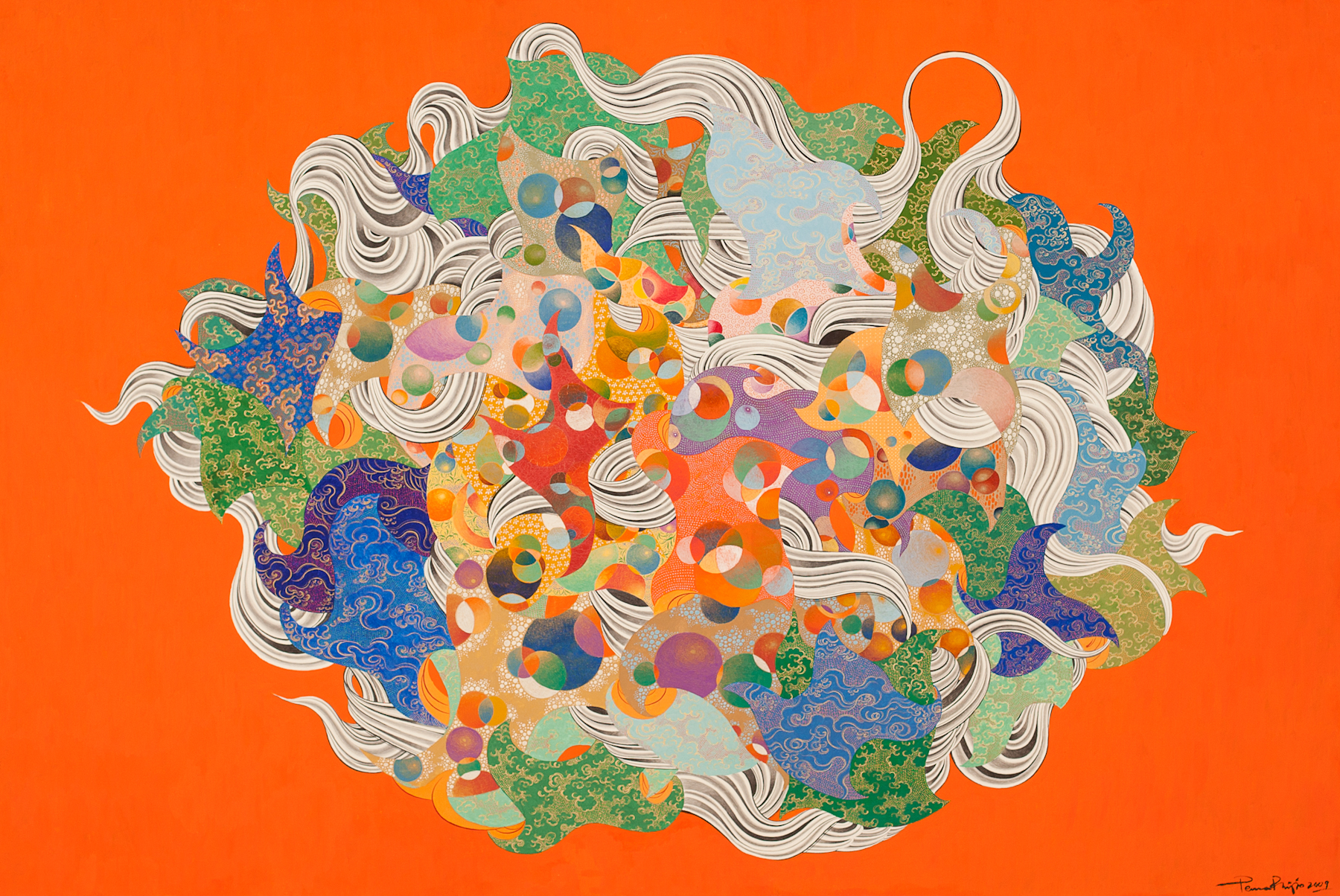
Peace and Energy (Orange) by Pema Rinzin

== See also ==
- Tibetan art
