= Peter Aufschnaiter =

Austrian mountaineer (1900–1973)

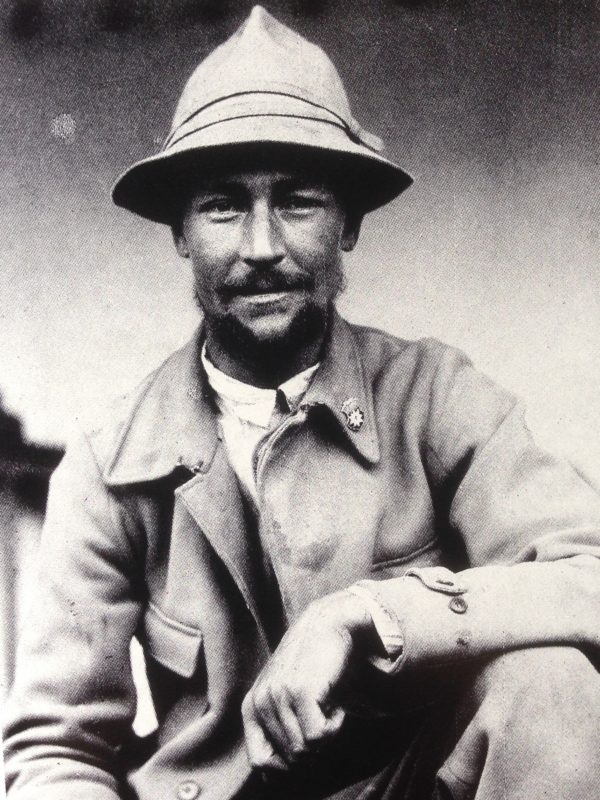
- Born: 2 November 1899; Kitzbühel, Tyrol, Austria-Hungary
- Died: 12 October 1973 (aged 73); Innsbruck, Austria
- Occupations: Mountaineer, agricultural scientist, geographer, cartographer

Peter Aufschnaiter (2 November 1899 – 12 October 1973) was an Austrian mountaineer, agricultural scientist, geographer and cartographer. His experiences with fellow climber Heinrich Harrer during World War II were depicted in the 1997 film Seven Years in Tibet.

== Early life ==
Born in Kitzbühel, Austria-Hungary, Peter Aufschnaiter attended high school in Kufstein. During his school education he was drafted into military service in the First World War in 1917. After he finished his final exams in 1919 he went to Munich in Germany to study agriculture.

=== Climbing ===
In his early years he began climbing in his beloved Kaiser mountain range; later, in Munich, Aufschnaiter became acquainted with several German alpinists of the time. He took part in expeditions to Kangchenjunga (1929 and 1931) in Sikkim, where he reached a height of 7,700 m (25,300 ft). On these expeditions he had first contacts with Tibetans and learned the Tibetan language.

=== Nazi Party ===
After the Machtergreifung of 30 January 1933, he joined the Nazi Party. From 1936 he worked full-time for the German Himalaya Foundation established that year by Paul Bauer.

== Capture and Tibet ==
After several attempts at the Nanga Parbat, Aufschnaiter led a small four-man expedition in 1939, including Heinrich Harrer, to the Diamir Face with the aim of finding an easier route to the peak. Having concluded that the face was viable, they were in Karachi at the end of August waiting for a freighter to take them home. The ship being long overdue, Harrer, Ludwig and Lobenhoffer tried to reach Persia with their shaky car, but several hundred kilometers northwest of Karachi they were detained by British colonial authorities and escorted back to Karachi, where Aufschnaiter had stayed on.

Two days later, war was declared and on 3 September 1939, all were put behind barbed wire to be transferred to a detention camp at Ahmednagar near Bombay two weeks later. They considered escaping to Portuguese Goa, but when further transferred to Dehradun, they found Tibet more promising. Their goal was to reach the Japanese front in Burma or China.

Aufschnaiter and Harrer escaped and were re-captured a number of times before finally succeeding. On 29 April 1944 after lunch a group of seven, Rolf Magener and Heins von Have disguised as British officers, Harrer, Aufschnaiter, the Salzburger Bruno Treipel (aka Treipl) and the Berliners Hans Kopp and Sattler, disguised as native Indian workers, walked out of the camp. While Magener and von Have took the train to Calcutta and from there found their way to the Japanese army in Burma, the others headed for the closest border. After Sattler had given up on 10 May, the remaining four entered Tibet crossing the Tsang Chok-la Pass (5,896 metres) on 17 May 1944 and thereafter split into two pairs: Harrer and Kopp; Aufschnaiter and Treipel. On 17 June Treipel, exhausted, bought himself a horse and rode back to the lowlands. Several months later, when the remaining three were still without visas for Tibet, Kopp gave up too and left for Nepal (where he was handed over to the British within a few days).

Aufschnaiter and Harrer, helped by the former's knowledge of the Tibetan language, proceeded to the capital of Lhasa which they reached on 15 January 1946, having crossed Western Tibet (passing the sacred Mount Kailash), the South-West with Gyirong County and the Northern Changthang Plateau.

From then on Aufschnaiter played a collabrorative role in Tibet. Employed by the government he helped plan a hydroelectric power plant and a sewage system for Lhasa and started first attempts at river regulations and reforestation in the area. He also looked into improving the quality of seeds. With Harrer he charted the first exact map of the capital city. His archaeological findings led to a correspondence with the scholar Giuseppe Tucci. His work is described in Heinrich Harrer's Seven Years in Tibet and Harrer's autobiography Beyond Seven Years in Tibet: my life before, during and after. Aufschnaiter's own book, Eight Years in Tibet, includes many of his own photographs and sketches.

In October 1950 the advance of the Chinese People's Liberation Army to Lhasa forced Aufschnaiter and Harrer to join the caravan of the Dalai Lama when he retreated to the Chumbi Valley bordering Sikkim and India. Harrer proceeded to India, but Aufschnaiter stayed at Gyantse and left Tibet only 10 months later. Harrer's book, Seven years in Tibet states that, "On 20 December 1950, Peter left Lhasa. Heinrich Harrer had already left for southern Tibet in the middle of November, finally leaving the country in March 1951. But Aufschnaiter wanted to stay in Tibet as long as possible, and in fact remained another ten months. (...) at this time he was on the south-western frontier of Tibet. On the way there he visited the monastery of Rongphu, which the Chinese had not yet destroyed, and from there climbed, alone, as far as No. 1 camp on the northern ascent route to Everest."

He arrived in Nepal in 1952 where he worked as a cartographer and then in New Delhi, for the Indian Army. In 1955, he first-ascended Ronti (6063 m) in the Garhwal Himalayas, together with Canadian George Hampson in pure alpine style. He eventually obtained a Nepalese passport which allowed him access to many restricted remote areas and he discovered valuable early Buddhist wall paintings. Aufschnaiter spent most of his remaining years in Nepal, working as an agricultural engineer. At first he worked for Swiss Technical Aid. From 1956 on he held a position as an agriculture expert for the United Nations Food and Agriculture Organization.

== Death ==
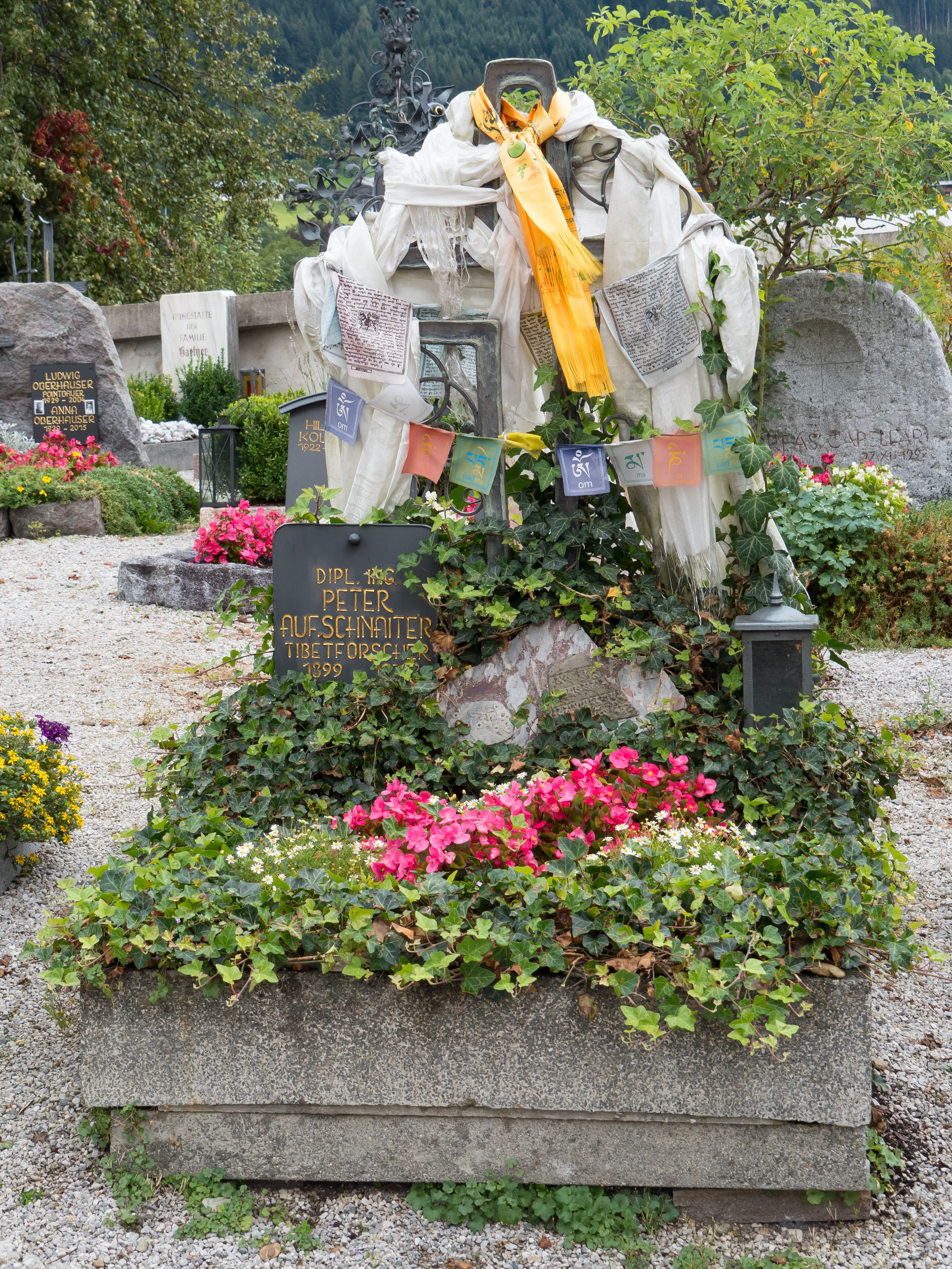
Aufschnaiter's grave in Kitzbühel, Austria

Aufschnaiter returned to Austria much later in life and died in Innsbruck in 1973 at the age of 73. He is buried at Kitzbüheler Bergfriedhof, Austria. Only very late in his life, the introverted Aufschnaiter began writing memoirs but did not see them published. After his death, the manuscript was first in the possession of mountaineer Paul Bauer. Finally it was edited and published by Tibet scholar Martin Brauen of the Museum of Ethnology at the University of Zurich.

== Fiction ==
In the 1997 film Seven Years in Tibet, Aufschnaiter is portrayed by David Thewlis. In the film, he falls in love while in Lhasa with the local tailor Pema Lhaki, and marries her.

== See also ==
- List of climbers, alpinists and mountaineers
- List of Austrian mountaineers
- List of Austrians
- Heinrich Harrer
- Seven Years in Tibet (book by Heinrich Harrer)
- Lhasa
- Tenzin Gyatso, 14th Dalai Lama
