= Honeygiver Among the Dogs =

2016 film

- Directed by: Dechen Roder
- Written by: Dechen Roder
- Produced by: Dechen Roder; Esther Koo
- Starring: Jamyang Jamtsho Wangchuk; Sonam Tashi Choden
- Cinematography: Jigme T. Tenzing
- Edited by: Dechen Roder
- Music by: Tashi Dorji
- Release date: 7 October 2016 (Busan IFF)
- Running time: 132 minutes
- Country: Bhutan
- Language: Dzongkha

Honeygiver Among the Dogs is a 2016 Bhutanese mystery film directed by Dechen Roder. It was screened in the Panorama section of the 67th Berlin International Film Festival.

== Plot ==
Kinley arrives in a small village to investigate the disappearance and death of the abbess of the local nunnery. His number one suspect is a woman named Choden, and once word gets out, Jampa, a young girl runs to warn Choden. The locals tell Kinsley that Choden is a demoness and brings the village bad luck, but she has gone missing. The police chief instructs Kinley to go undercover, search for her, and try to obtain information. The next day Jampa surprises Kinley by telling him the bus that Choden will be traveling on.

Kinley dresses in plain clothes and boards the same bus as Choden. At a rest stop she approaches him, noticing that he's also riding alone. She asks him to accompany her on foot to their destination, pretending to be her husband, because there are people after her. The two of them spend days trekking through the jungle. Choden deflects Kinley's questions by telling fantastical parables: a nun who doesn't stop meditating when stones are thrown at her; an abbess who protects her nuns from an invasion by transforming them into pigs; an abbess who continued meditating after her death and transformed into a rainbow.

The two end up staying in Kinley's house, and he must hide all evidence that he is a police officer. Just when they are starting to form a connection, Choden leaves without a word. Kinley's chief accuses the officer of developing romantic feelings for her, and instructs him to stop investigating. Kinley ignores that command, of course. He discovers that the missing abbess' nunnery is sitting on a valuable mineral deposit, and questions Norbu, the geologist who made the discovery, but he has a rock-solid alibi. Kinley runs into Choden on the street, and discovers that the abbess is still alive, in hiding. He tries to track down the doctor who treated the geologist, but the hospital records had been destroyed. He finally makes the connection when he hears a doctor with the same cell ringtone that was heard at the crime scene.

Choden sets up a time to meet with the doctor, and Kinley alerts the chief so that he can show up to arrest them. Kinley realizes that the chief is conspiring with the doctor to obtain the land deed to the nunnery. He shows up to rescue Choden, but they both get knocked unconscious. Choden reveals that the land deed everyone had been looking for had been sewn into the seam of Kinley's clothes the entire time. Choden once again disappears, and Kinley returns to the village. He learns that the abbess had just died. When he goes to see the body, the nuns tell him that she had actually died two years prior, but had asked them to keep it a secret, and that her body had turned into a rainbow.

== Cast ==
- Jamyang Jamtsho Wangchuk as Kinley
- Sonam Tashi Choden as Choden
- Kunga T. Dorji as Chief Wangdi
- Cencho Dorji as Norbu
- Deki Yangchen as Jampa

== Production ==
Roder has said that she was inspired by the dakini stories her mother told her as a girl, and she decided to make the film when she realized that these types of stories were starting to become lost to history.

== Reception ==
The film was screened at the 2017 Fribourg International Film Festival, where it won a Special Jury Prize, the Comundo Youth jury prize, and a Special Mention by the International Federation of Film Clubs. Clarence Tsui of the Hollywood Reporter called the film "beautiful and inventive" and added, "a genre long associated with sex and sleaze, film noir receives a surprisingly spiritual and feminine reworking". James Marsh of the South China Morning Post described Honeygiver as "one of the most original crime thrillers in recent memory". Critic Prathap Nair described the movie as "a genre-bending work, blending elements of neo-noir with Bhutanese mysticism."
