= Valentine Park =

British television sitcom series

- Genre: Sitcom
- Created by: Glen Cardno; Nicholas Hyde
- Written by: Various
- Directed by: Nic Phillips (Series 1); John Woods (Series 2)
- Starring: Ken Jones; David Thewlis; Daniel Peacock; Liz Smith
- Theme music composer: Philip Bird
- Country of origin: United Kingdom
- Original language: English
- No. of series: 2
- No. of episodes: 12

Production
- Executive producer: Jon Scoffield
- Producer: Glen Cardno
- Production locations: London, England, UK
- Running time: 30 minutes
- Production company: Central Independent Television

Original release
- Network: ITV
- Release: 19 June 1987 – 26 August 1988

Valentine Park is a British sitcom series created by Glen Cardno and Nicholas Hyde which ran for two series between 19 June 1987 and 26 August 1988 on the ITV network. The series focuses on the comedic, often chaotic daily life of a park staff, featuring Tom (Ken Jones) and his run-ins with a new, strict boss, alongside eccentric staff member Mrs. Giles, played by Liz Smith. It was produced by Central Independent Television.

== Plot ==
A rather curious sitcom. There was nothing wrong with the cast - Ken Jones, Liz Smith and Danny Peacock were involved - but the humour was roundly criticised for being juvenile. Sure enough, when LWT brought it back for a second series, it went out in a children's time-slot, Fridays at 5.15pm, albeit in school-holiday time.

Jones was cast as Tom, the head gardener in a large public park, proud of his marigolds but saddened to see that the park has a new employee, his errant godson Max (David Thewlis). Also working there are two laddish young men, Bodie (Daniel Peacock) and Doyle (Bernard Padden), who - as their names suggest - like to think of themselves as players in The Professionals, and, as the park's security officers, have the licence to behave accordingly. Max, who boards with the mad landlady Mrs Giles (Liz Smith), falls in love with Claire (Katy Newell), who lives with her irrational mother Maggie (played by Penny Morrell, real-life wife of George Cole).

Valentine Park was co-created and the first series was co-written by Nicholas Hyde, a 30 year-old public parks gardener from Kent with no previous writing experience.

== Cast ==
- Ken Jones as Tom
- David Thewlis as Max
- Daniel Peacock as Bodie
- Liz Smith as Mrs. Giles
- Katy Newell as Claire
- Penny Morrell as Maggie
- Bernard Padden as Doyle (Series 1)
- Kenneth Farrington as Philip (Series 2)
- Ellis Dale as Gordon Smackley (Series 2)

== Episodes ==
=== Series overview ===
Series	Episodes	Originally released	
Series	Episodes	First released	Last released
1	6	19 June 1987	24 July 1987
2	6	22 July 1988	26 August 1988

=== Series 1 (1987) ===
No.	Title	Directed by	Written by	Original release date
1	"Episode 1"	Nic Phillips	Glen Cardno; Nicholas Hyde	19 June 1987
2	"Episode 2"	Nic Phillips	Glen Cardno; Nicholas Hyde	26 June 1987
3	"Episode 3"	Nic Phillips	Glen Cardno; Nicholas Hyde	3 July 1987
4	"Episode 4"	Nic Phillips	Glen Cardno; Nicholas Hyde	10 July 1987
5	"Episode 5"	Nic Phillips	Glen Cardno; Nicholas Hyde	17 July 1987
6	"Episode 6"	Nic Phillips	Glen Cardno; Nicholas Hyde	24 July 1987

=== Series 2 (1988) ===
No.	Title	Directed by	Written by	Original release date
7	"No Particular Place to Go"	John Woods	Ian Whitham	22 July 1988
8	"Where Have All the Flowers Gone?"	John Woods	Geoff Rowley	29 July 1988
9	"Who's Minding the Marigolds?"	John Woods	Ian Whitham	5 August 1988
10	"A Rose by Any Other Name"	John Woods	Richard Sparks; Niall Clark	12 August 1988
11	"Heroes and Villains"	John Woods	Geoff Rowley	19 August 1988
12	"Swarm!"	John Woods	Richard Sparks; Niall Clark	26 August 1988
