= The Late Hector Kipling =

2007 novel by David Thewlis

- First edition cover
- Author: David Thewlis
- Publisher: Picador
- Publication date: September 4, 2007
- ISBN: 978-0-330-37336-4

The Late Hector Kipling is a 2007 novel by English actor David Thewlis. The book was released in the UK in hardback on September 7, 2007 and released on paperback July 4, 2008. In the US the book was released November 6, 2007.

== Plot summary ==
Hector Kipling is an artist who is famous for his oversized paintings of big heads. When one of his closest friends is found to have a brain tumor, Hector finds himself longing for someone close to him to die, as being the one left behind would make him the subject of sympathy.

Hector's girlfriend Eleni leaves for her native Greece after her mother is injured in a kitchen accident. Meanwhile, his own father has ended up in hospital as well: the money his mother spent on a replacement settee, after Eleni and Hector stained the old one during sex, is too much for him to handle.

At an exhibition, an assailant named Monger badly damages one of Hector's paintings. To make up for the damage, Monger will buy an expensive settee from Hector's parents to get his father out of hospital. He does so, but also robs Hector's parents of £15,000 and kills their pet dog.

Eleni returns home to tell Hector that her mother has died, but leaves in anger after she finds him with an American punk poet named Rosa Flood. Monger ends up killing Rosa and Lenny Snook, one of Hector's friends. Hector shoots Monger with the latter's gun and heads for the Tate Britain, where he paints the words "The simplest act of surrealism is to walk into a crowded street with a loaded revolver, and open the fire at random." He then does just that.

After his arrest, Hector is charged with killing Rosa and Lenny, but has decided to let it go. His father dies in hospital upon hearing of his son's deeds, and his mother commits suicide by throwing herself into the Irish Sea. He never hears from Eleni again.
