= Jamyang Jamtsho Wangchuk =

Bhutanese actor and film producer

- Born: 1982 (age 43–44); Bhutan
- Occupations: Actor, filmmaker, adventurer
- Notable work: Seven Years in Tibet (as the 14-year-old Dalai Lama)
- Awards: Nominated for YoungStar Award

Jamyang Jamtsho Wangchuk is a Bhutanese actor and filmmaker and an adventurer. He was born in 1982 to an army captain and a teacher. Growing up in remote Bhutan, he was able to nurture his love for the natural world. Today he advocates for the environment.

He is known for his role as the 14-year-old Dalai Lama in the movie Seven Years in Tibet. For this role he was nominated for the YoungStar Award, presented by The Hollywood Reporter. His younger brother Sonam starred in the role of the 8-year-old Dalai Lama.

After quitting law school, he worked as a tour guide for years before studying film producing in 2017 at the inaugural Busan Asian Film School in South Korea. A year later, he wrote and directed his first short film, The Open Door, which premiered at Locarno Film Festival and won an award at the Seoul International Senior Film Festival.

Currently, Jamtsho is cycling across the world for a campaign, 'The Messenger - Ride for Action!' to raise awareness on climate change issues. Carrying with him a collection of letters written by children that are addressed to the world leaders and a bottle of glacial meltwater, symbolizing the impact of the climate crisis on the dying Himalayan glaciers that will impact a quarter of humanity.

== Filmography ==
Actor:

- 1997: Seven Years in Tibet
- 2013, 2015 (re-edited): Gyalsey – The Legacy of a Prince
- 2016 Honeygiver Among the Dogs

Producer:

- 2013, 2015 (re-edited): Gyalsey – The Legacy of a Prince

Music:

- 2004: What Remains of Us (alternative title: Ce Qu'il Reste de Nous)
