= Thomas Rajna =

British pianist (1928–2021)

Thomas Rajna (21 December 1928 – 16 July 2021) was a British pianist and composer of Hungarian birth. He had been domiciled in Cape Town in South Africa since 1970.

== Biography ==
Rajna was born in Budapest, Hungary. He started to play the piano and compose at an early age and studied at the Franz Liszt Academy of Music where he won the Liszt Prize in 1947. That year he left Hungary to settle in London and enrolled at the Royal College of Music. He soon appeared at the Proms under such conductors as Carlo Maria Giulini, Colin Davis and John Pritchard, also becoming a frequent broadcaster at the BBC. In 1963 he was appointed Professor of Piano at the Guildhall School of Music and Drama.

His first commercial recording was the complete piano solo works of Igor Stravinsky. After that he recorded music by Alexander Scriabin, Robert Schumann and Olivier Messiaen, the piano part of Igor Stravinsky's Petrushka with the New Philharmonia under Erich Leinsdorf, and Béla Bartók's Music for Strings, Percussion and Celesta with Sir Georg Solti and the London Symphony Orchestra. He completed a cycle of recordings devoted to the entire piano music of Enrique Granados. Subsequently he undertook to record Franz Liszt's 12 Transcendental Etudes and 12 Etudes, Op. 1. Rajna often performed his own two piano concertos.

He settled with his family in Cape Town, South Africa in 1970 to take up an appointment at the Faculty of Music of the University of Cape Town (UCT), where he became associate professor of piano in 1989. In January 1981 he was awarded a University Fellowship by UCT and the same year received an Artes Award from the South African Broadcasting Corporation (SABC) for his series of radio programmes on Franz Liszt, entitled "A Lisztian Metamorphosis". He completed his Piano Concerto No. 2 in 1984. The following year he received a doctorate in music from UCT in recognition of his body of compositions.

During a 1990 visit to England he recorded the Schumann Piano Concerto with the BBC Philharmonic Orchestra and gave a recital of works by Ernő Dohnányi and himself. During the same year Rajna played the solo piano part in the first, and so far the only South African performance of Messiaen's monumental Turangalîla-Symphonie with the Cape Town Symphony Orchestra. His 1990 Harp Concerto had its European première in Copenhagen at the Fifth World Harp Congress in July 1993. This work and his Second Piano Concerto (with Rajna as soloist) were recorded by the National Symphony Orchestra of the SABC and released on CD in 1993. At the end of that year he retired from his post at the UCT College of Music.

His very first commercial recording, Stravinsky's complete solo piano works, which Rajna recorded in 1963, and which had been unavailable for 30 years, re-entered international circulation after the Dutch label, Emergo Classics, released their digitally remastered version in their Saga Classics series in 1993. In 1994 he completed Video Games for Orchestra and his opera Amarantha. The former Foundation for the Creative Arts commissioned these works as well as the Rhapsody for Clarinet and Orchestra (1995), premièred by Robert Pickup, the NSO and Richard Cock in 1996. In the same year Rajna was a recipient of the UCT Book Award for his Harp Concerto. This annual award is given in recognition of outstanding contribution to any branch of learning and it was the first time that a musical composition was thus honoured. In 1997 Rajna received the Molteno Award for lifetime achievement from the Cape Tercentenary Foundation.

Rajna's Fantasy for Violin and Orchestra (1996), commissioned by the then Natal Philharmonic Orchestra, was premièred in Durban in 1998. Lyon and Healy Harps of Chicago commissioned his Suite for Violin and Harp for presentation at the Seventh World Harp Congress in Prague in July 1999. Anna Verkholantseva, winner of the 1997 Moscow international Harp Competition, who premiered this work in Prague, has since then made a CD of it and has given performances of the "Suite" with her violinist partner, Alexander Trostiansky, in Moscow, London, New York, Chicago and San Francisco. The opera Amarantha was premiered in November 2000 by Cape Town Opera in conjunction with the UCT Opera School.

In 2001 Rajna created his own CD label, Amarantha Records. His catalogue includes his performance of Goyescas by Granados, music by fellow Hungarian Dohnanyi, Messiaen's complete "Vingt regards", Bartok's 2nd and 3rd Piano Concertos, concertos by Schumann and Barber, Brahms' 2nd Piano Concerto, music by Scriabin and a selection of Rajna's representative compositions. The same year Rajna wrote Tarantulla for violin and piano in response to a commission for the 2002 Pretoria contest by the University of South Africa (Unisa) International String Competition. The Cape Town premiere of Video Games by the Cape Philharmonic Orchestra conducted by David de Villiers took place in August 2002 to public and critical acclaim. International violin virtuoso Mikhail Ovrutsky, who was the winner of the 2002 Pretoria string competition and who had performed Rajna's Tarantulla on that occasion, came to Cape Town to perform Rajna's Fantasy for Violin and Orchestra in May 2004. Rajna's Harp Concerto had its Swiss premiere in Basel in September 2004.

Rajna's recordings of the complete piano works of Spanish composer Enrique Granados (1867-1916), made in London for CRD in 1976, were reissued in 2004 on six CDs in a box set and distributed worldwide by Brilliant Classics. In 2007 these recordings were reissued by CDR on seven CDs which can be bought individually. Between 2002 and 2004 Rajna completed another opera, Valley Song, based on the play by Athol Fugard. The premiere took place at the Spier Summer Arts Festival, Stellenbosch, in March 2005 and in 2007 the opera was revived at the Klein Karoo National Arts Festival in Oudtshoorn, where it gained prizes in two categories: best musical show and most promising newcomer (Golda Schultz, soprano, the opera's leading lady).

In 2006 he completed The Creation-A Negro Sermon for chorus and orchestra, written for the First Cape Town International Summer Music Festival in 2006. Rajna's Piano Preludes are part of the syllabus for the Teachers' Licentiate of Unisa. In response to a commission by Unisa to write a set piece for the new Grade 7 Piano Examination Album he completed his Oriental Feast in August 2006. His Violin Concerto (2007) premiered in October 2010 at the University of Stellenbosch.

In the course of celebrating Rajna's 80th birthday the Cape Philharmonic Orchestra performed extracts from Valley Song in a concert during the Third Cape Town International Summer Music Festival in November 2008. Rajna himself was the soloist in his 2nd Piano Concerto. Rajna prepared and reissued on his label a series of his landmark recordings of earlier vintage, now digitally remastered and available on CD for the first time. He released Brahms's B flat major and Schumann's A minor piano concertos, Liszt's Transcendental Studies coupled with their earliest version, the 12 Etudes, Op. 1, and Messiaen's Vingt regards sur l'enfant-Jésus. In the pipeline are piano concertos by Bartók, Stravinsky, Prokofiev and Barber, Bach harpsichord concertos and music by Scriabin and Dohnanyi.

Rajna died at the age of 92 in a hospital in Cape Town on 16 July 2021.

== Compositions ==
=== Ballet ===
- Girl in a Mask, 1958 for the Western Theatre Ballet

=== Operas ===
- Amarantha, 2000
- Valley Song, based on the play by Athol Fugard, 2005

=== Filmography ===
- Seven Years in Tibet, 1956
- Jet Storm, 1959

=== Orchestral works ===
- Suite for Strings,1952–1954
- Movements for Strings, 1962
- Cantilenas and Interludes, 1968
- Divertimento Piccolo, 1987
- Video Games for orchestra, 1994

==== Concertante ====
- Piano Concerto No. 1, 1960–1962
- Piano Concerto No. 2, 1983–1984
- Concerto for Harp and Orchestra, 1990
- Rhapsody for Clarinet and Orchestra, 1995
- Fantasy for Violin and Orchestra, 1996
- Concerto for Violin and Orchestra, 2007

=== Chamber ===
==== Two players ====
- Music for clarinet and piano, 1947, Alphonse Leduc, Paris 1970
- Music for cello and piano, 1950
- Music for violin and piano, 1956–57, Accent Music, J'burg 1990
- Suite for violin and harp, 1997–98, Lyon & Healy, Chicago 1998
- Tarantulla for Violin and Piano, Amarantha Music 2001

==== Four players ====
- String Quartet, 1948

==== Ensemble ====
- Serenade for ten wind instruments, percussion, cimbalom (or marimba) and piano/celesta

== Piano ==
- Preludes for piano, 1947–1950, Accent Music, J'burg 1988 – Amarantha Music, Cape Town 2002
- Capriccio for piano (or harpsichord), 1960
- Oriental Feast 2006, Unisa/Amarantha Music, 200?

== Vocal ==
- Four Early Songs for high voice and piano
  - Cradle Song (William Blake), 1948
  - Piping Down the Valleys Wild (William Blake), 1948
  - Meeting at Night (Robert Browning), 1948
  - Solfeggio, 1949
- Four Traditional African Lyrics for high voice and piano, 1975
  - The Sorrow of Kodio
  - Idyll
  - Serenade
  - Cuckold contented
- "Stop All the Clocks" for middle voice and piano, Four songs on poems by W. H. Auden, 1998
  - Stop All the Clocks
  - The Composer
  - Their Lonely Betters
  - Refugee Blues

Poems used by kind permission of Curtis Brown Ltd., London, on behalf of the Estate of W. H. Auden, the copyright holders.

== Choral ==
- Three Hebrew Choruses, 1972–73
  - Adonai ma-adam
  - Hashkivenu
  - Laila mistereia
- The Creation- A Negro Sermon (JW Johnson), 2000, for unaccompanied mixed chorus, Amarantha Music
- The Creation – A Negro Sermon (JW Johnson), 2005–06 for chorus and orchestra, Amarantha Music
