= Seven Years in Tibet =

Book about Heinrich Harrer

- First UK edition
- Author: Heinrich Harrer
- Original title: Sieben Jahre in Tibet. Mein Leben am Hofe des Dalai Lama
- Genre: Travel literature
- Publisher: Rupert Hart-Davis (UK); E.P. Dutton (US)
- Publication date: 1952
- English publication date: 1953 (UK); 1954 (US)
- Media type: Print (Hardback & Paperback)

Seven Years in Tibet: My Life Before, During and After (1952; German: Sieben Jahre in Tibet. Mein Leben am Hofe des Dalai Lama (Seven years in Tibet. My life at the court of the Dalai Lama); 1954 in English) is an autobiographical travel book written by Austrian mountaineer and Nazi SS sergeant Heinrich Harrer based on his real life experiences in Tibet between 1944 and 1951 during the Second World War and the interim period before the Communist Chinese People's Liberation Army began the Battle of Chamdo in 1950 when the Chinese attempted to reestablish control over Tibet.

== Plot ==
The book covers the escape of Harrer and his companion, Peter Aufschnaiter, from a British prisoner-of-war camp in India. Harrer and Aufschnaiter then traveled across Tibet to Lhasa, the capital. Here they spent several years, and Harrer describes the contemporary Tibetan culture in detail. Harrer subsequently became a tutor and friend of the 14th Dalai Lama.

It has been said that the book "provided the world with a final glimpse of life in an independent Tibetan state prior to the Chinese invasion."

== Criticism ==
While Heinrich Harrer held the rank of a Nazi sergeant in the SS, he was a world renowned mountaineer and on expedition in the Indian Himalayas when he and his group were arrested by British colonial authorities after the outbreak of World War II. With his escape to Tibet (where he stayed until 1951) he never saw active combat.

After his Nazi affiliation was revealed by the German magazine Stern in 1997, he expressed regret for his involvement with the Party.

The book was criticized by Marxist political scientist Michael Parenti, who accused it of whitewashing Tibetan society before its annexation by the Chinese Communist Party. Parenti instead described it as a feudal society consisting of slavery, lifelong servitude, and serfdom before being liberated by the PLA.

== Publication ==
Seven Years in Tibet was translated into 53 languages, became a bestseller in the United States in 1954, and sold three million copies.

At the beginning of the Flamingo edition of the book, a message from the 14th Dalai Lama praises the work: "Harrer has always been such a friend to Tibet. His most important contribution to our cause, his book, Seven Years in Tibet, introduced hundreds of thousands of people to my country." When Harrer died in 2006, the Dalai Lama repeated his praise of the author and sent a message of sympathy to Harrer's widow.

== Pop culture ==
Two films have been based on the book: Seven Years in Tibet (1956), a 76-minute documentary directed by Hans Nieter which includes both movies shot by Harrer during his stay in Tibet and various scenes from his adventures reconstructed by Harrer himself, and Seven Years in Tibet (1997), directed by Jean-Jacques Annaud and starring Brad Pitt as Harrer and David Thewlis as Aufschnaiter.

There is also a David Bowie song entitled "Seven Years in Tibet", from his album Earthling (1997). Bowie read the book when he was 19 and it left a strong impression on him at the time.
