= Seven Years in Tibet (1997 film) =

1997 American film

- Theatrical release poster
- Directed by: Jean-Jacques Annaud
- Screenplay by: Becky Johnston
- Based on: Seven Years in Tibet by Heinrich Harrer
- Produced by: Jean-Jacques Annaud; Iain Smith; John H. Williams
- Starring: Brad Pitt; David Thewlis; BD Wong; Mako; Jamyang Jamtsho Wangchuk; Lhakpa Tsamchoe; Jetsun Pema
- Cinematography: Robert Fraisse
- Edited by: Noëlle Boisson
- Music by: John Williams
- Production companies: TriStar Pictures; Mandalay Entertainment
- Distributed by: Sony Pictures Releasing (Note: While Sony Pictures Releasing distributed this film in United States and most select territories, Summit Entertainment handled it overseas.)
- Release dates: September 13, 1997 (Toronto International Film Festival); October 10, 1997 (United States)
- Running time: 136 minutes
- Country: United States
- Languages: English; German; Nepali; Hindi; Mandarin; Tibetan
- Budget: $70 million
- Box office: $131.5 million

Seven Years in Tibet is a 1997 American biographical war drama film directed by Jean-Jacques Annaud. It is based on Austrian mountaineer and Schutzstaffel (SS) sergeant Heinrich Harrer's 1952 memoir of the same name, about his experiences in Tibet between 1944 and 1951. Seven Years in Tibet stars Brad Pitt and David Thewlis, and has music composed by John Williams with a feature performance by cellist Yo-Yo Ma.

In the film, Harrer (Pitt) and fellow Austrian Peter Aufschnaiter (Thewlis) are mountaineering in the 1930s India. When World War II begins in 1939, their German citizenship results in their imprisonment in a British prisoner-of-war camp in Dehradun in the Himalayas. In 1944, Harrer and Aufschnaiter escape the prison and cross the border into Tibet, traversing the treacherous high plateau. There, after initially being ordered to return to India, they are welcomed at the holy city of Lhasa and become absorbed into an unfamiliar way of life. Harrer is introduced to the 14th Dalai Lama, still a boy, and becomes one of his tutors. During their time together, Harrer becomes a close friend to the young spiritual leader. Harrer and Aufschnaiter stay in the country until the Battle of Chamdo in 1950.

== Plot ==
In 1939, Austrian mountaineer Heinrich Harrer leaves behind his pregnant wife to join Peter Aufschnaiter in a team attempting to summit Nanga Parbat in India (now part of Pakistan). When World War II begins in 1939, they are arrested by the British authorities for being enemy aliens, and are imprisoned in a prisoner-of-war camp in Dehradun in the Himalayan foothills, in the present-day Indian state of Uttarakhand. Harrer's wife, Ingrid, who has given birth to a son he has not seen, sends him divorce papers from Austria, by then annexed by Nazi Germany.

In 1944, Harrer and Aufschnaiter escape the prison and cross into Tibet. After being initially rejected by the isolated nation, they manage to travel in disguise to the Tibetan capital city of Lhasa. They become the house guests of Tibetan diplomat Kungo Tsarong. The Tibetan senior official Ngawang Jigme also extends friendship to the two foreigners with gifts of custom-made Western suits.

Aufschnaiter falls in love with the tailor, Pema Lhaki, and marries her. Harrer opts to remain single, both to focus on his new job of surveying the land and to avoid experiencing another failed relationship; much to the disappointment and dismay of his friends.

In 1945, Harrer plans to return to Austria upon hearing of the war's end; but his son Rolf sends him a cold letter in which he says that he is not his father. This stops him from leaving Tibet. Soon afterwards, Harrer is invited to the Potala Palace and becomes the 14th Dalai Lama's tutor in world geography, science, and Western culture. They end up becoming friends.

Meanwhile, political relations with the new Communist government of China sour as they make plans to take control of Tibet in replacement of the former central government, now defeated and retreated to Taiwan. Ngawang Jigme leads the Tibetan army at the border town of Chamdo to halt the advancing People's Liberation Army. However, he ends up surrendering and blows up the Tibetan ammunition dump after the one-sided Battle of Chamdo.

During the treaty signing, Kungo Tsarong tells Harrer that if Jigme had not destroyed the weapons supply, the Tibetan guerrillas could have held the mountain passes for months or even years; long enough to appeal to other nations for help. He also states that, for Tibetans, capitulation is like a death sentence.

As the Chinese occupy Tibet, Harrer condemns Jigme for betraying his country, declaring their friendship over. Out of disgust and contempt, he further humiliates the senior official by returning the jacket that Jigme gave him as a present, a grave insult in Tibetan culture; as well as by throwing him onto the ground before storming off.

Harrer tries to convince the Dalai Lama to flee, but he refuses; not wanting to abandon his people in spite of the danger. However, he encourages Harrer to return to Austria and be a father to his son. After the enthronement ceremony, in which the Dalai Lama is formally enthroned as the spiritual and temporal leader of Tibet, Harrer bids his friends farewell and returns to Austria in 1951.

Harrer's wife and her new husband almost do not recognize him for how different he is. Harrer's son, Rolf, bitterly refuses to meet him at first; but Harrer leaves a music box that the Dalai Lama gave him, and this piques the boy's interest. Years later, Harrer and Rolf (now a teenager) are seen mountain-climbing together, suggesting they have mended their relationship.

== Cast ==
- Brad Pitt as Heinrich Harrer
- David Thewlis as Peter Aufschnaiter
- BD Wong as Ngapoi Ngawang Jigme
- Mako as Tsarong
- Danny Denzongpa as Regent
- Victor Wong as Chinese 'Amban'
- Ingeborga Dapkūnaitė as Ingrid Harrer
- Jamyang Jamtsho Wangchuk as Dalai Lama Tenzin Gyatso, 14 years old
  - Sonam Wangchuk as Dalai Lama, 8 years old
  - Dorjee Tsering as Dalai Lama, 4 years old
- Lhakpa Tsamchoe as Pema Lhaki
- Jetsun Pema as The Great Mother
- Ama Ashe Dongtse as Tashi
- Ric Young as General Chang Jing Wu
- Ven Ngawang Chojor as Lord Chamberlain
- Duncan Fraser as British Officer

== Production ==
After the Chinese pressured the Indian government to threaten to cut electricity to the set and refuse to allow the film to set up a banking account, production shifted from Ladakh to Argentina. After the film was released, the director confirmed that two crews secretly shot about 20 minutes of footage for the movie in Tibet. Other footage was shot in Nepal, Austria and Canada.

Filming location in Mendoza, Argentina:

- Cerro Tunduqueral: a set was built to simulate the Tibet
- Parque Provincial Aconcagua y Penitentes: Used as it was the Himalayan landscape
- Minas de Paramillos: used natural scenery from the area.

== Music ==
Seven Years in Tibet

Film score by John Williams
- Released: September 30, 1997
- Genres: Soundtrack, Classical
- Length: 65:53
- Label: Sony

John Williams chronology
The Lost World: Jurassic Park (1997)	Seven Years in Tibet (1997)	Amistad (1997)

Track listing
No.	Title	Length
1.	"Seven Years in Tibet"	7:08
2.	"Young Dalai Lama and Ceremonial Chant"	2:14
3.	"Leaving Ingrid"	2:43
4.	"Peter's Rescue"	3:45
5.	"Harrer's Journey"	4:05
6.	"The Invasion"	5:08
7.	"Reflections"	4:41
8.	"Premonitions"	2:56
9.	"Approaching the Summit"	5:44
10.	"Palace Invitation"	4:46
11.	"Heinrich's Odyssey"	8:03
12.	"Quiet Moments"	4:21
13.	"Regaining a Son"	1:48
14.	"Seven Years in Tibet (Reprise)"	7:13

== Comparisons between the film and the book ==
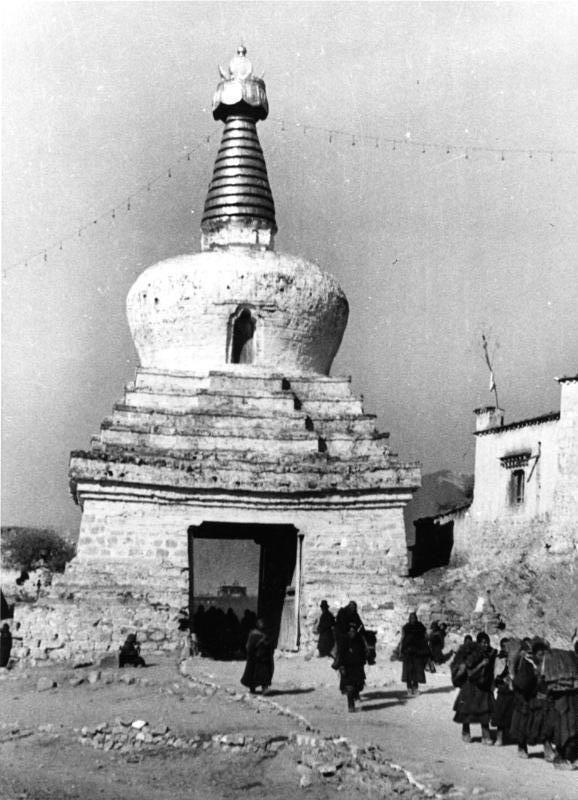
Monks passing under the Pargo Kaling chorten, or "Western Gate", in Lhasa near the Potala during Monlam Festival in 1938 Tibet. This structure was destroyed in 1967 and rebuilt in 1995. See the image in the original movie poster above.

The film has a number of significant differences from the book. At the beginning of the film, Harrer, who notably climbed the north face of the Eiger in 1938, is hailed as a "German hero", and replies: "Thank you, but I'm Austrian." To have said that in 1939 would have been extremely bold, since Austria had been part of Greater Germany since the Anschluss of April 1938. In the book, Harrer says nothing about any such remark. Additionally, during the scene at the train station, Harrer appears hostile to the Nazi Party, taking the Nazi flag with reluctance. The real-life Heinrich Harrer was in fact a Nazi SS Schutzstaffel NCO, and stated in his 1938 book that as a member of the German Alpine Association: "We climbed up the North Face of Eiger over the summit and up to our führer."

The film makes Harrer's son a key theme, but in the book, Harrer does not mention his wife or son. He had, in fact, been married and divorced, as the film shows, but his ex-wife's new husband was killed during the war and Harrer's son was raised by his ex-wife's mother. In his autobiography, Harrer gives details of his contact with his son, but nothing to support what the film shows. In the book, Harrer says there was little to tie him to his home as one of the reasons for staying in Tibet and not returning to Europe.

The pre-invasion visit of Chinese Communist negotiators to Lhasa, arriving at an airfield constructed by Tibetans, and their departure for China after a brief conference with their Tibetan counterparts—including the desecration of the sand mandala as well as the "religion is poison" remark, (Note: cf. Freedom in Exile, wherein the Dalai Lama recounts his 1954 visit to Beijing to meet Chairman Mao: "Finally, he [Mao] drew closer to me and said, 'Your attitude is good, you know. Religion is poison. Firstly it reduces the population, because monks and nuns must stay celibate, and secondly it neglects material progress.' At this I felt a violent burning sensation all over my face and I was suddenly very afraid.") as depicted in the film—do not occur in the book or other historical accounts.

There was no air link until Lhasa Gonggar Airport was constructed in 1956—when the Dalai Lama visited Beijing in 1954, he used the still-incomplete road system.

The whole sequence of negotiations and the installation of the Dalai Lama as ruler are out of sequence. Tenzin Gyatso, 14th Dalai Lama was enthroned as the temporal leader of Tibet on 17 November 1950. After the Chinese crossed the Jinsha River and defeated the Tibetan army in October 1950, a Tibetan delegation was sent to Beijing and agreed on the Seventeen Point Agreement for the Peaceful Liberation of Tibet. Meanwhile, the Dalai Lama left Lhasa and took refuge on the border with India and Sikkim. The Dalai Lama disliked the agreement. He returned to Lhasa, and for several years tried to work within its terms.

== Release ==
Seven Years in Tibet premiered on September 13, 1997, at the 1997 Toronto International Film Festival before a commercial release on October 8, 1997, in the United States and Canada where it opened in 3 theaters, grossing $46,130 in its first two days. The film was distributed to 2,100 more theaters for the weekend where it grossed $10,020,378. After its run, the film grossed $37,957,682 domestically and $93,500,000 overseas with an overall box office gross of $131,457,682.

=== Critical reception ===
Based on 36 reviews collected by Rotten Tomatoes, the film received a 58% approval rating, with an average score of 6.2/10. The site's consensus states: "Seven Years in Tibet tells its fascinating true-life story with a certain stolid grace, even if it never quite comes to life the way it could." Metacritic, which assigns a normalized rating in the 0–100 range based on reviews from top mainstream critics, calculated an average score of 55, based on 18 reviews, indicating "mixed or average reviews". Audiences polled by CinemaScore gave the film an average grade of "A-" on an A+ to F scale.

Roger Ebert of the Chicago Sun-Times gave the film 2 and a half stars out of 4, stating that "Seven Years in Tibet is an ambitious and beautiful movie with much to interest the patient viewer, but it makes the common mistake of many films about travelers and explorers: It is more concerned with their adventures than with what they discover." Ebert believed the film was told from the perspective of the wrong character and thought the casting of Pitt and Thewlis should have been reversed. Derek Elley of Variety praised the film's overall production value but thought: "for a story with all the potential of a sweeping emotional drama set in great locations, too often you just long for the pic to cut loose from the ethnography and correct attitudes and go with the drama in old Hollywood style."

=== Chinese reaction ===
As the film was being released, it was condemned by the government of the People's Republic of China, which stated that Communist Chinese military officers were intentionally shown as rude and arrogant, brutalizing the local people. The Chinese government also decried the film's positive portrayal of the 14th Dalai Lama. All future films produced by Sony were banned from playing in China, sending a message that the party would punish studios and their parent companies that made movies it did not like even if they were not ever planned for release in China. Annaud, Pitt, and Thewlis were initially banned from ever entering China. However, Annaud was since welcomed back to China in 2012 to chair the jury of the 15th annual Shanghai International Film Festival. In addition, Pitt subsequently visited China in 2014 and 2016. Sony was allowed to resume business in China in 1998.

=== Accolades ===
Ceremony	Category	Recipient	Result
55th Golden Globe Awards	Best Original Score	John Williams	Nominated
Japan Academy Prize	Outstanding Foreign Language Film	Seven Years in Tibet	Nominated
40th Grammy Awards	Best Score Soundtrack for Visual Media	John Williams	Nominated
Political Film Society	Peace	Seven Years in Tibet	Won
Political Film Society	Exposé	Seven Years in Tibet	Nominated
Political Film Society	Human Rights	Seven Years in Tibet	Nominated
Guild of German Art House Cinemas	Foreign Film	Jean-Jacques Annaud	Won
Stinkers Bad Movie Awards	Most Annoying Fake Accent	Brad Pitt (also for The Devil's Own)	Nominated
Rembrandt Award	Best Actor	Brad Pitt	Won
YoungStar Award	Best Young Actor in a Drama Film	Jamyang Jamtsho Wangchuk	Nominated

== See also ==
- Chinese censorship abroad
- Film censorship in China
- Kundun, another 1997 film depicting the Dalai Lama during his youth.
- List of TV and films critical of the Chinese Communist Party
- 1938–39 German expedition to Tibet, an actual state-sponsored expedition into Tibet by the Nazi Party to which Heinrich Harrer was an SS Oberscharführer.
