= Seven Years in Tibet (1956 film) =

1956 film

- Directed by: Hans Nieter
- Written by: Heinrich Harrer; Walter Ulbrich
- Produced by: Hans Nieter; Walter Ulbrich
- Narrated by: Heinrich Harrer
- Cinematography: Basil Gould; Heinrich Harrer; Peter Hennessy
- Edited by: Michael Orrom
- Music by: Thomas Rajna
- Production company: Seven League Productions
- Release date: 1956
- Running time: 79 minutes
- Country: United Kingdom
- Language: English

Seven Years in Tibet is a 1956 British documentary film directed by Hans Nieter, about the adventures of Heinrich Harrer. It is based on Harrer's 1952 book of the same name. It was entered into the 1956 Cannes Film Festival.

== Cast ==
- Heinrich Harrer as narrator
- Anton Diffring as the voices
- Rooney Pelletier as the voices
- Esmé Percy as the voices

== Reception ==
The Monthly Film Bulletin wrote: "Seven Years in Tibet recalls the adventures of Heinrich Harrer, an Austrian who escaped from an Indian prison-camp, crossed the Himalayas and then spent seven years in a land known to few foreigners. During this time he shot some very impressive 16 mm material of Lhasa, religious ceremonies and the flight of the Dalai Llama before the invading Chinese. The usual commercial mistrust of rough material, however great its interest, has led the producers to reconstruct parts of Harrer's adventures, by shooting studio episodes and location material, apparently in India. Needless to say, the resulting film is rather unsatisfactory. Out of seventy-five minutes, only twenty minutes are Harrer's authentic material; and even this has been rendered suspect by the interpolation of shots of totally different technical quality. On the whole, through lack of trust in their material, which was rare enough to stand on its own interest, the producers have turned a marvellous short into an overlong, tedious and unremarkable feature-length documentary."

Kine Weekly wrote: "Exciting travel feature ... The production combines scenes shot by Harrer himself with professionally-made sequences. And even if the blending is not always harmonious, the subject matter is so original and exciting that this can be overlooked. ... Some of Harrer's own shots are, of necessity, amateurish but this factor serves to stress the genuineness of the narrative. The manner in which the commentary is never allowed to overplay the incidents photographed, adds to the interest. An outstanding travel feature of wide general interest."

The Daily Film Renter wrote: "This is more than just another travelogue, because it has been given a strong story line to hold the documentary material together. Some fantastic scenes actually shot by Harrer in Lhasa include temple dances, crowd scenes, and the Dalai Lama himself – smiling genially at the concealed photographer right in the midst of a big religious ceremony! There are also scenes of the arrival of the Chinese and of the Dalai Lama's departure. There's a little explorer hidden away even in the most timid of us, and this unusual film provides enthralling entertainment of its kind with a special appeal to family audiences."
