= Tibetan Children's Villages =

Non-Profit Organization

Tibetan Children's Villages (TCV) བོད་ཕྲུག་ཁྱིམ་སྡེ་
- Founded: 1960
- Type: Non-profit
- Location: Dharamsala
- Website: tcv.org.in

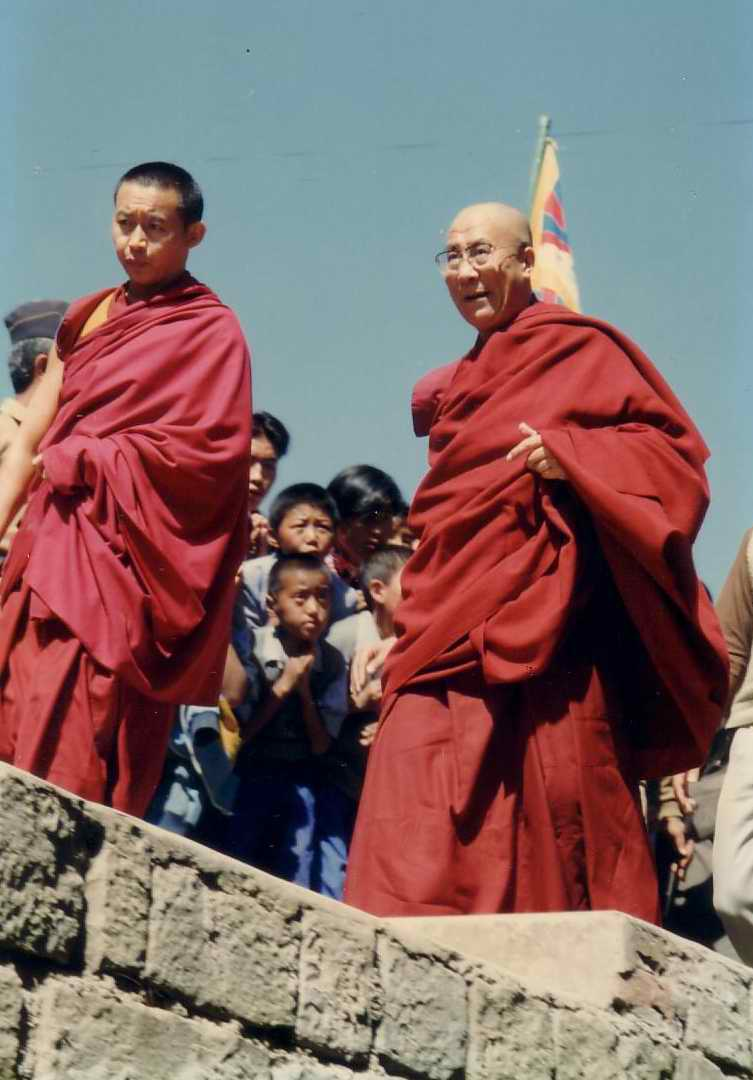
Dalai Lama at Tibetan Children's Village, Dharamsala, 1993.

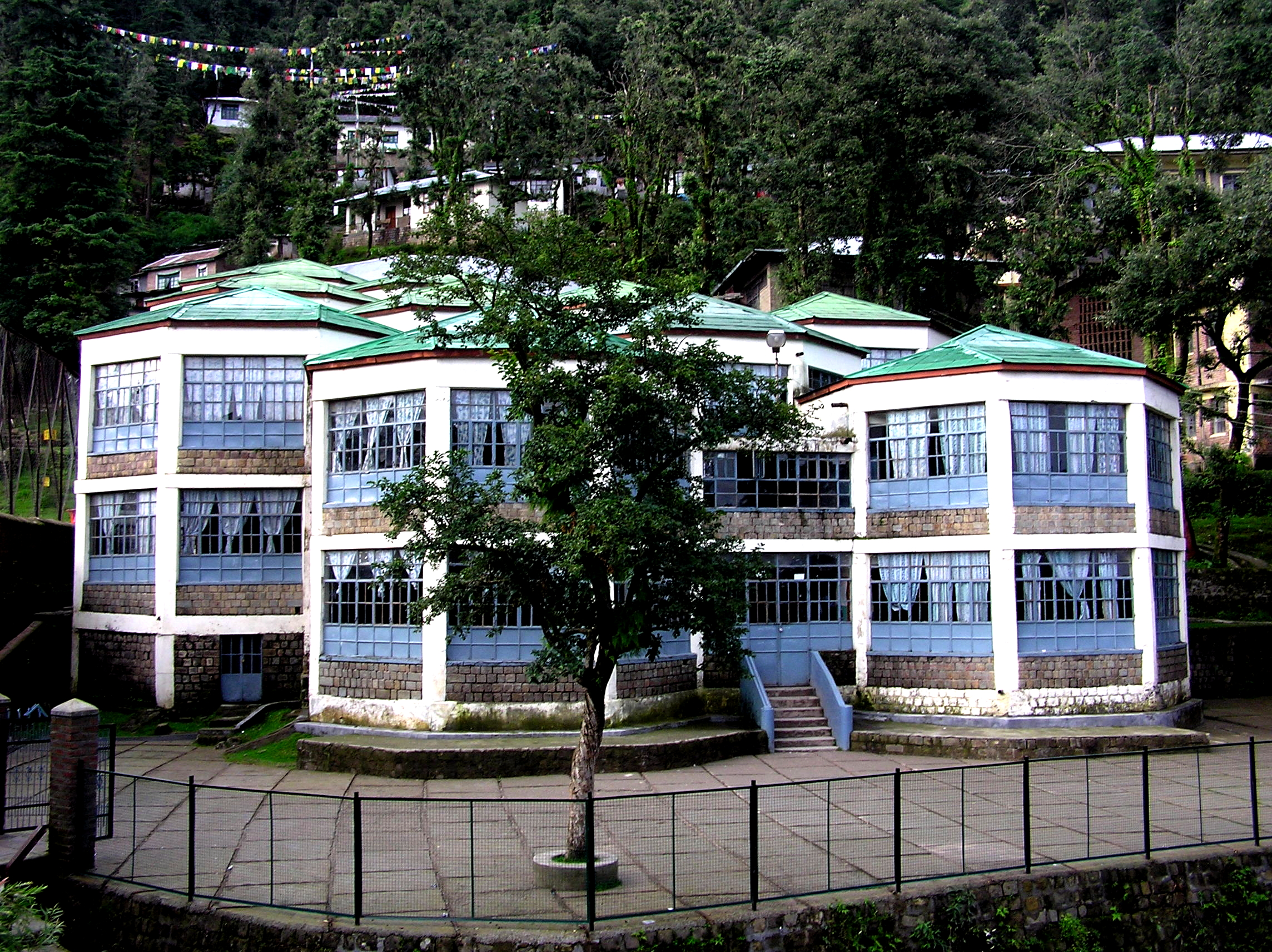
View of Tibetan Children's Villages, at McLeod Ganj, Dharamsala.

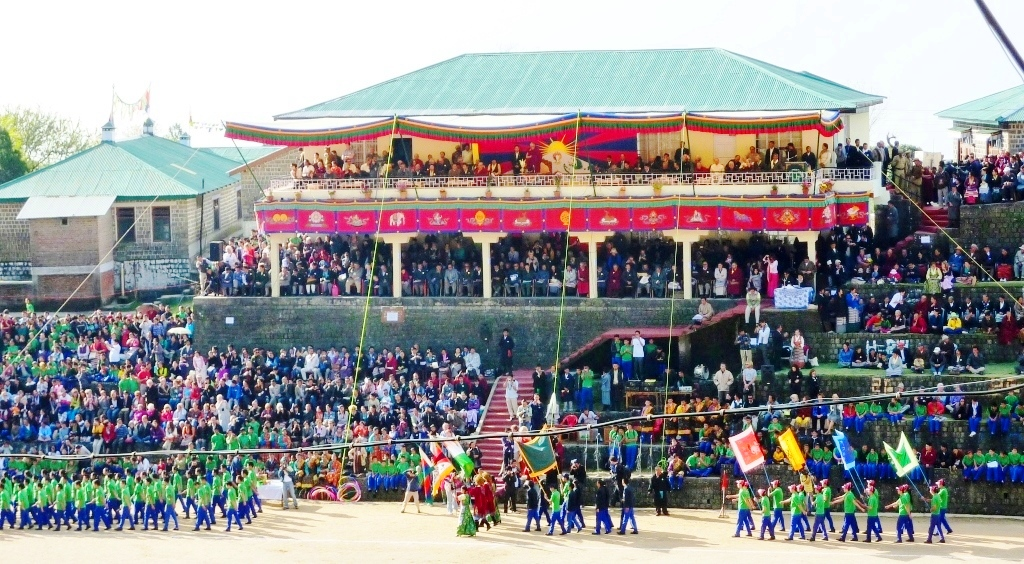
Tibetan Children's Villages' 50th anniversary in Dharamsala, 2010.

Tibetan Children's Villages or TCV is an integrated community in exile for the care and education of orphans, destitutes and refugee children from Tibet. It is a registered, nonprofit charitable organization with its main facility based at Dharamsala in Himachal Pradesh, North India. TCV has a network spread across India with over 12,000 children under its care.

From 1964 until 2006 the TCV has been presided by Jetsun Pema, sister of 14th Dalai Lama Tenzin Gyatso. In 2009, The TCV established the first Tibetan college in exile in Bangalore (India) which was named "The Dalai Lama Institute for Higher Education". The goals of this college is to teach Tibetan language and Tibetan culture, but also science, arts, counseling and information technology to Tibetan students in exile.

The Tibetan Children's Village continually contributes today. Over 60% of co-workers in different TCV branches are alumni members, and a significant number of graduate students are serving in various departments of the exiled government. Also, it has expanded and currently operates centers in Upper Dharamshala, Lower Dharamshala, Bylakuppe, Gopalpur, Chauntra, Suja, Ladakh, and Selakui. The Village also operates Youth Hostels in Delhi and Bengaluru. The Mission of Tibetan Children's Villages (TCV) - is to certify that all Tibetan children under its care receive a sound education, strong cultural identity, and become self-reliant and contributing members of the Tibetan community and the world at large.

== Locations ==
- Lower Dharamsala
- TCV Selakui
- McLeod Ganj
- Upper Dharamsala
- TCV Bylakuppee
- TCV Chauntra
- TCV Gopalpur
- TCV Ladakh
- Suja

== See also ==
- List of organizations of Tibetans in exile
