= David Thewlis =

English actor (born 1963)

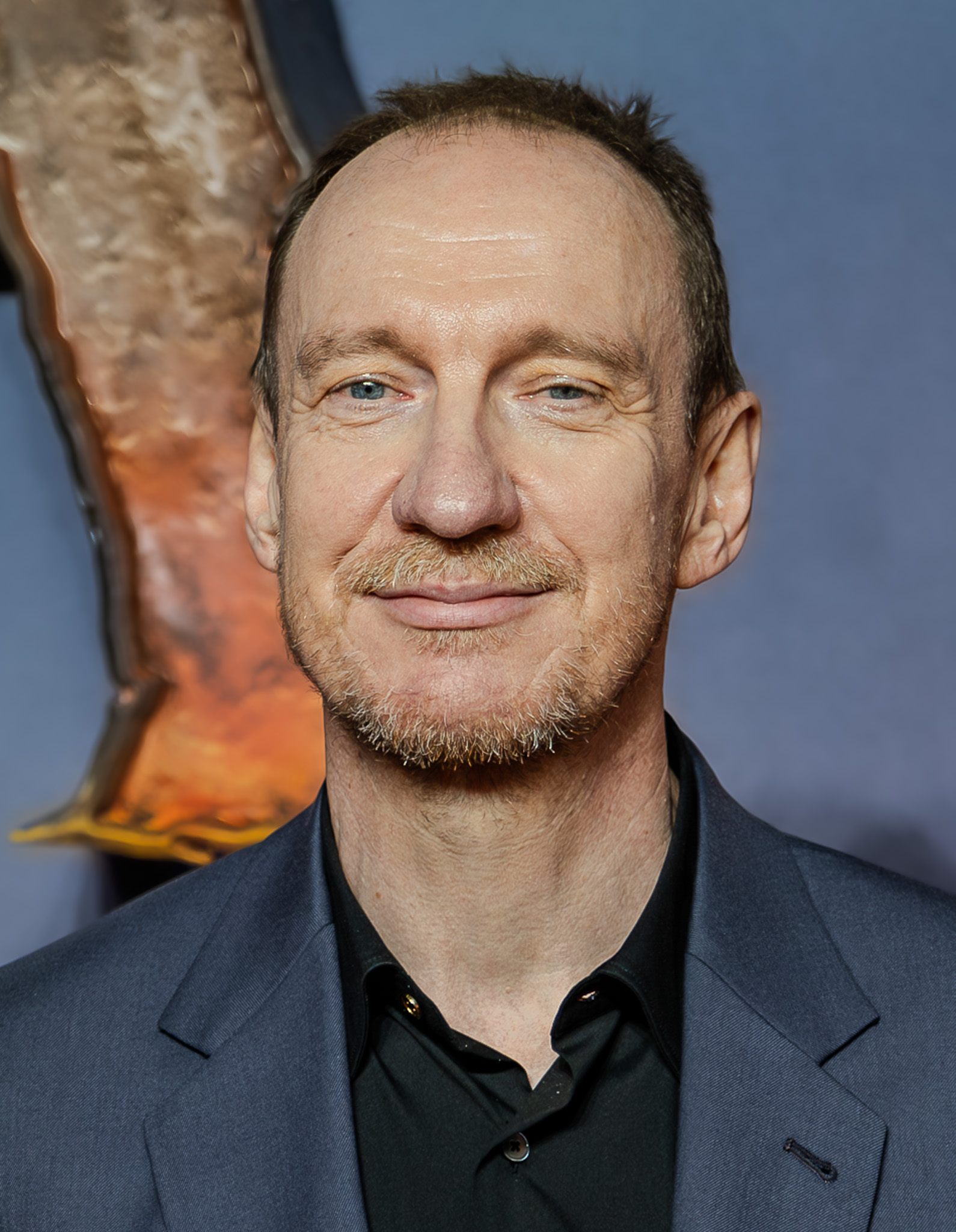
- Thewlis in 2025
- Born: David Wheeler; 20 March 1963 (age 63); Blackpool, Lancashire, England
- Occupations: Actor; filmmaker
- Years active: 1985–present
- Spouses: Sara Sugarman (m. 1992; div. 1994); Hermine Poitou (m. 2016)
- Partner(s): Anna Friel (2001–2010)
- Children: 1

David Wheeler (born 20 March 1963), known professionally as David Thewlis (/ˈθjuːlɪs/), is an English actor and filmmaker. He has won one Cannes Film Festival Award for Best Actor and received nominations for two BAFTA Awards, one Golden Globe Award, one Primetime Emmy Award, and one Screen Actors Guild Award.

Thewlis made his film debut in Little Dorrit (1987) and had his breakthrough with roles in the Mike Leigh films Life Is Sweet (1990) and Naked (1993), winning the Cannes Film Festival Award for Best Actor for the latter. He appeared in films such as Black Beauty (1994), Restoration (1995), James and the Giant Peach (1996), Dragonheart (1996), Seven Years in Tibet (1997), The Big Lebowski (1998), Gangster No. 1 (2000), and as Remus Lupin in the Harry Potter franchise (2004–2011). Other film roles include Kingdom of Heaven (2005), The Boy in the Striped Pyjamas (2008), War Horse (2011), The Theory of Everything (2014), Anomalisa (2015), Wonder Woman (2017), I'm Thinking of Ending Things (2020), and Enola Holmes 2 (2022).

Thewlis's most notable television roles include V. M. Varga in the third season of FX's Fargo (2017), the voice of the Shame Wizard in the Netflix animated sitcoms Big Mouth (2017–2025) and Human Resources (2022–2023), Christopher Edwards in the HBO miniseries Landscapers (2021), John Dee in the Netflix drama series The Sandman (2022), and Fagin in the Disney+ TV series The Artful Dodger (2023). His performance in Fargo earned him nominations for an Emmy, a Golden Globe, and a Critics' Choice Award.

== Early life ==
Thewlis was born David Wheeler in Blackpool on 20 March 1963, the middle child of Maureen (née Thewlis) and Alec Raymond Wheeler. His parents ran a toy and wallpaper shop. As a teenager, he played in a rock band called QED and played lead guitar with a punk rock band called Door 66. He was educated at Highfield High School in Blackpool's Marton area. He later joined London's Guildhall School of Music and Drama, graduating in 1984.

== Career ==
=== Acting ===
Wheeler decided to use his mother's maiden name, Thewlis, for his stage name after attempting to register with the actors' union and discovering that his birth name, David Wheeler, was already used by someone else. His first professional role after doing so was in the play Buddy Holly at the Regal in Greenwich and in a commercial for Kellogg's Bran Flakes. In theatre, Thewlis has starred in Sam Mendes' The Sea at the Royal National Theatre, Max Stafford-Clark's Ice Cream at the Royal Court Theatre, The Ruffian on the Stairs/The Woolley at Farnham, and The Lady and the Clarinet at the King's Head Theatre.

He went on to play small roles in high-profile series such as BBC's Only Fools and Horses (1985), and The Singing Detective (1986), before being offered a more significant part in Alan Clarke's Road, and in the ITV sitcom Valentine Park (1987). That same year, Thewlis made his film debut in Little Dorrit.

His first big-screen leading role was opposite Clive Owen in Vroom, directed by Beeban Kidron in 1988, and he starred in Paul Greengrass's anti-Falkland War drama Resurrected (1989), playing a presumed-dead soldier who returns to Britain. He collaborated with Mike Leigh on Life Is Sweet (1990), in which he played Jane Horrocks' character's lover. He continued playing low-key supporting roles in films such as Damage (1992), directed by Louis Malle, and the David Hugh Jones directed film The Trial (1993).

Thewlis's breakout role was in the film Naked (1993), directed by Mike Leigh, as the main character Johnny, a homeless, highly intelligent, embittered, rambling street philosopher, for which Thewlis was named Best Actor by the National Society of Film Critics, the London Film Critics Circle, the Evening Standard, the New York Film Critics' Circle and the Cannes Film Festival. That same year, he appeared on television as a sexual predator named James Jackson opposite Helen Mirren and Ciarán Hinds in Prime Suspect 3.

During the 1990s, Thewlis appeared in a variety of films, mostly fantasy and period pieces, including Restoration (1995), Black Beauty (1994), Total Eclipse (1995) with Leonardo DiCaprio, The Island of Dr. Moreau (1996), Dragonheart (1996), and Seven Years in Tibet (1997), opposite Brad Pitt. He was nominated for a British Independent Film Award, for Divorcing Jack (1998), and played Clov in a television film of Samuel Beckett's Endgame (2000). Notable appearances included Bernardo Bertolucci's Besieged (1998), the Coen brothers' The Big Lebowski (1998), and opposite Paul Bettany and Malcolm McDowell in Paul McGuigan's Gangster No. 1 (2000).

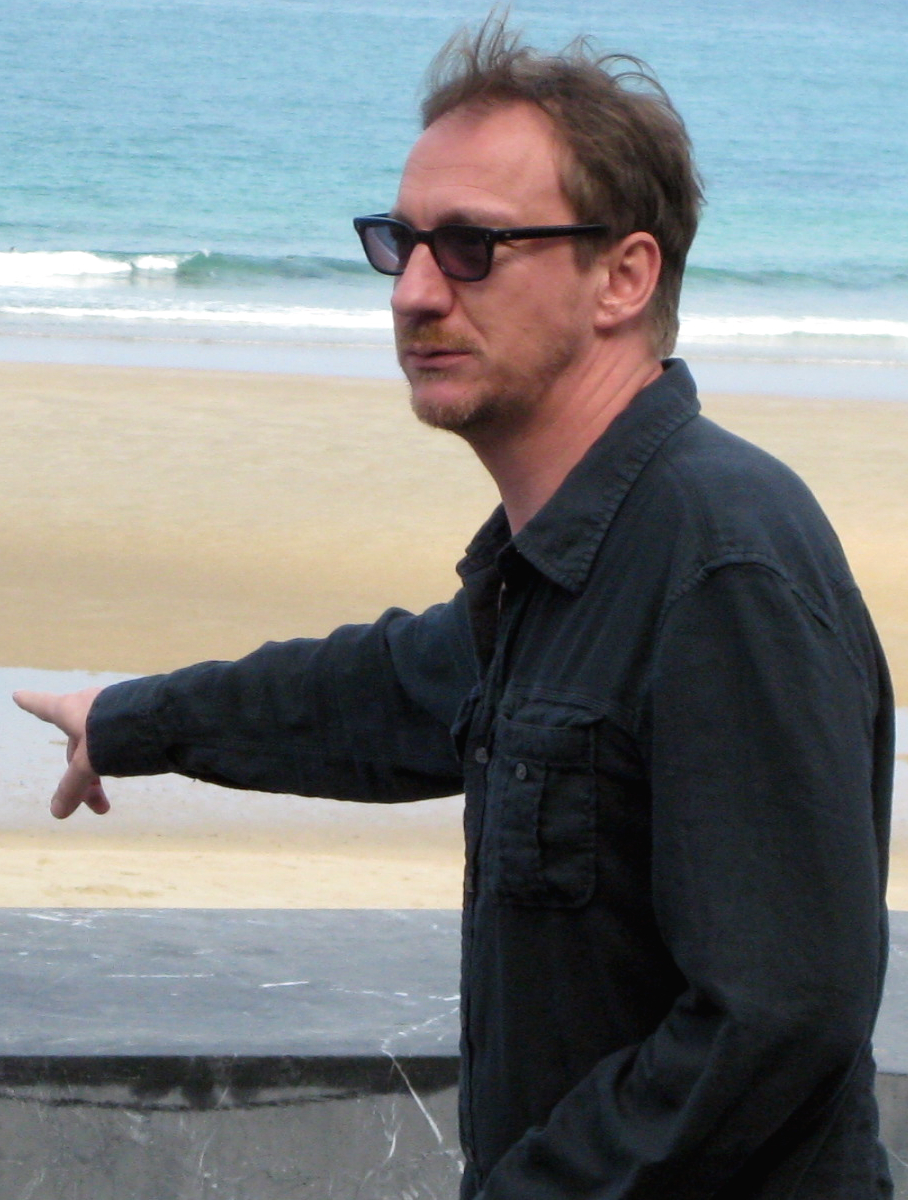
Thewlis in 2008

Thewlis auditioned for the role of Quirinus Quirrell in the Chris Columbus directed film Harry Potter and the Philosopher's Stone, but the part went to Ian Hart. Despite missing out on the first film, he was cast in 2004 as Professor Remus Lupin in Harry Potter and the Prisoner of Azkaban. He did not have to audition as he was director Alfonso Cuarón's first choice for the role. Thewlis reprised the role in four other films in the series.

Thewlis appeared as an SS Commandant of a Nazi death camp and father of the main character in The Boy in the Striped Pyjamas, which was well received. His other credits include Ridley Scott's Kingdom of Heaven (2005), Terrence Malick's The New World (2005), and The Omen (2006).

Thewlis played Dr Michael Aris, husband of Aung San Suu Kyi, with Malaysian actress Michelle Yeoh as Suu Kyi, in the biopic The Lady (2011), directed by Luc Besson. In 2012, he received an International Festival of Independent Cinema Off Plus Camera Award. In the same year, he played in Separate We Come, Separate We Go, directed by Bonnie Wright.

In June 2015, Thewlis was reported to be filming scenes for a Donald Crowhurst biopic, The Mercy, on the beach at Teignmouth, Devon, playing Donald Crowhurst's press agent, Rodney Hallworth, while Colin Firth would play Donald Crowhurst. He starred in Regression, a thriller released in autumn 2015. In September 2015, Thewlis starred as Inspector Goole in Helen Edmundson's BBC TV adaptation of J. B. Priestley's An Inspector Calls. In October 2015, he played King Duncan in the film Macbeth (2015).

Thewlis portrayed Ares in Wonder Woman (2017), the DC Comics film featuring the character Wonder Woman. He briefly reprised his role as Ares in Justice League (2017). That same year, he appeared as V. M. Varga, the main antagonist of the third season of Fargo. His performance was critically acclaimed, and earned him nominations for the Primetime Emmy Award, Critics' Choice Television Award and Golden Globe Award as a supporting actor.

He has voiced the Shame Wizard in the Netflix animated sitcom Big Mouth (2017–2025), and its spin-off Human Resources (2022–2023).

Thewlis starred in the Netflix film I'm Thinking of Ending Things (2020), the HBO miniseries Landscapers (2021), the Netflix drama series The Sandman (2022), the Netflix film Enola Holmes 2 (2022), and the animated film The Amazing Maurice (2022). In 2023, he played Fagin in The Artful Dodger, and in 2024, Hades in Kaos.

=== Filmmaking ===
Thewlis directed Hello, Hello, Hello in 1995, for which he was nominated for a BAFTA Award for Best Short Film at the 49th British Academy Film Awards. He also wrote, directed and starred in the feature Cheeky (2003).

=== Writing ===
Thewlis's black comedy novel set in the art world, The Late Hector Kipling, was published by Simon & Schuster in 2007. His second book, Shooting Martha, was published by Weidenfeld & Nicolson in 2021.

== Personal life ==
Thewlis married Welsh director and actress Sara Sugarman in 1992 and they divorced in 1994. He later dated English actress Kate Hardie for three years. He began a relationship with English actress Anna Friel in 2000, and they had a daughter in 2005 before they split up in 2010. Thewlis married French designer and artist Hermine Poitou on 6 August 2016. They live in Sunningdale.

== Filmography ==
Key
†	Denotes films that have not yet been released

=== Film ===
Year	Title	Role	Notes
1987	The Short and Curlies	Clive	Short film
1987	Little Dorrit	George Braddle	
1988	Vroom	Ringe	
1989	Skuldugery	Tony	Television film
1989	Resurrected	Kevin Deakin	
1991	Life Is Sweet	Nicola's Lover	
1991	Afraid of the Dark	Locksmith / Tom Miller	
1992	Swords at Teatime	Michael	Short
1992	Damage	Detective	
1993	The Trial	Franz	
1993	Naked	Johnny	
1994	Black Beauty	Jerry Barker	
1995	Total Eclipse	Paul Verlaine	
1995	Restoration	Pearce	
1995	Hello, Hello, Hello	—N/a	Short film; Writer and director
1996	James and the Giant Peach	Mr. Earthworm	Voice role
1996	Dragonheart	Einon	
1996	The Island of Dr. Moreau	Edward Douglas	
1997	American Perfekt	Santini	
1997	Seven Years in Tibet	Peter Aufschnaiter	
1998	The Big Lebowski	Knox Harrington	
1998	Divorcing Jack	Dan Starkey	
1998	Besieged	Jason Kinsky	
1999	Whatever Happened to Harold Smith?	Nesbit	
1999	Love Story	Dealer	Voice role, short
2000	The Miracle Maker	Judas Iscariot	Voice role
2000	Gangster No. 1	Freddie Mays	
2001	Goodbye Charlie Bright	Dad	
2001	Endgame	Clov	Television film
2001	Hamilton Mattress	Hamilton Mattress	Voice role, television film
2002	D.I.Y. Hard	Man	Short
2003	Cheeky	Harry Sankey	Writer, director
2003	Little Wolf's Book of Badness	Mr. Twister	Voice role, short
2003	Timeline	Robert Doniger	
2004	Harry Potter and the Prisoner of Azkaban	Remus Lupin	
2005	Kingdom of Heaven	Hospitaler	
2005	All the Invisible Children	Jonathan	Segment: "Jonathan"
2005	The New World	Wingfield	
2006	Basic Instinct 2	Roy Washburn	
2006	The Omen	Keith Jennings	
2007	The Inner Life of Martin Frost	Martin Frost	
2007	Harry Potter and the Order of the Phoenix	Remus Lupin	
2008	The Boy in the Striped Pyjamas	Father	
2009	Harry Potter and the Half-Blood Prince	Remus Lupin	
2009	Veronika Decides to Die	Dr. Blake	
2010	Mr. Nice	Jim McCann	
2010	London Boulevard	Jordan	
2010	Athena	Chuck	Short
2010	Harry Potter and the Deathly Hallows – Part 1	Remus Lupin	
2011	Harry Potter and the Deathly Hallows – Part 2	Remus Lupin	
2011	The Lady	Michael Aris	
2011	Anonymous	William Cecil	
2011	War Horse	Lyons	
2011	The Organ Grinder's Monkey	Pablo	Short
2012	Separate We Come, Separate We Go	Norman	Short film
2013	RED 2	The Frog	
2013	The Fifth Estate	Nick Davies	
2013	The Zero Theorem	Joby	
2014	The Theory of Everything	Dennis Sciama	
2014	Stonehearst Asylum	Mickey Finn	
2014	Queen and Country	Sargeant Major Bradley	
2014	Sunday Roast	Dick Puck	Short film; Writer
2015	Regression	Kenneth Raines	
2015	Legend	Leslie Payne	
2015	Macbeth	Duncan	
2015	Anomalisa	Michael Stone	Voice role
2015	An Inspector Calls	The Inspector	Television film
2017	Wonder Woman	Sir Patrick	
2017	Justice League	Ares	Cameo
2018	The Mercy	Rodney Hallworth	
2019	Rare Beasts	Vic	
2019	Guest of Honour	Jim	
2019	Eternal Beauty	Mike	
2020	I'm Thinking of Ending Things	Father	
2022	Enola Holmes 2	Grail	
2022	The Amazing Maurice	Boss Man	Voice role
2025	The Thing with Feathers	Crow	Voice role
2025	Avatar: Fire and Ash	Peylak	
2026	Signal One	Perry Glassner	

=== Television ===
Year	Title	Role	Notes
1985	Up the Elephant and Round the Castle	The Mugger	Episode: "A Taxing Problem" (non-speaking)
1985	Summer Season	Jim Dench	Episode: "Radio Pictures"
1985	Only Fools and Horses	Stew	Episode: "It's Only Rock and Roll"
1986	The Singing Detective	Second Soldier	Miniseries
1987–1988	Valentine Park	Max	12 episodes
1987–1991	ScreenPlay	Joey / Terry	2 episodes
1989	A Bit of a Do	Paul Simcock	6 episodes
1990	Oranges Are Not the Only Fruit	Doctor	Miniseries
1991	Shrinks	Terry Slater	Episode #1.5
1991–1992	Screen One	Crematorium Attendant / Tim Shanks	2 episodes
1993	Frank Stubbs Promotes	Mike Bence	Episode: "Striker"
1993	Prime Suspect 3	James Jackson	Episode: "Keeper of Souls: Parts 1 and 2"
1994	Dandelion Dead	Oswald Martin	Miniseries
2002	Dinotopia	Cyrus Crabb	Miniseries
2007	The Street	Harry Jennerson / Joe Jennerson	Episode: "Twins"
2014	Family Guy	British Father	Voice role, Episode: "Chap Stewie"
2017	Fargo	V. M. Varga / Robot	10 episodes
2018–2025	Big Mouth	Shame Wizard	Voice role, 19 episodes
2019	The Feed	Lawrence Hatfield	6 episodes
2020	Barkskins	Monsieur Claude Trepagny	8 episodes
2021	Landscapers	Christopher Edwards	Miniseries
2022–2023	Human Resources	Lionel St. Swithens / Shame Wizard	Voice role, 20 episodes
2022	The Sandman	John Burgess	Co-starring; 4 episodes
2023–present	The Artful Dodger	Fagin	Main role
2024	Kaos	Hades	Regular role
2025	Sherlock & Daughter	Sherlock Holmes	Lead role
2025	Dirty Business	Ash	Lead role

=== Video games ===
Year	Title	Role
2010	World of Warcraft: Cataclysm	Lord Darius Crowley

=== Music videos ===
Year	Title	Artist	Role
2022	"100% Endurance"	Yard Act	Performer

== Awards and nominations ==
Year	Award	Category	Work	Result	Ref.
1993	Cannes Film Festival	Best Actor	Naked	Won	
1993	Evening Standard British Film Award	Best Actor	Naked	Won	
1993	London Film Critics' Circle	British Actor of the Year	Naked	Won	
1993	National Society of Film Critics	Best Actor	Naked	Won	
1993	New York Film Critics Circle	Best Actor	Naked	Won	
1995	BAFTA Award	Best Short Film (shared with Helen Booth and James Roberts)	Hello, Hello, Hello	Nominated	
1998	British Independent Film Award	Best Performance by a British Actor in an Independent Film	Divorcing Jack	Nominated	
2006	Golden Raspberry Award	Worst Supporting Actor	Basic Instinct 2 / The Omen	Nominated	
2007	Monte-Carlo Television Festival	Golden Nymph Award for Outstanding Actor – Drama Series	The Street	Nominated	
2008	British Independent Film Award	Richard Harris Award for Outstanding Contribution to British Film		Won	
2009	Scream Award	Best Ensemble (shared with the entire cast)	Harry Potter and the Half-Blood Prince	Won	
2010	Evening Standard British Film Award	Peter Sellers Award for Comedy	London Boulevard	Nominated	
2011	Scream Award	Best Ensemble (shared with the entire cast)	Harry Potter and the Deathly Hallows – Part 2	Nominated	
2012	Gold Derby Film Awards	Best Ensemble Cast (shared with the entire cast)	Harry Potter and the Deathly Hallows – Part 2	Nominated	
2014	Screen Actors Guild Awards	Outstanding Performance by a Cast in a Motion Picture	The Theory of Everything	Nominated	
2015	CinEuphoria Awards	Best Supporting Actor - International Competition	Queen and Country	Nominated	
2016	Alliance of Women Film Journalists	Best Depiction of Nudity, Sexuality, or Seduction (shared with Jennifer Jason Leigh)	Anomalisa	Won	
2017	Primetime Emmy Award	Outstanding Supporting Actor in a Limited Series or Movie	Fargo	Nominated	
2017	Critics' Choice Television Award	Best Supporting Actor in a Movie/Miniseries	Fargo	Nominated	
2017	Golden Globe Award	Best Supporting Actor – Series, Miniseries or Television Film	Fargo	Nominated	
2017	Gold Derby Television Awards	Best TV Movie/Miniseries Supporting Actor	Fargo	Nominated	
2019	Gold Derby TV Decade Award	Best TV Movie/Miniseries Supporting Actor	Fargo	Nominated	
2019	Vancouver Film Critics Circle	Best Actor in a Canadian Film	Guest of Honour	Nominated	
2020	Indiana Film Journalists Association	Best Supporting Actor	I'm Thinking of Ending Things	Nominated	
2021	Chlotrudis Award	Best Supporting Actor	I'm Thinking of Ending Things	Nominated	
2022	BAFTA Award	Best Actor	Landscapers	Nominated	
